= Nabu-balatsu-iqbi =

Nabu-balatsu-iqbi (Neo-Babylonian Akkadian: 𒀭𒀝𒁀𒆷𒀜𒋢𒅅𒁉, romanized: Nabû-balāṭsu-iqbi) was the father of the Neo-Babylonian king Nabonidus (r. 556–539 BC). A mysterious figure, Nabu-balatsu-iqbi is only referenced in Nabonidus's own inscriptions, with no other record of his existence or status.

== Speculation ==
In his inscriptions, Nabonidus refers to his father Nabu-balatsu-iqbi as a "learned counsellor", "wise prince", "perfect prince" and "heroic governor". Nabonidus never elaborates more on his father's origin and ethnicity, just maintaining that he was courageous, wise and devout. No person named Nabu-balatsu-iqbi who can reasonably be identified as Nabonidus's father appears in documents prior to Nabonidus's reign, making his father's status and position unclear. Nabonidus's mother, Addagoppe, was associated with the city of Harran in the northern parts of the empire (formerly an Assyrian stronghold). Since Addagoppe likely married Nabu-balatsu-iqbi early in her life, per Mesopotamian custom, Nabu-balatsu-iqbi was also probably a prominent resident of that city, possibly of Assyrian or Aramean origin.

That Nabu-balatsu-iqbi is repeatedly referred to as "prince" in Nabonidus's inscriptions suggests some sort of noble status and political importance. Frauke Weiershäuser and Jamie Novotny speculated that Nabu-balatsu-iqbi could have been an Aramean chief. Stephen Herbert Langdon theorised that Nabu-balatsu-iqbi was a son of the Assyrian king Esarhaddon (r. 681–669 BC), but there is no concrete evidence for this relation.
