= Nabonidus =

Last king of the Neo-Babylonian Empire (r. 556–539 BC)

- King of Babylon; King of Sumer and Akkad; King of the Four Corners; King of the Universe
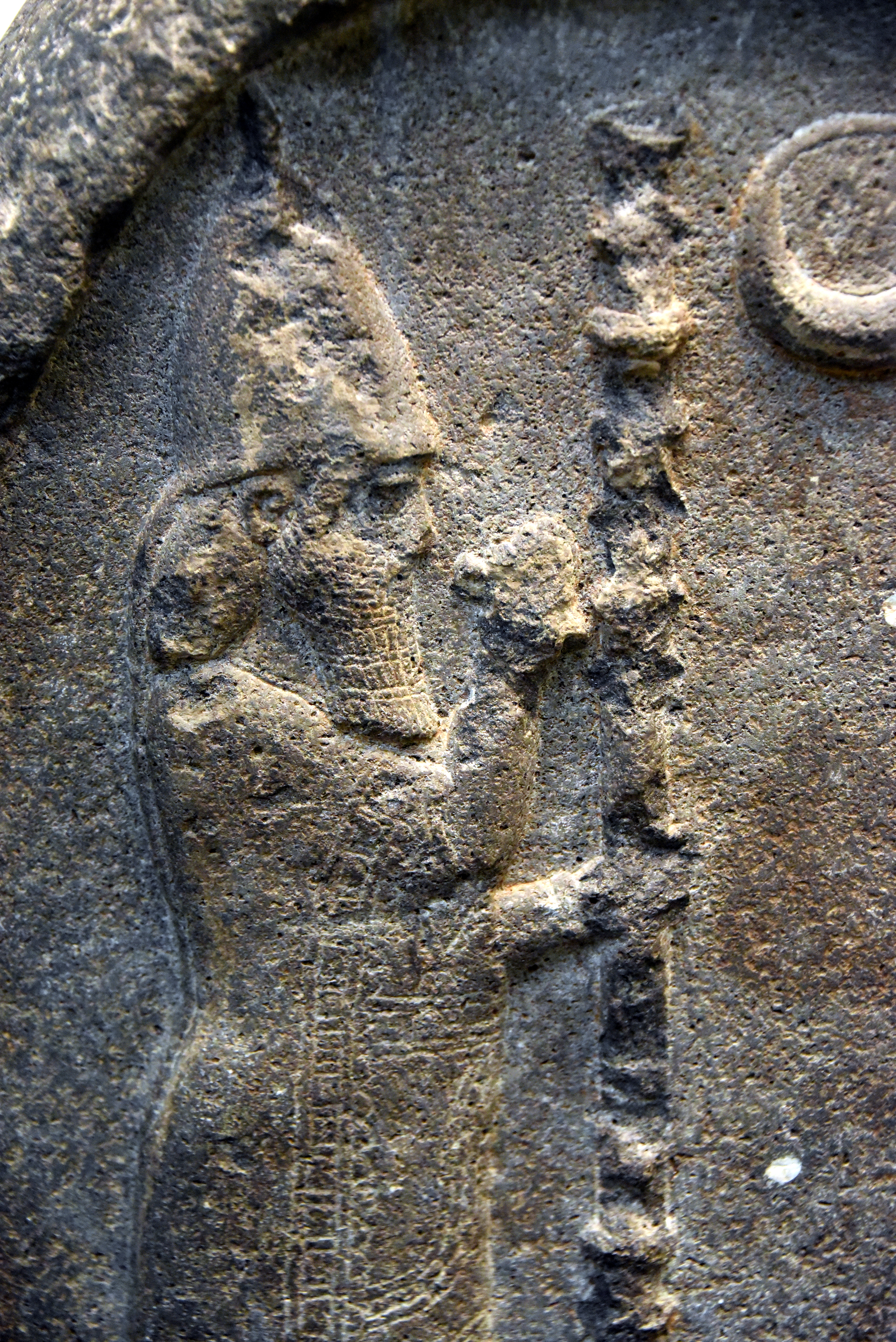
- Nabonidus, detail of a stele in the British Museum, probably from Babylon, Iraq

King of the Neo-Babylonian Empire
- Reign: 25 May 556 BC – 13 October 539 BC
- Predecessor: Labashi-Marduk
- Successor: Cyrus the Great (Achaemenid Empire)
- Born: c. 620–615 BC; Harran
- Died: Possibly after 522 BC; Carmania (?)
- Spouse: Nitocris (?) (A daughter of Nebuchadnezzar II) (?)
- Issue Among others: Belshazzar; Ennigaldi-Nanna; Ina-Esagila-remat; Akkabuʾunma
- Akkadian: Nabû-naʾid
- Dynasty: Chaldean dynasty (through marriage) (?)
- Father: Nabu-balatsu-iqbi
- Mother: Adad-guppi

Nabonidus (Neo-Babylonian Akkadian: 𒀭𒀝𒈾𒀪𒀉, romanized: Nabû-naʾid, meaning "May Nabu be exalted" or "Nabu is praised") was the last king of the Neo-Babylonian Empire, ruling from 556 BC to the fall of Babylon to the Achaemenid Empire under Cyrus the Great in 539 BC. Nabonidus was the last native ruler of ancient Mesopotamia, the end of his reign marking the end of thousands of years of Sumero-Akkadian states, kingdoms and empires. He was also the last independent king of Babylon. (Note: Nabonidus was the last independent native king of Babylon. Foreign rulers, including the Achaemenids, used the title long after 539 BC and Babylonian king lists continue to recognise foreign rulers up until the Parthian period, centuries after the fall of the Neo-Babylonian Empire. Additionally, the Babylonians rebelled several times against their foreign rulers, crowning native kings whose control of the city and parts of the rest of Babylonia in all cases lasted only a few months. The last such native rebel king was either Shamash-eriba (484 BC) or Nidin-Bel (336/335 BC).) Regarded as one of the most vibrant and individualistic rulers of his time, Nabonidus is characterised by some scholars as an unorthodox religious reformer and as the first archaeologist.

The origins of Nabonidus, his connection to previous royalty, and subsequently what claim he had to the throne remain unclear, given that Nabonidus made no genealogical claims of kinship to previous kings. This suggests that he was neither related nor connected to the Chaldean dynasty of Babylonian rulers. However, he is known to have had a prominent career of some kind before he became king. It is possible that he was connected to the Chaldean kings via marriage, possibly having married a daughter of Nebuchadnezzar II (r. 605–562 BC). Nabonidus's mother, Adad-guppi, was of Assyrian ancestry. His father, Nabu-balatsu-iqbi, of whom little is known, may also have been either Assyrian or Babylonian. Some historians have speculated that either Adad-guppi or Nabu-balatsu-iqbi were members of the Sargonid dynasty, rulers of the Neo-Assyrian Empire until its fall in 609 BC.

Nabonidus was, to his own apparent surprise, proclaimed king after the deposition and murder of Labashi-Marduk (r. 556 BC) in a plot likely led by Nabonidus's son Belshazzar. Throughout his reign, inscriptions and later sources suggest that Nabonidus worked to increase the status of the moon god Sîn and decrease the status of Babylon's traditional national deity Marduk. While some have suggested that Nabonidus wished to go as far as to completely replace Marduk with Sîn as the head of the Mesopotamian pantheon, the extent to which Nabonidus's devotion to Sîn led to religious reforms is debated. Nabonidus was in self-imposed exile in Tayma, Arabia from 552 to 543/542 BC. The reason for this is unknown, though it might have been due to disagreements with the Babylonian clergy and oligarchy. Belshazzar acted as regent in Babylonia during this period, while Nabonidus continued to be recognised as the king.

When Nabonidus returned to Babylonia in 543/542 BC, he escalated his religious efforts and rebuilt the Eḫulḫul, the temple dedicated to Sîn in the major northern city of Harran. Nabonidus's reign came to an abrupt end with the quick victory over his empire by Cyrus the Great in 539 BC. After the decisive battle of Opis, the Persians entered Babylon without a fight. Several sources state that Nabonidus was captured but spared, and possibly allowed leave to the region of Carmania. He may have been alive in exile as late as the reign of Darius the Great (r. 522–486 BC).

== Background ==
=== Ancestry and connection to royalty ===
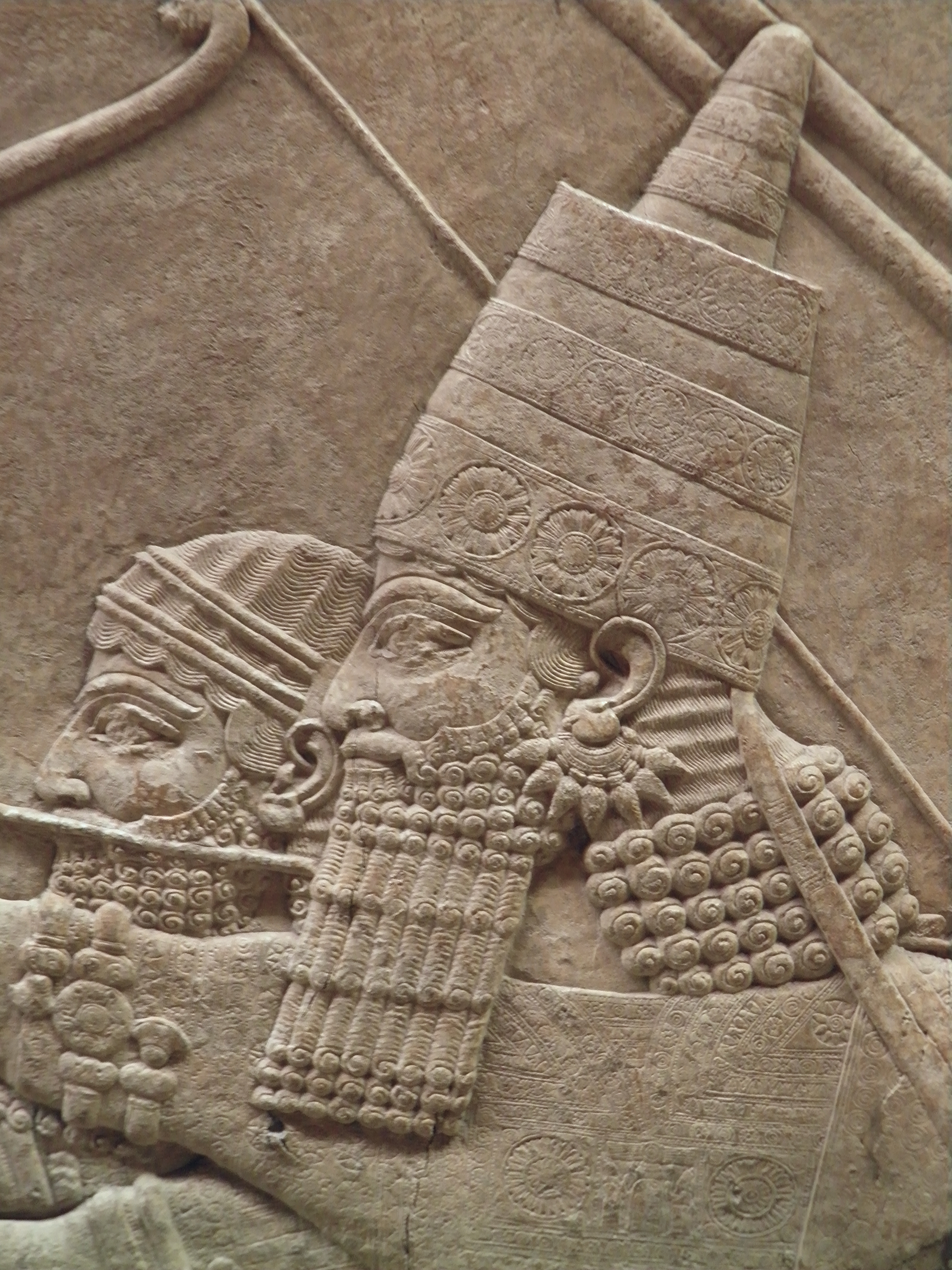
Relief of Ashurbanipal, who ruled as king of Assyria 669–631 BC. Nabonidus emulated elements of Ashurbanipal and his dynasty, the Sargonids. Some historians believe that Nabonidus was a descendant of Ashurbanipal, or Ashurbanipal's father Esarhaddon.

The origins of Nabonidus are obscure, with the scarce available details about him leaving much room for interpretation and speculation. In one of his inscriptions, Nabonidus states the following:

I am Nabonidus, the only son, who has nobody. In my mind there was no thought of kingship.

Nabonidus's father was a man by the name Nabu-balatsu-iqbi, whom Nabonidus refers to in his inscriptions as a "learned counsellor", "wise prince", "perfect prince" and "heroic governor". That Nabu-balatsu-iqbi is not given a connection to any Babylonian king in Nabonidus's inscriptions, it is typically assumed to indicate that Nabonidus was not closely connected to Babylonia's ruling dynasty (the Chaldean dynasty). In his inscriptions, Nabonidus refers to those who preceded him as kings of Babylon, but he does not claim descent from any of them. In no inscription does Nabonidus elaborate on his father's origin and ethnicity, merely mentioning his name and writing that he was courageous, wise and devout. Curiously, no person named Nabu-balatsu-iqbi who can reasonably be identified as Nabonidus's father appears in documents prior to Nabonidus's reign, thus making his father's status and position unclear. The repeated references of Nabu-balatsu-iqbi as "prince" in Nabonidus's inscriptions suggests some sort of noble status and political importance.

In his own inscriptions, Nabonidus adopted Assyrian royal titles, claimed an Assyrian ancestry and Assyrian royal lineage. According to Paul-Alain Beaulieu, a Canadian Assyriologist, Nabonidus considered his reign over Babylon as a resurrection of a universal empire on the Assyrian and Akkadian model.

Nabonidus's mother was Adad-guppi, born in c. 648/649 BC. Although once assumed to have been part of the Babylonian royal harem, no evidence exists to date that Adad-guppi was indeed the concubine of Nabonidus's predecessors. She was, however, influential at the royal Babylonian court, according to her own inscriptions claiming that she wielded influence with the kings Nabopolassar (r. 626–605 BC), Nebuchadnezzar II (r. 605–562 BC) and Neriglissar (r. 560–556 BC). While no conclusive evidence currently exists, Adad-guppi is often assumed to have come from the major city Harran in northern Mesopotamia (where she later lived), and as having been of Assyrian ancestry.

According to Beaulieu, Nabonidus's later intense interest in Harran, a peripheral city of his empire, can only be explained if he and his mother had originated in Harran. The Dynastic Prophecy, a later document written after the conquest of Babylonia by Alexander the Great centuries later, corroborates that Nabonidus would have originated in Harran, as it regards Nabonidus as the founder, and sole representative, of the "dynasty of Harran". According to Beaulieu, Adad-guppi may have been Aramean, rather than Assyrian, as her name "seems to be Aramean". In Harran, Adad-guppi served as a priestess devoted to the moon god, Sîn. There is no evidence that Adad-guppi was a high-ranking priestess, as the only titles she claims in her inscriptions are "mother of Nabonidus" and "worshipper of Sîn, Ningal, Nusku and Sadarnunna".

Adad-guppi's association with Harran, and that she had likely married Nabu-balatsu-iqbi early in her life (as was the custom in ancient Mesopotamia), would mean that Nabu-balatsu-iqbi was most probably also a prominent resident of that city, and possibly of Assyrian or Aramean origin. Frauke Weiershäuser and Jamie Novotny speculated that Nabu-balatsu-iqbi could have been an Aramean chief. Stephen Herbert Langdon theorised that Nabu-balatsu-iqbi was a son of Esarhaddon (r. 681–669 BC) and thus one of Ashurbanipal's brothers, but there is no concrete evidence for this relation.

Per Nabonidus's own inscriptions and the inscriptions by Adad-guppi, wherein Nabonidus is called her "only son" several times, it can be confidently ascertained that Nabonidus was an only child. It is probable that Adad-guppi first came to Babylon as a prisoner after the Babylonians and Medes sacked Harran in 610 BC during the Medo-Babylonian conquest of the Assyrian Empire. By 610 BC, she was already 39 years old. Presumably, Nabonidus was already born at this point, though his exact year of birth is yet unknown. In one of her inscriptions, Adad-guppi claims to have seen her descendants down to her great-great-grandchildren (i.e. Nabonidus's great-grandchildren) in her lifetime, totalling four generations of descendants. If the time between generations is estimated at approximately 20–25 years, and assuming that her great-great-grandchildren were approximately five years old by the time of Adad-guppi's death, Nabonidus could not have been born later than c. 615 BC, however he could very well have been born earlier.

It is possible as well that Nabonidus married one of Nebuchadnezzar II's daughters, a marriage which could potentially have been secured through his mother's influence. Not only would such a connection explain Nabonidus's rise to the throne (being connected to the royal family) but it would also explain later historical traditions in which Nabonidus's son, Belshazzar, is described as Nebuchadnezzar II's descendant; as in the Book of Daniel in the Hebrew Bible, where Belshazzar is referred to as Nebuchadnezzar II's (grand)son. The claim of Belshazzar being Nebuchadnezzar II's descendant however, could also alternatively derive from royal propaganda, rather than true genealogical information. The ancient Greek historian Herodotus names the "last great queen" of the Babylonian Empire as Nitocris, but neither that name, nor any other name, is attested in contemporary Babylonian sources. Herodotus's description of Nitocris contains a wealth of legendary material making it difficult to determine whether he uses the name to refer to Nabonidus's wife or mother. William H. Shea proposed in 1982 that Nitocris may tentatively be identified as the name of Nabonidus's wife and Belshazzar's mother.

In her inscriptions, Adad-guppi also claimed that Nabonidus was from the dynastic line of Ashurbanipal (r. 669–631 BC), king of the Neo-Assyrian Empire. According to her inscriptions, Adad-guppi was born in Ashurbanipal's twentieth year as king. At the time of her birth, Harran had been a major Assyrian stronghold and when the Neo-Assyrian Empire fell in 609 BC, Harran was the capital of its government in exile. On account of her claims in regards to Nabonidus being of Sargonid (Ashurbanipal's dynasty) ancestry, Stephanie Dalley in 2003 considered it "almost certain" that Adad-guppi was a daughter of Ashurbanipal. Michael B. Dick opposed Dalley's conviction in 2004, pointing out that even though Nabonidus did go to some length to revive some old Assyrian symbols (such as wearing a wrapped cloak in his depictions, absent in those of other Neo-Babylonian kings but present in Assyrian art) and attempted to link himself to the Sargonid dynasty, there is "no evidence whatsoever that Nabonidus was related to the Sargonid dynasty". According to Beaulieu, that Adad-guppi did not explicitly claim any royal ancestors herself points to a humble origin. As inscriptions by female relatives of kings are relatively rare, it is however probable, according to Wilfred G. Lambert, that Adad-guppi was of some high status.

=== Pre-royal career ===
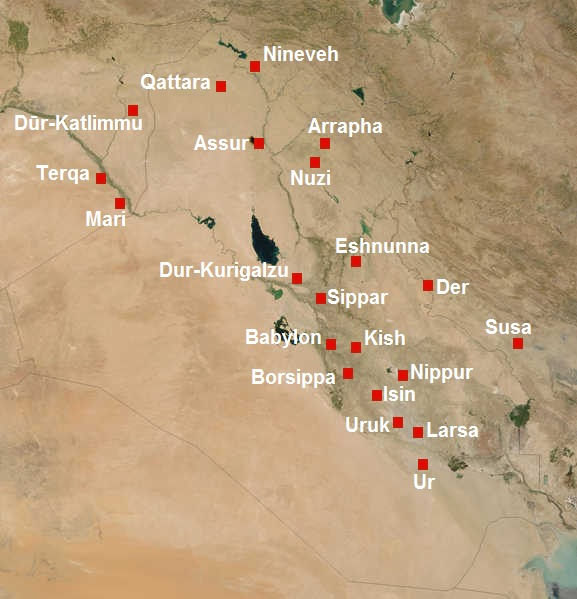
Locations of some major Mesopotamian cities

According to Herodotus, an official by the name Labynetus (the same name used for Nabonidus in ancient Greek sources) was present as a mediator and witness on behalf of Babylon at the negotiations conducted between the Median and Lydian kingdoms after the Battle of the Eclipse in 585 BC. It is possible that this ambassador was the same person as the Nabonidus who later became Babylon's king.

The name of Nabonidus is otherwise poorly attested in sources prior to his reign. A Nabonidus is listed as the head witnesses in a 597 BC legal document; however, it is unclear whether this is the same person as the later king, especially given that the text could be interpreted as referring to Nabonidus as a son of Nebuchadnezzar II. However, it is unlikely that king Nabonidus would have failed to mention being a son of Nebuchadnezzar II. If they are the same person, and the document does not call him the son of the king, his office listed in the document, ša muḫḫi āli (an official in charge of a city) would mean that the date of Nabonidus's birth has to be pushed back further, to before 620 BC, to account for the age necessary to hold that office. If the Nabonidus mentioned is not Nebuchadnezzar II's son, then the document does not name the father of this Nabonidus, which suggests that he was of high rank (fathers and grandfathers were otherwise usually mentioned for distinguishing purposes), and he could then conceivably be the same person as the later king. The wording could be interpreted as "the son of a man of the king" (i.e. a prince), rather than "the son of the king", which in that case, would explain Nabonidus' references to his father as a prince, in his royal inscriptions.

There is also another letter from some point between the early 590s BC and the 570s BC, wherein a Nabonidus is described as having requested the levies of a particular region to be raised. Whether this Nabonidus is the same person as the future king is also unclear. The lack of confident mentions of Nabonidus in sources before his rise to the throne could suggest the possibility that Nabonidus was not his birth name, but an assumed regnal name, however the meaning of the name, i.e., "may Nabû be exalted", weakens that possibility.

The Babylonian historian Berossus, active centuries later during the Hellenistic period, wrote that Nabonidus had been a 'priest of Bêl'. A religious function could possibly explain Nabonidus's absence of mention in earlier documents. In her inscriptions, Adad-guppi claims to have introduced her son Nabonidus to king Nebuchadnezzar II and king Neriglissar, and that Nabonidus thereafter performed duties for them "day and night" and "regularly did whatever pleased them". As Nabonidus is considered to have been a learned man, one who knew how to write, and who quarreled with numerous priests and scholars, it is possible that he was a courtier at the royal court before he became king; however, no records of a prominent courtier by his name are known.

== Reign ==
=== Rise to the throne ===
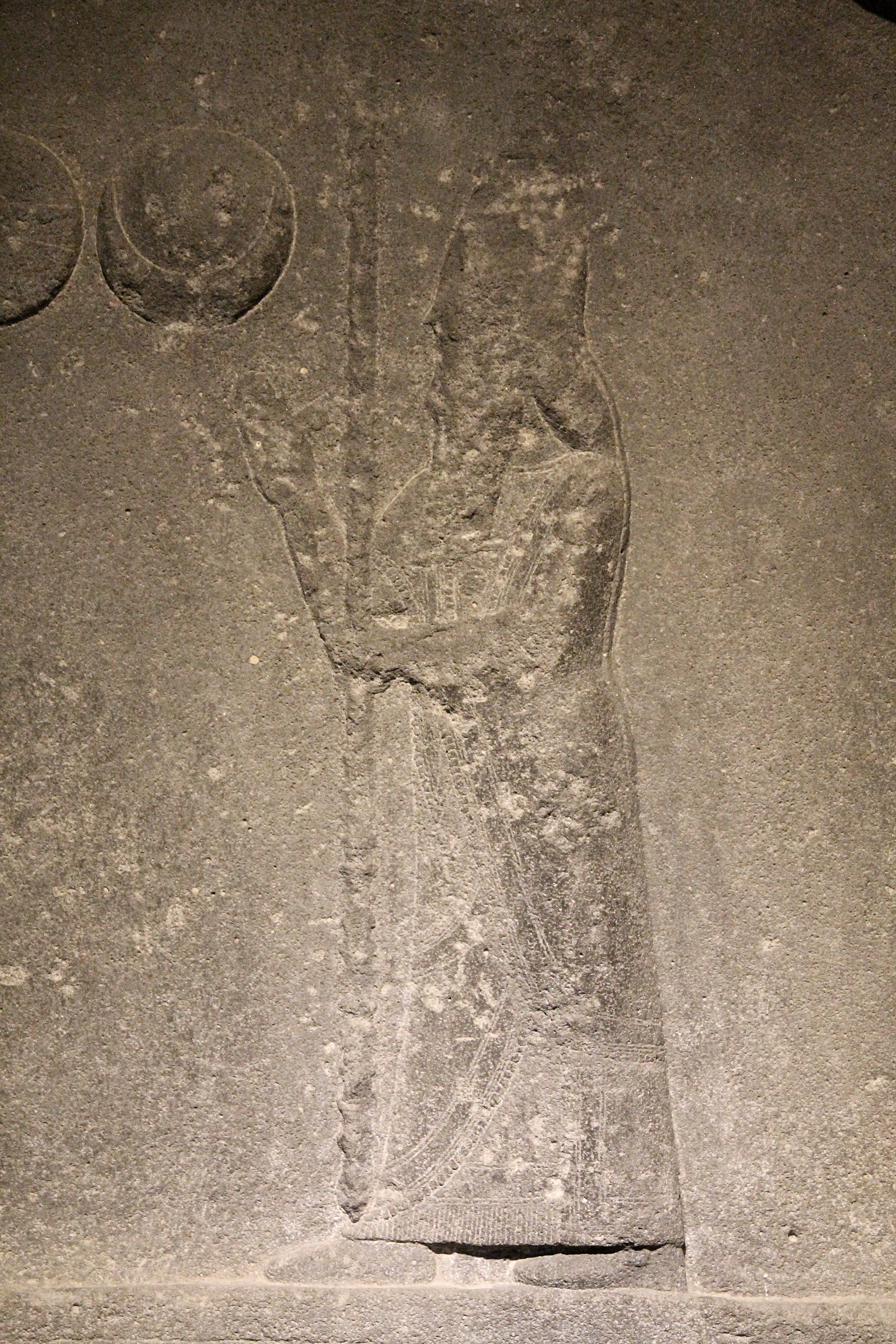
Nabonidus as depicted in a stele from Harran

Nabonidus rose to the throne in the aftermath of the collapse of the direct dynastic line of the Chaldean dynasty. After the brief reign of Neriglissar, a son-in-law of Nebuchadnezzar II, the throne had been inherited in April 556 BC by Neriglissar's son Labashi-Marduk. Berossus erroneously wrote that Labashi-Marduk ruled for nine months (though this might be attributable to a scribal error) and stated that Labashi-Marduk's "evil ways" led to his friends plotting against him, eventually resulting in the "child king" being beaten to death. The plotters then agreed that Nabonnedos (Nabonidus), one of the plotters, should rule. The reason for the coup against Labashi-Marduk is unknown. It is possible that despite Labashi-Marduk and his father being well-connected and wealthy, they were ultimately seen as commoners, lacking noble blood. Though Labashi-Marduk may have been the grandson of Nebuchadnezzar II through his mother, making him part of the royal bloodline, it is also possible he was the son of Neriglissar and a different wife. Thus, Labashi-Marduk's rise to the throne might have signified a true break in the dynasty of Nebuchadnezzar II and might as such have aroused opposition from the Babylonian populace. Although Berossus refers to Labashi-Marduk as a child, it is possible that he became king as an adult since commercial texts from two years earlier indicate that Labashi-Marduk was in charge of his own affairs at that time.

Though Nabonidus in his inscriptions claims that he had few supporters and that he did not covet the throne himself, he must have been a leading figure in the conspiracy that led to the deposition and death of Labashi-Marduk. Nabonidus enjoyed consistent support from the Babylonian military throughout his reign and it is possible that the army played a role in his rise to the throne. Though Berossus claimed Labashi-Marduk ruled for nine months, the Uruk King List only gives Labashi-Marduk a reign of three months and contract tablets from Babylonia suggest that he might have ruled as briefly as just two months. It appears that there was a period of either confusion, after a discreet palace coup, or a brief civil war. Per contract tablets, Labashi-Marduk was still recognised as king at Uruk up until at least 19 June, and in the city of Sippar until at least 20 June. The earliest tablet dated to the reign of Nabonidus at Sippar is from 26 June. However, a tablet written as early as 25 May from Nippur is dated to Nabonidus's reign and the last tablet dated to Labashi-Marduk's reign at Babylon itself is from 24 May. The earliest tablet dated to Nabonidus at Babylon itself is from 14 July. This evidence can be reconciled by positing that Nabonidus may have been recognised in the Babylonian heartland, including Nippur and Babylon, already on 25 May, whereas some outlying cities continued to recognise Labashi-Marduk (even though he quite possibly was dead at the time on account of a possible palace coup) as king until June. By the end of June 556 BC, tablets dated to Nabonidus are known from across Babylonia.

On account of his mother's age, and Nabonidus having had a long career in royal service before 556 BC, he must have been relatively old by the time he became king. It appears that Nabonidus had not intended to become king, and that he accepted the kingship reluctantly. Though a reluctance to accept royal power is often used as a form of royal propaganda, there are several inscriptions by Nabonidus, some dated more than a decade into his reign (at a point when he no longer needed to justify his rule with legitimacy) wherein he points out that he did not covet the throne. In one inscription, Nabonidus describes himself as visiting the sanctuaries of Marduk and Nabû in search for guidance, with a troubled conscience and questioning if his accession was legitimate:

The heart of Marduk, my lord, calmed down. Reverently I praised (him) and sought after his sanctuary with prayers and supplications. Thus I addressed (my) prayers to him, telling him what was in my heart: Let me indeed be a king who pleases your heart, I who, not knowing, had no thought of kingship for myself, when you, O lord of lords, have entrusted me with (a rulership) more important than the rulerships which have been exerted in the past by other kings whom you have called. Lengthen my days, may my years become old, let me fulfill the function of the provider.

It is thus possible that whereas Nabonidus was a prominent figure in the group of conspirators that deposed and killed Labashi-Marduk, he had no intention of assuming the throne himself but was convinced to by the other conspirators. It is probable that the chief orchestrator behind the conspiracy against Labashi-Marduk was Nabonidus's son, Belshazzar. Belshazzar was the chief beneficiary of the entire affair, as he became the designated heir to the throne, and also inherited the large private estates of Labashi-Marduk, becoming one of the richest and most prominent men in Babylonia overnight. Belshazzar could not have claimed the throne for himself while his father was still alive, but by placing his father on the throne, an old man (meaning that his reign could be expected to be transitional, only lasting a few years), Belshazzar thought the throne secured for himself in the future.

=== Early reign ===
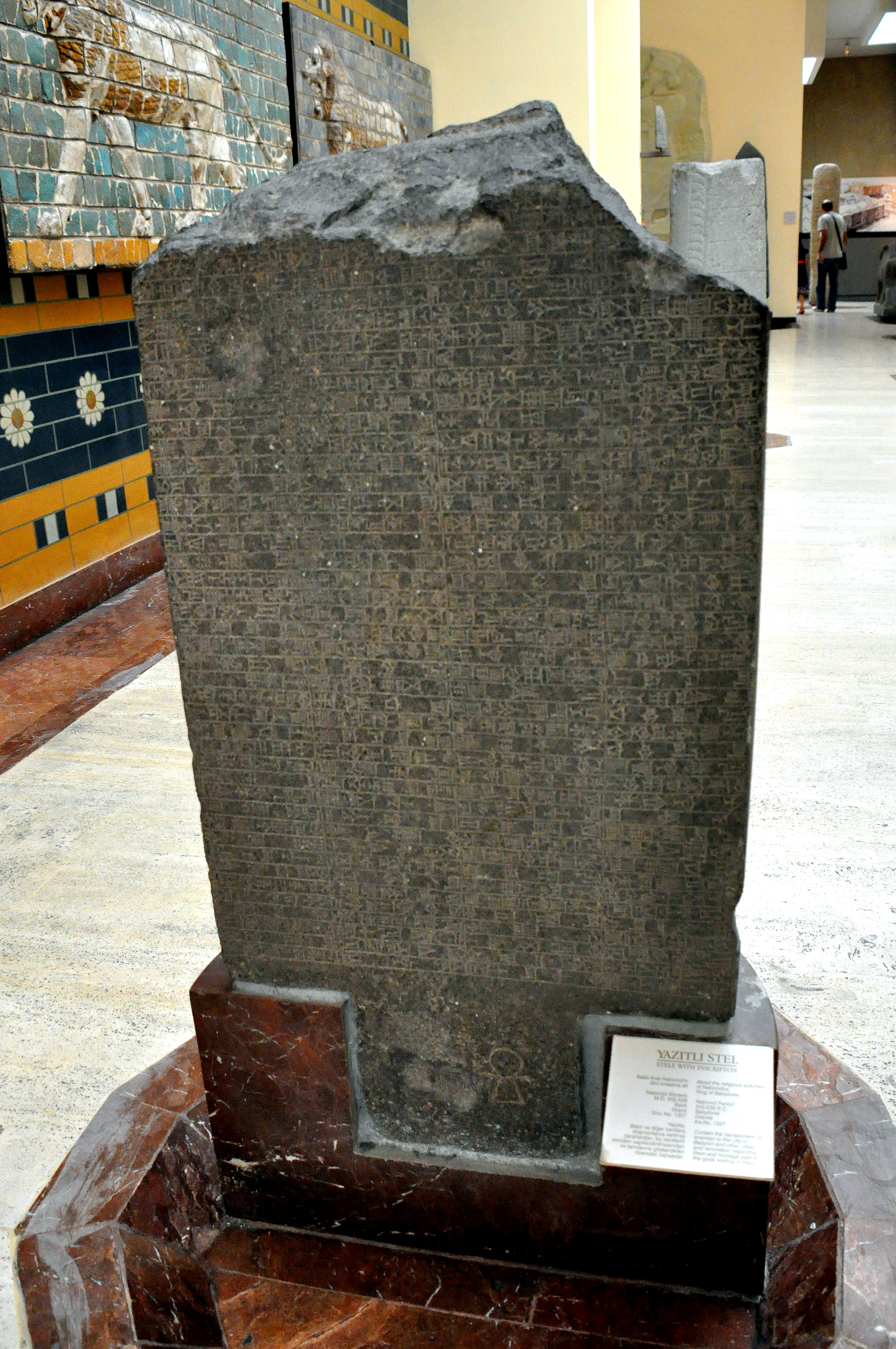
A granite stele of Nabonidus

The earliest recorded activity of Nabonidus as king was visiting the city of Sippar on 4 July 556 BC, where he donated three minas of gold in the city's temple, the Ebabbar temple. The purpose of the visit may have been political, given that Sippar recognised Labashi-Marduk as king just two weeks prior, nearly a month after Nabonidus had been proclaimed king.

In the fall of 556 BC, Nabonidus led the Babylonian army on a campaign to Hume, eastern Cilicia, where Neriglissar had campaigned in 557 BC. That Nabonidus campaigned there so shortly after Neriglissar's campaign could suggest that Syria, which was under Bablyonian suzerainty, was threatened by raiders from Cilicia, or could point towards Nabonidus, in general, being concerned about the security of the empire. This initial campaign was successful and prisoners, gifts and booty were brought back to Babylon to use in the annual New Year's festival. Babylonian records give the number of prisoners later distributed as temple slaves as 2,850. After celebrating the New Year's festival, Nabonidus embarked on a short trip to southern Babylonia, visiting the cities of Kish, Larsa, Uruk and Ur. At Uruk, he conducted detailed reorganisations of the Eanna temple, making adjustments to the scheme of sacrificial offerings, and restored some offerings that had been interrupted under Neriglissar's reign. One inscription suggests that Nabonidus went on a second successful campaign to Cilicia in 555 BC, on the way perhaps attacking the city Hama in Syria, but the record is fragmentary.

Though Nabonidus made the traditional royal donations to the temples in Babylon, the major building effort of his reign, proclaimed as his intention shortly after he became king, was restoring the temple Eḫulḫul, the temple dedicated to Sîn in Harran, which had been destroyed by the Medes in 610 BC. Nabonidus noted at the beginning of his reign that the date of the temple's destruction was a strange coincidence: it had been destroyed exactly 54 years before he became king. 54 years is three 18-year cycles, or a complete cycle of the moon. Though the Elhulkhul was not restored until after Nabonidus returned from a long period of staying in Tayma in Arabia, it is possible that construction work started considerably earlier and it appears to have been his goal since he assumed the throne. Nabonidus's inscriptions also mention that the Medes threatened Harran, "surrounding" it, and it is possible that building work was postponed until later in his reign due to the threat of Median raiders disturbing the building efforts. According to his inscriptions Nabonidus had been ordered to restore the temple by both Marduk and Sîn in a dream, and the gods had assured him that the Medes would eventually be restored so that construction could begin without being threatened by raids. In addition to Nabonidus's own religious beliefs, the restoration of the Eḫulḫul, and the city of Harran surrounding it, may also have been politically motivated. Since the downfall of Assyria, political hegemony in the Near East had been divided between Babylonia and the Medes, an issue that remained unresolved by the time of Nabonidus. As Nabonidus often refers to, and likens himself to, his predecessors Nebuchadnezzar II and Neriglissar, both conquerors and warriors, and several inscriptions allude to Nabonidus being preoccupied with military matters in his accession year, it seems that Nabonidus was preparing to resolve the matter.

=== Nabonidus in Tayma ===
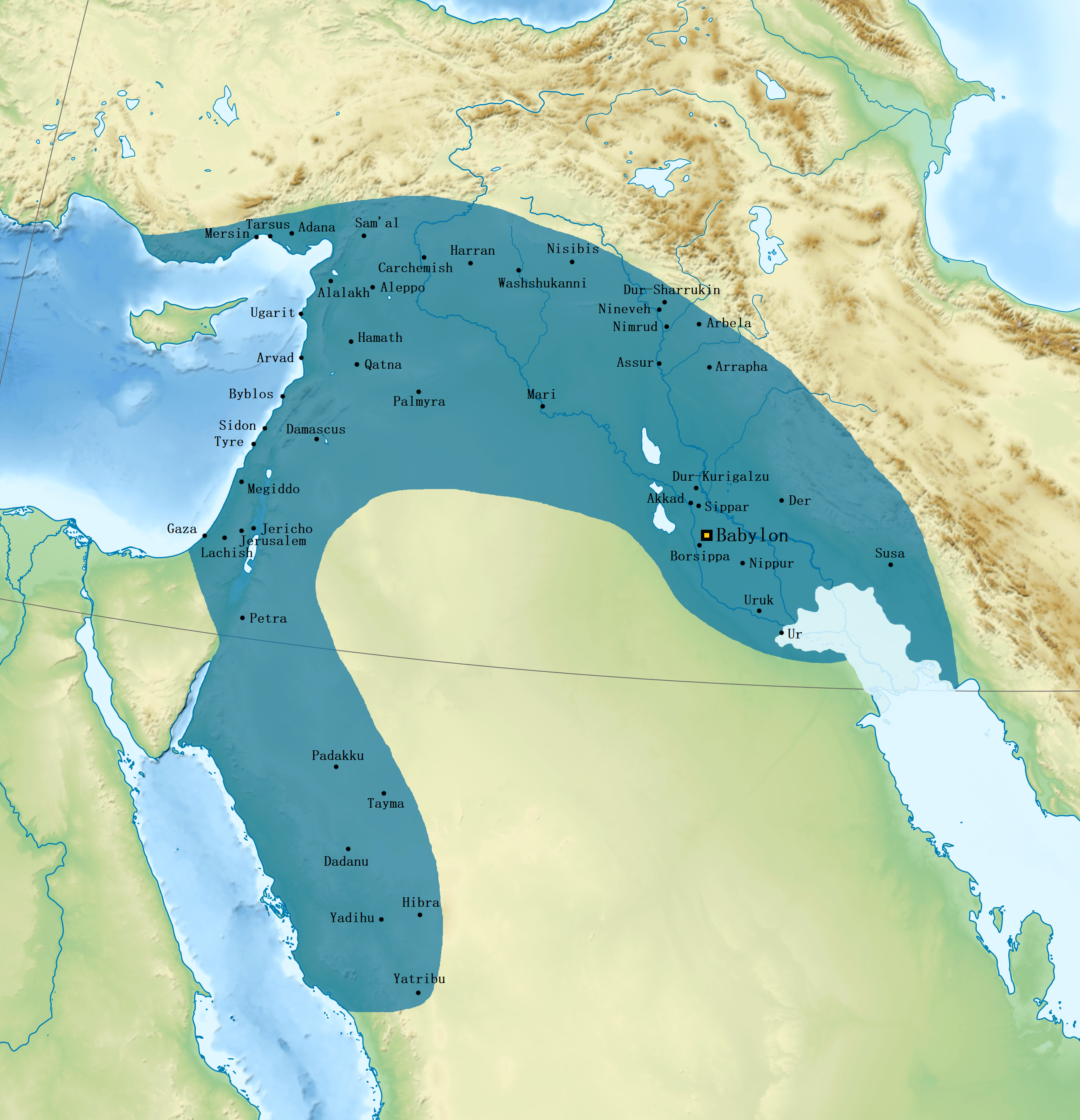
Map of the Neo-Babylonian Empire under Nabonidus. Tayma is in northern Arabia, in the south-west of the empire.

In May 553 BC, Nabonidus departed to campaign in Arabia, initially to suppress a rebellion in the Anti-Lebanon Mountains. The Babylonians achieved victory relatively quickly, and Nabonidus still remained near the Anti-Lebanon Mountains in August, overseeing the transport of supplies back to Babylon. After a period of illness, Nabonidus then moved on Amurru and Edom and captured an otherwise unknown city. By December 553 BC or January 552 BC, Nabonidus was campaigning in Arabia, fighting against the king of Dadanu. By March or April, Nabonidus had defeated the king of Dadanu, and had captured other cities in Arabia, including the city of Tayma, which he had established as a provisionary seat for himself by the summer of 552 BC. Babylonian sources state that Nabonidus conquered Arabian lands as far south as Medina (called Yatribu at this time). After conquering Tayma, Nabonidus would stay there for about a decade, not returning to Babylon until September or October of 543 or 542 BC. October 543 BC is the return date most supported by surviving Babylonian documentation. The purpose for this prolonged stay, effectively self-exile, in Tayma are unclear and debated, with no proposed explanation having universal support.

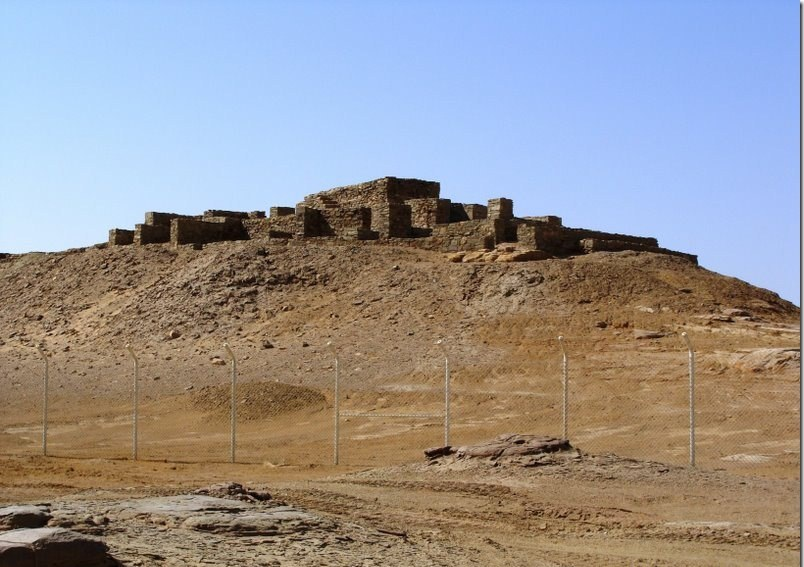
Ancient ruins at Tayma

The history of this period is poorly known and cannot be reconstructed in great detail, on account of a lack of sources. Entries in several royal chronicles for this period are completely, or nearly completely, missing. According to the Verse Account of Nabonidus, a biased document probably written in the reign of Cyrus the Great (who ultimately deposed Nabonidus), Nabonidus conducted extensive building work at Tayma, fortifying it with new walls, embellishing it with new buildings and constructing a royal palace similar to, but likely considerably smaller than, his royal palace at Babylon, essentially rebuilding the city in a Babylonian fashion. Modern archaeological excavations at Tayma have revealed that the city underwent considerable expansion during the 6th century, including the construction of an extensive irrigation system. Some motifs on some of the ruins point towards a clear Babylonian influence, such as an offering table with a crescent, a star and a winged disk (reminiscent of religious motifs in Babylonia).

The reason for the Arabian campaign in the first place is not difficult to ascertain, as it probably represents the next step in the growing expansionism of Babylonia in the west. Babylonian forces had first come into contact with the Arabian kingdoms proper with the conquest of the Levant from Assyria, and the campaign was most likely intended to expand the Babylonian Empire westwards. Due to the many trade routes passing through Arabia, the region was incredibly wealthy and represented an appealing target. It is possible that the intention of conquering Tayma was to control these important trade routes that ran through the city (including the major trade route from Egypt to Babylon). To efficiently reap the benefits of the trade route, authority would have had to be enforced by a strong, local Babylonian force. However, stationing a Babylonian force at Tayma and leaving a governor in charge would have sufficed, the king would not have needed to stay in Arabia for ten years in order to pacify the region. Furthermore, beyond economical gains, the Tayma region was not of much strategic use. The Arabs were not a threat to Babylon, or any other power at this time, and though Egypt was a potentially powerful adversary, dealing with the Egyptians through fortifying a city isolated deep in Arabia, rather than fortifying and garrisoning the Babylonian lands in Palestine, would have been an unlikely strategy. Due to the remote and inaccessible location of Tayma, an argument that Nabonidus intended to move the centre of gravity of his empire westwards, through constructing a new capital there, has no basis.

Though Nabonidus could have been motivated to stay in Tayma for religious reasons, given that there were several prominent lunar deities in the region and Nabonidus was a devotee of the moon god Sîn, it seems unlikely that such a large endeavour would have been motivated solely by faith. Per Wiseman, any religious explanations for the prolonged stay at Tayma can be discarded as no sources mention the presence or construction of Babylonian temples, or a temple dedicated to Sîn, in the city. Beaulieu also points out that the Verse Account of Nabonidus, otherwise very focused on the king's religious beliefs, makes no mention of any religious activities at Tayma, which it surely would have done had the campaign and prolonged stay been religiously motivated.

During Nabonidus's stay at Tayma, his son and heir Belshazzar was put in charge of ruling in Babylon as regent. It is possible that the prolonged stay in Tayma was the result of a political struggle with a faction, possibly led by his own son Belshazzar, opposing Nabonidus's reformist religious stance, and an agreement was reached to go into self-imposed exile while Belshazzar ruled as regent in Babylon. In his own inscriptions, Nabonidus attributes his stay at Tayma to the "impiety of the Babylonians".

Nabonidus probably only campaigned in the west after making sure that the Medes in the north were no longer a threat. Beaulieu believes it possible that Nabonidus had encouraged Cyrus the Great to rebel and wage war against the Medes, and had even allied with him, seeing as the beginning of Nabonidus's stay in Tayma coincides with the beginning of Cyrus's reign. Per, Beaulieu: "unless one assumes that the king was totally devoid of strategic ability, it seems hard to believe that he would have engaged a significant part of the Babylonian army in a long campaign to Arabia without making sure that the northern and eastern borders of the empire would be secure, at least for a certain number of years". As the stay in Tayma continued, Cyrus the Great consolidated a vast empire under his rule. Belshazzar as regent became acutely aware of the threat presented by Cyrus's growing Achaemenid Empire, as he is recorded as having expended resources at projects in Sippar and nearby defenses.

=== Religious policies ===
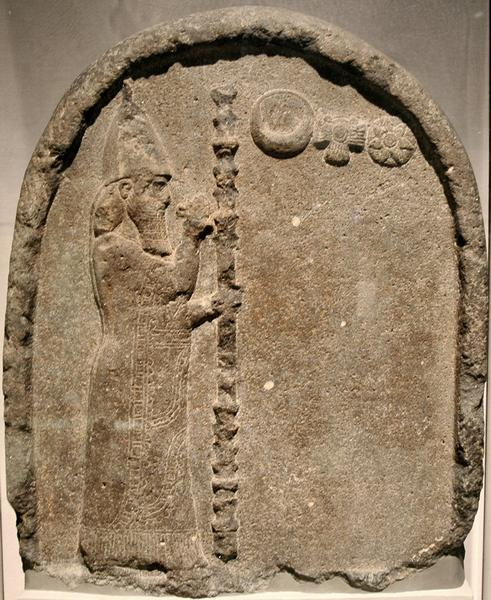
The Harran Stela, depicting Nabonidus as praying to the moon (i.e. Sîn), the sun and Venus

Nabonidus has typically been characterised as attempting religious reforms in Babylonia, wishing to raise the moon god Sîn to the status of supreme deity and demoting the Babylonian national deity Marduk. The elevation of Sîn was similar to how the deity Inanna was elevated to a prominent position in Uruk during the time of the Akkadian Empire, more than a thousand years prior, or how Marduk had originally been elevated in Babylonia under Nebuchadnezzar I (r. c. 1125–1104 BC). In contrast to these earlier successful exaltations, the attempt to elevate Sîn met with failure. This failure is because the exaltation of Sîn met with considerable opposition within Babylonia itself, and because the invasion and conquest by the Persians put an end to the political means with which the exaltation could be completed.

In addition to building inscriptions, the Verse Account of Nabonidus also alludes to attempts to establish Sîn as the foremost god of the Mesopotamian pantheon. The publication of the Verse Account in 1924 saw scholarly attention being given to other inscriptions and records concerning Nabonidus. Notably, many of his inscriptions fail to acknowledge Marduk as the head of the pantheon, or omit him entirely, and they often contain disproportionate praise for Sîn. It seems probable that Nabonidus's devotion to Sîn steadily increased throughout his reign, as the epithets granted to Marduk and Sîn throughout his reign varied considerably. Even early in his reign, the epithets granted to Marduk were only the minimum, epithets such as "king of the gods", "lord of lords" and "leader of the gods", a notably smaller array of titles than usual. In contrast Sîn is granted a large array of epithets, including some previously unheard of, with examples such as "shining god", "light of mankind", "exalted god" and "exalted lord". Nabonidus could hardly have moved to issue religious reforms early in his reign, especially as he had only taken the throne through usurpation. His early inscriptions are ostensibly orthodox, though point towards intentional restraint in glorifying Marduk and intentional disproportionate glorification of Sîn.

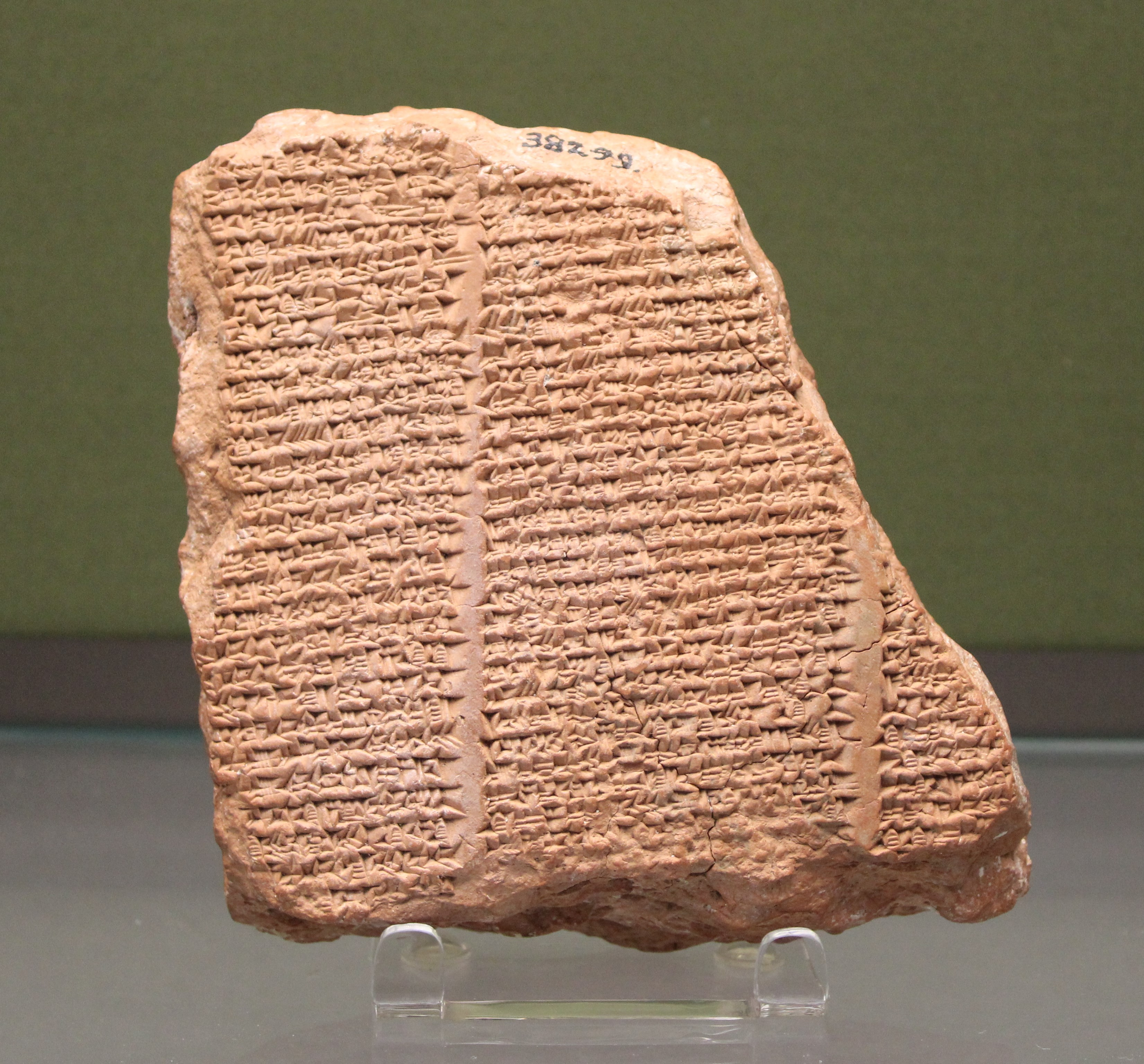
The Verse Account of Nabonidus, a biased document written about Nabonidus's reign, probably in the reign of Cyrus the Great

Inscriptions from the time Nabonidus spent in Tayma seem to suggest that the king returned to "orthodoxy" during this period, with inscriptions no longer glorifying Sîn to a disproportionate degree (the deity barely being mentioned) and instead giving Marduk more elaborate and appropriate epithets, such as "foremost of the gods", "lofty king of the gods", "lord of everything" and "king of heaven and the underworld". These inscriptions stand in sharp contrast to inscriptions by Nabonidus in the years after his return to Babylon, wherein Sîn is repeatedly exalted and Marduk is more or less ignored, with the exception of one inscriptions where he appears merely as Sîn's companion. It is possible that the return to orthodoxy during Nabonidus's time in Tayma was because Babylonia was under the regency of Belshazzar, who might have convinced Nabonidus to stay away from Babylonia and instituted a clear return to orthodoxy, fearing confrontation with the oligarchy and clergy.

Inscriptions from the time after Nabonidus's return to Babylon suggest he was no longer hesitant to exalt Sîn, and that he began imposing a religious reform that went as far as to reject Marduk, who had been Babylon's undisputed supreme deity for at least six centuries. Several inscriptions attribute Marduk's traditional titles, for instance "king of the gods" and "father and creator of the gods" to Sîn, for instance this inscription concerning building work at the Ebabbar temple in Larsa (not the same temple as that of the same name at Sippar), attributes Marduk's traditional titles to Sîn:

As for the Ebabbar, the temple of Šamaš at Larsa, because in distant days Sîn, the king of the gods, the lord of the gods and goddesses dwelling in heaven and the underworld, became angry with that city and temple, big heaps of sand accumulated over it and its chapel could not be seen anymore.

Some inscriptions also point towards an attempt at historical revisionism, with the successes of Nebuchadnezzar II being attributed to in inscriptions not to Marduk, but to Sîn, and one inscription describing Sîn, rather than the Assyrian deity Ashur, as having entrusted the Assyrian kings Esarhaddon and Ashurbanipal with universal rule. Sîn also replaced Marduk's role of calling rulers forth for kingship. One inscription states that Nabonidus had been destined for kingship by the deities Sîn and Ningal (Sîn's consort) in his mother's womb. The exaltation of Sîn reached its height after the rebuilding of the Eḫulḫul and Nabonidus's latest known text containing religious elements goes as far as to refer to Marduk's traditional dwellings in Babylon, the temples Esagila and Ezida, as the temples and dwellings of Sîn. Though it does not appear that the Esagila was ever "usurped" by Sîn, replacing Marduk in the temple by Sîn was a plan seriously considered by Nabonidus, who justified it by pointing out that there was lunar symbolism in temple through it being marked with a crescent symbol, which must have meant that it was originally intended for Sîn. In one inscription, Sîn is given the epithet "god of gods", the highest known epithet ever given to a Mesopotamian deity.

Concrete evidence surrounding Nabonidus's religious ideas is relatively scarce and no surviving documents contain any theological foundations for the king's faith and beliefs. Not all historians share the view that Nabonidus was a religious reformer. According to Donald Wiseman, Nabonidus "did not seek to create any exclusive role for [Sîn] in Babylon". Wiseman characterises Nabonidus as deeply religious and in support of Marduk, as all other Babylonian kings. In addition to the Elhulkhul temple, Nabonidus is also recorded in inscriptions as having conducted restoration work at temples in Babylon itself, Larsa, Sippar and Nippur. Wiseman attributes the opposition by religious official towards Nabonidus to that the king had introduced a new royal cash box in temples and sanctuaries, wherein some of the income of the temples was to be provided to the king, under the supervision of royal officials, and notes that Cyrus the Great's later documents referring to Nabonidus as irreverent in regards to Marduk could be propaganda. Though Nabonidus uses uncharacteristically high epithets for Sîn in many inscriptions, Weiherhäuser and Novotny pointed out that a majority of these epithets are generally limited to inscriptions and texts that document work on the Eḫulḫul temple in Harran, Sîn's cultic centre. Thus, Weiherhäuser and Novotny do not consider the evidence strong enough to support the idea that Nabonidus fanatically promoted Sîn, and sought to fully replace Marduk, within Babylonia itself.

=== Late reign and fall of Babylon ===
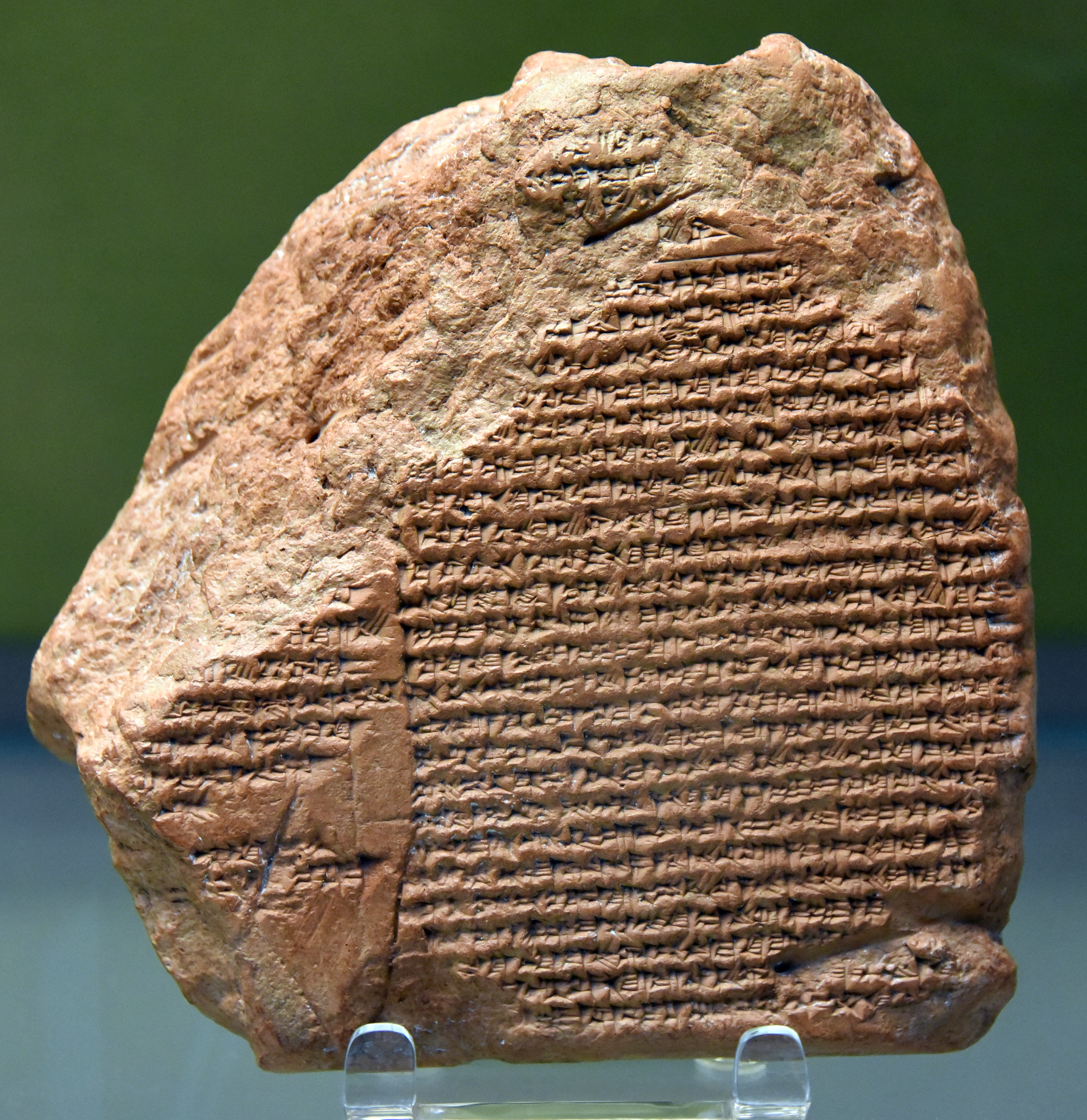
The Nabonidus Chronicle. Written under the later period of Persian rule, this tablet derided Nabonidus and his reign, recording his long absence from Babylon and criticising his religious policies.

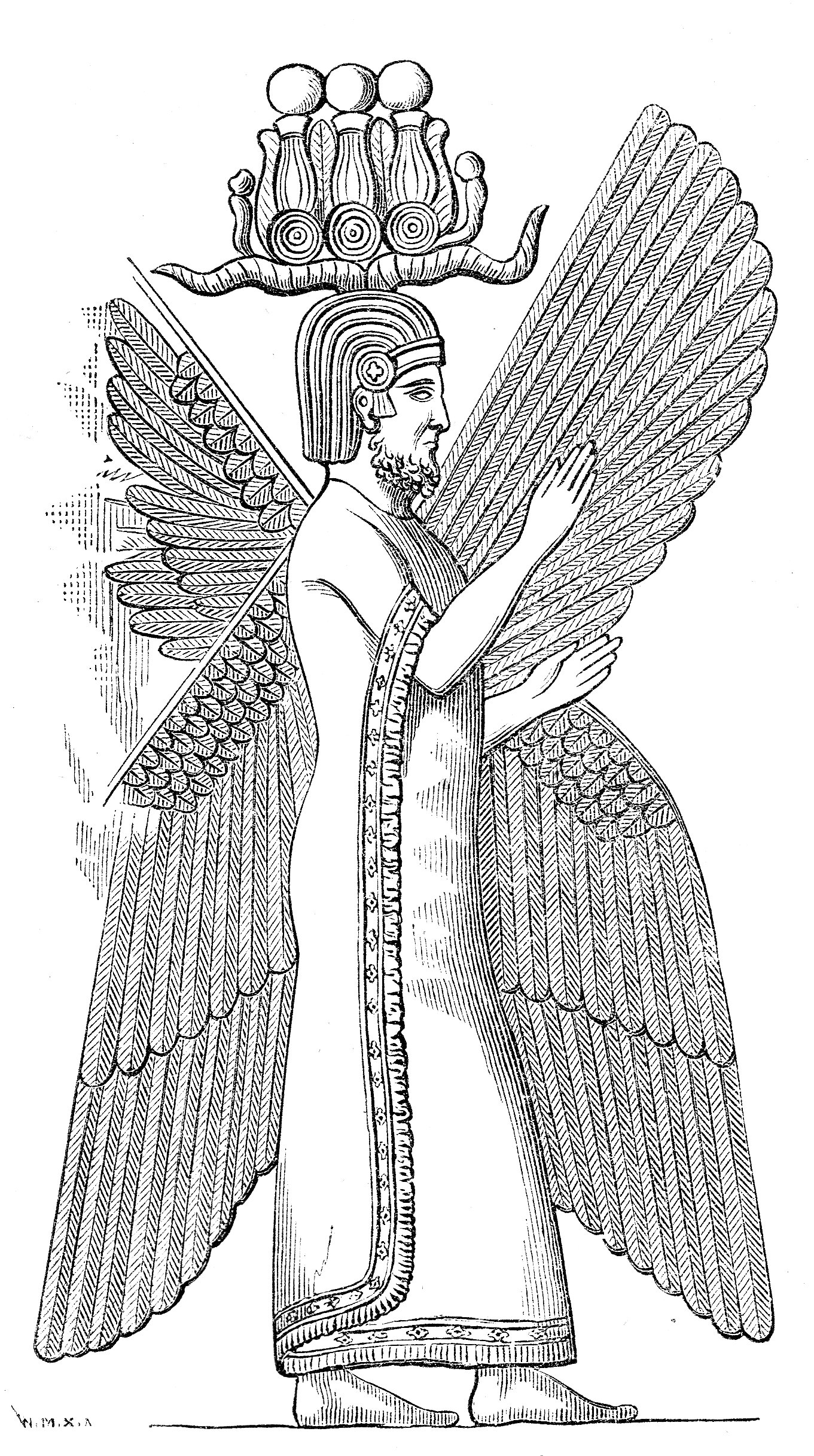
Cyrus the Great, who conquered Babylon in 539 BC, depicted with a Hemhem crown, or four-winged Cherub tutelary divinity

It is unclear why Nabonidus returned to Babylon from Tayma. Potential explanations include fearing the growing power of Cyrus the Great or perhaps serious disagreements with Belshazzar on religion and the extent of his authority. Upon his return, he also swiftly began to seriously institute his intended religious reforms, perhaps expending so much effort because of his advanced age and wanting to see the reforms through before he died. The major project of Nabonidus's later reign was the completion of the building projects at the Eḫulḫul in Harran, with the temple rebuilt directly on top of its original foundation. Nabonidus himself considered the rebuilding of the temple to be the major achievement of his reign. Building work was also conducted in Ur, Larsa, Sippar and Akkad. Some evidence suggests that there was famine in Babylonia during Nabonidus's later reign. Nabonidus appears to have attributed it to a sign of Sîn's wrath that the people were not responsive to the king's religious reforms, whereas the populace likely attributed it to Marduk's wrath with the king's heretical faith.

The New Year's festival, suspended during the king's absence in Tayma, was celebrated in its traditional manner annually once again after Nabonidus returned. It is noteworthy that the festival was suspended in Nabonidus's absence given that it was effectively an annual reinstatement of Marduk's authority and was conducted to ensure the well-being of Babylon. The threat of Cyrus loomed ever closer. Though the records are too fragmentary to tell with certainty, it appears that there was already a confrontation between Persian and Babylonian troops in the winter of 540/539 BC, near Uruk. After the celebration of the New Year's festival in 539 BC, Nabonidus had the statues of the gods of Uruk, Akkad, Kish, Marad and Khursagkalamma brought to the capital for safety, the conventional first step in anticipation of attacks from the north-east. This suggests that Nabonidus expected a Persian attack and was making preparations several months before it came. Though this was the conventional method to protect the divine statues in times of war (victorious enemies typically stole cultic statues), transport of statues in this fashion caused considerable disruption in the cults of the gods transported. For instance, the transport of the statue of Ishtar from Uruk to Babylon probably meant that offerings of food and drink had to be carried from Uruk to Babylon to give to the statue, to ensure that the cult was not interrupted.

Map of the path of Cyrus the Great during his 539 BC invasion of Babylonia

The gods of some cities close to Babylon, such as Cutha, Sippar and Borsippa, were not brought to the capital. The reason for this is not known, but speculative explanations have been proposed. Sidney Smith, who published the translation of the Nabonidus Cylinder, suggested in 1924 that Nabonidus could have summoned the statues of those cities to the capital as well, but that the local priesthoods were disgusted by Nabonidus's attempt at religious reform and thus refused. Smith later proposed an alternative hypothesis, wherein he postulated that Sippar, Borsippa and Cutha were in the Babylonian heartland, protected by strong fortifications and the Median Wall (built under Nebuchadnezzar II to protect against attacks from the north), and as such would not have needed to send their statues to Babylon for protection, whereas more outlying cities such as Uruk were not as well-protected. This seems unlikely given that Kish and Khursagkalamma were closer to Babylon than Sippar was. Furthermore, Stefan Zawadzki demonstrated in 2012 that Sippar did send certain gods to Babylon, just not their main statue of their patron deity Shamash. This means that the explanation of Sippar and the other cities refusing to send their gods to Babylon seems unlikely. Zawadzki offered several possible explanations, including that Sippar wished to celebrate its traditional cultic rituals, which were close in time to the Persian invasion, and that there thus was not any time to transfer the statue to Babylon, or that perhaps Nabonidus himself had ordered the statue to remain in Sippar. Nabonidus might have ordered this since he intended to stop the Persians a short distance north of Sippar, and removing the statue from Sippar could have been construed as Nabonidus not having faith in his own victory.

Shortly after the last gods had entered Babylon, Cyrus invaded Babylonia. Despite Nabonidus's preparations, Babylonia fell to the Persians relatively quickly, the conflict lasting less than a month. It seems probable that the Persian invasion was preceded by a revolt by a man by the name Ugbaru, who might have been the appointed Babylonian governor of the region of Gutium. Ugbaru revolted against Nabonidus, joined Cyrus, and was made the primary general in the Babylonian campaign. Depending on when it took place, Ugbaru's revolt may have been one of the factors that made Nabonidus return from Tayma. Cyrus's first move was to attack the city of Opis. The battle of Opis was a decisive Persian victory, inflicting heavy casualties on the Babylonians and forcing the Babylonian forces to retreat beyond the Median Wall. Shortly thereafter, on 10 October 539 BC, Sippar was taken by Cyrus without a fight and Nabonidus retreated to Babylon. Why Sippar surrendered without a fight is not clear. It is possible the authorities at Sippar were disgruntled with Nabonidus's religious policies or else viewed the Babylonian defeat at Opis as so decisive that further resistance was pointless. Evidently there was some confusion at the time given that a tablet from Sippar, dated to 11 October (the day after the city's fall) was still dated to the reign of Nabonidus.

On 12 October, the Persian army, led by the governor Ugbaru, entered Babylon without a fight. The last tablet dated to Nabonidus's reign is from Uruk and is dated to 13 October, which is usually considered the end date of his reign. Shield-bearing Persian troops were assigned to guard the temples of Babylon, so that priests in safety could continue their services and rituals. On 29 or 30 October, Cyrus himself entered Babylon as its new king. He received the acclamation of the people, though whether it was as a liberator from oppression, as Cyrus presented himself, or as a conqueror, is open to interpretation. The end of Nabonidus's reign is sometimes alternatively dated to Babylon's fall to the Persians on 12 October, a day earlier than the last tablet dated to Nabonidus's reign, or to Cyrus's entry into the city, when Cyrus formally became king.

== Fate ==
Ancient accounts differ as to the fate of Nabonidus after the fall of Babylon. The 5th/4th-century BC Greek historian Xenophon wrote that Ugbaru (or 'Gobryas') killed Nabonidus upon the capture of Babylon, but it is possible that Xenophon meant Belshazzar, whose death at the fall of Babylon is also recorded in the Biblical Book of Daniel. Berossus wrote that Nabonidus surrendered to Cyrus at Borsippa after the fall of Babylon who dealt with him "in a gracious manner", sparing his life and allowing him to retire, or possibly appointing him to be a governor, in Carmania (approximately the modern Kerman province in Iran), where Nabonidus lived out the rest of his life. The royal chronicle simply states that Nabonidus was captured in Babylon after retreating, leaving his subsequent fate unclear. The Dynastic Prophecy corroborates Berossus's account, by stating that Nabonidus was removed from his throne and settled "in another land". If Berossus is believed, Nabonidus lived into the reign of Darius the Great (r. 522–486 BC), outliving both Cyrus and Cyrus's son and successor Cambyses II, given that Berossus claims that "King Darius, however, took away a part of his province for himself". Given the age of his mother, Adad-guppi, at the time of her death (she allegedly lived to be 104), it is not impossible that Nabonidus too would have lived for over a century.

The fate of Belshazzar is unknown, given that none of the sources describe what happened to him. It is typically assumed that Belshazzar was killed by the Persians at Babylon when the city fell, on 12 October, though he may alternatively already have been killed at the battle of Opis, captured and executed, or exiled together with his father.

== Family, children and descendants ==
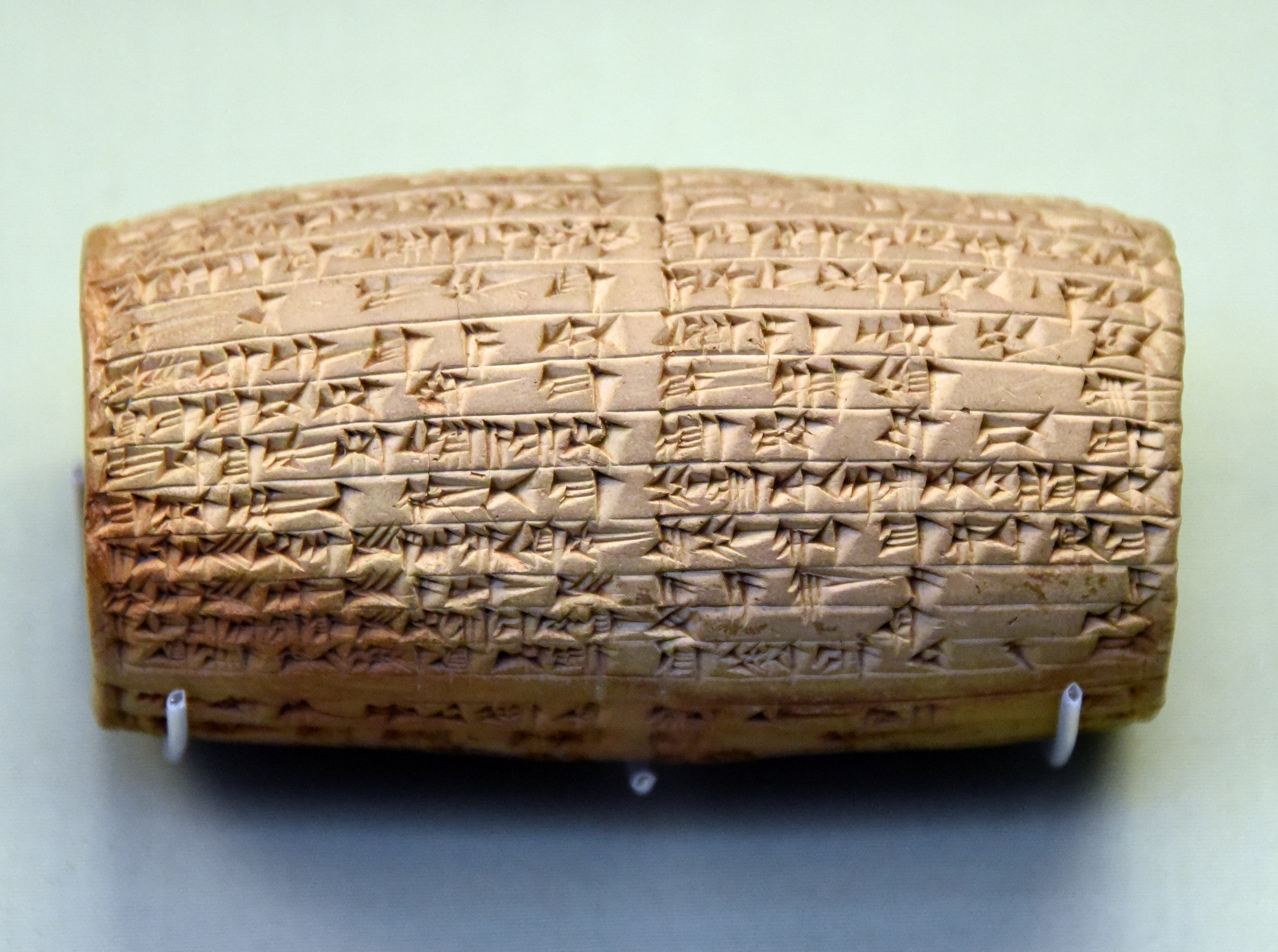
Clay cylinder records the restoration of Sîn's ziggurat at Ur by Nabonidus and also asks Sîn to protect Nabonidus and his son, Belshazzar

Details on Nabonidus's family are scarce. He likely had a large family even prior to becoming king, seeing as his mother Adad-guppi in her inscriptions claims that she had great-great-grandchildren, and Nabonidus was presumably Adad-guppi's only child. Adad-guppi having great-great-grandchildren means that Nabonidus would have had great-grandchildren early in his reign, though the names, lineage, number and genders of these descendants are not mentioned. The known children of Nabonidus are:

- Belshazzar (Akkadian: Bēl-šar-uṣur) – a son. Crown prince throughout Nabonidus's reign and regent 553–543/542 BC.
- Ennigaldi-Nanna (Akkadian: En-nigaldi-Nanna) – a daughter. Consecrated by her father as an entum-priestess in Ur.
- Ina-Esagila-remat or Ina-Esagila-risat (Akkadian: Ina-Esagil-rīšat) – a daughter. Mentioned as the recipient of a tithe at Sippar, otherwise little is known of her.
- Akkabuʾunma (Akkadian: Akkabuʾunma, exact reading uncertain) – a daughter. Recorded in archival texts at Sippar.
- Possibly another daughter recorded in archival texts at Sippar, however, her name is unknown.

Some later Babylonians would lay claim to descent from Nabonidus. Nidintu-Bêl, who rebelled against the Achaemenid king Darius the Great in late 522 BC and was proclaimed as Babylon's king, took the name Nebuchadnezzar III and claimed to be a son of Nabonidus. Nidintu-Bêl's real father was a man named Mukīn-zēri from the local prominent Zazakku family. Less than a year after Nidintu-Bêl's defeat, Babylon rebelled against Darius again in 521 BC. This time, the leader was Arakha, who like Nidintu-Bêl proclaimed himself to be a son of Nabonidus and took the name Nebuchadnezzar IV. Arakha was actually the son of a man by the name of Haldita and was not a native Babylonian, but rather a Urartian (Armenian).

== Legacy ==
=== Character and remembrance ===
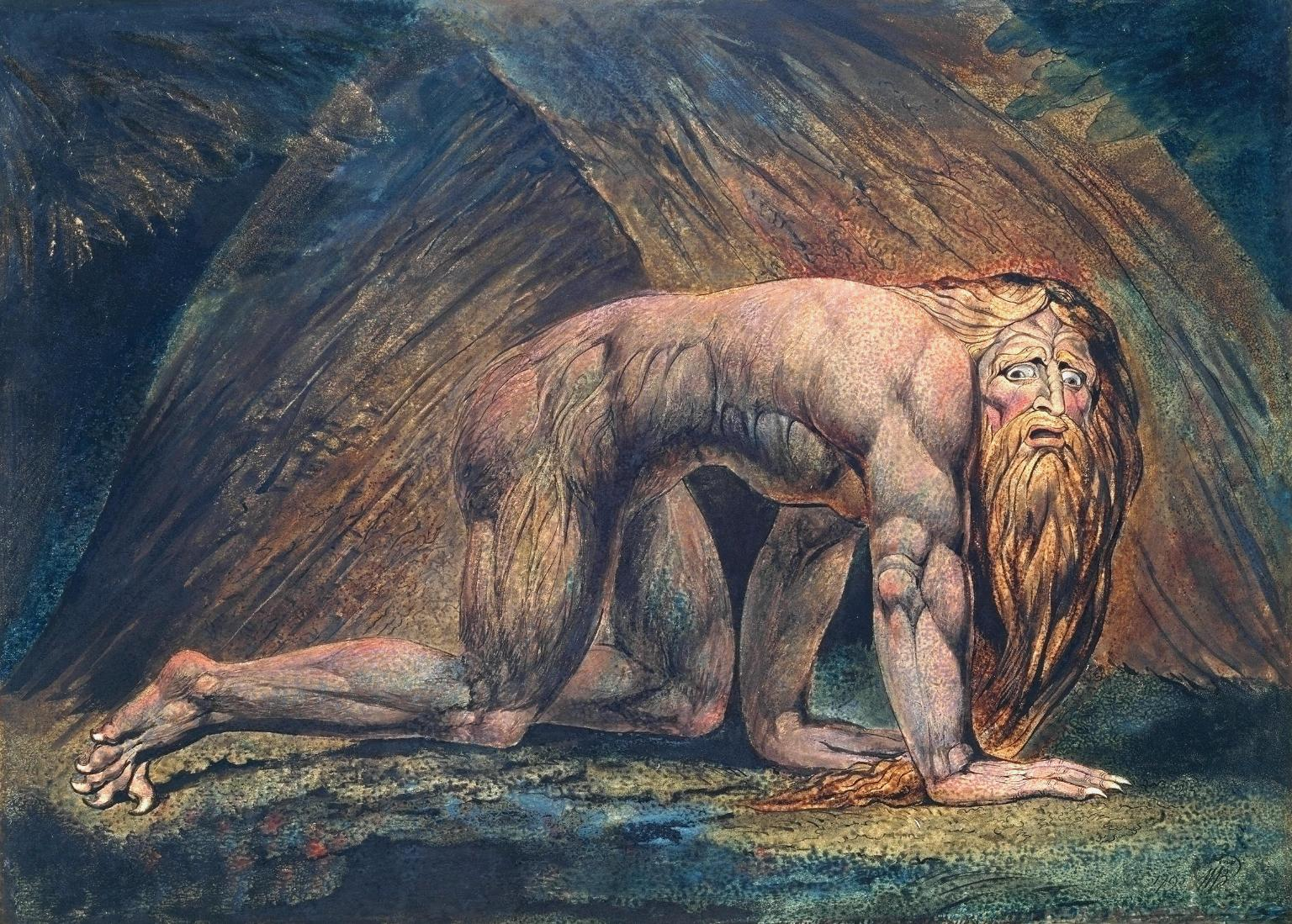
Nebuchadnezzar (1795) by William Blake. The painting depicts Nebuchadnezzar II as nude and mad, living like a wild animal. It has been argued that the story of Nebuchadnezzar II's madness originally referred to Nabonidus.

No other Neo-Babylonian king has been characterised in as varied a manner as Nabonidus. Though some Classical authors forgot, or omitted, details of Nabonidus in their accounts of Babylonia, only preserving him as a name in their lists of kings, the Achaemenid Empire that succeeded the reign of Nabonidus in Babylonia viewed his rule as an example that should never be emulated. The Achaemenids did not consider Nabonidus's more traditional work, restoring temples etc., to be important, but emphasised in their historiography the points when Nabonidus went contrary to what was expected of a Babylonian king. Cyrus the Great justified his conquest of Babylon by presenting himself as a champion divinely ordained by Marduk and by writing accounts of Nabonidus's "heretical" acts.

After the fall of Babylon, a legend of Nabonidus having been mad, on account of his religious policies, gradually formed, which would eventually find its way into Hellenistic and Jewish tradition. Some believe that in the Book of Daniel, Nabonidus's supposed madness is reattributed to Nebuchadnezzar II. The accusation of insanity is not found in any cuneiform sources. The Verse Account is highly critical of Nabonidus, especially his religious policies, and though it presents Cyrus the Great as a liberator rather than conqueror, it makes no direct claim that Nabonidus was insane. The Dynastic Prophecy and the Cyrus Cylinder offer similar accounts, criticising Nabonidus and his policies, but not characterising him as mad. Some Babylonian sources are more neutral. The Babylonian Chronicle, a more objective account of Babylonian history, records the king as being absent from Babylon for years on end, and the resulting suspension of the New Year's festival, but does not pass any judgement on these events. In his history of Babylonia, Berossus presents Nabonidus as a usurper, which Nabonidus himself admitted to being, but reports nothing that could be construed as negative assessment of the king. As such, it is clear that contemporary views of Nabonidus were not completely negative. Had the Babylonians universally dismissed Nabonidus as an incompetent and impious heretic, it is also unlikely that two later Babylonian rebels would have claimed to be his sons. Cuneiform sources suggest that the Babylonians remembered Nabonidus as unorthodox and misguided, but not insane.

The Aramaic Prayer of Nabonidus, one of the texts found among the Dead Sea Scrolls, written centuries later, contains what might be the origin of the tale of Nabonidus being mad. The prayer claims that Nabonidus was afflicted with a terrible skin disease for seven years, which he was cured of by praying to the god of the Jews. The story is similar to Mesopotamian traditions of kings being cursed by the gods with skin diseases and being forced to wander the arid steppes like wild animals. There is a similar text from the Hellenistic period at Uruk, which ascribes Shulgi (r. c. 2094–2046 BC), a king of the Third Dynasty of Ur, as being cursed with a skin disease after desecrating Marduk and elevating Sîn in his place. It is not unlikely that this legend was then associated with Nabonidus, who had elevated Sîn in Marduk's place, with later Jewish chroniclers associating skin disease with madness, and associating the tale of being condemned to wander the desert like a wild animal with Nabonidus's prolonged stay at Tayma.

Modern historians have characterised Nabonidus in various ways. When more of his inscriptions, combined with literary sources describing him and his time, were uncovered in the first half of the 19th century, Nabonidus came to be described in different eccentric ways. Some characterised him as an old antiquarian uninterested in government affairs, focused solely on archaeological excavations. Others viewed Nabonidus as an evil usurper, whose incompetence resulted in the fall of his ancient empire. Others saw Nabonidus as a religious fanatic, obsessed with making the moon god the supreme deity of his empire. According to Beaulieu, the picture historians have of Nabonidus today is as a clearly able ruler, who tried to save the Neo-Babylonian Empire, a powerful but hastily built and politically unstable realm, from its internal instability and its desperate geopolitical position. Lambert characterised Nabonidus as "the most individualist ruler of his time" on account of his unorthodox religious policies and his prolonged stay in Arabia. Weiershäuser and Novotny wrote that contrary to the overtly negative assessments from the Persian period, Nabonidus was a relatively successful ruler, undertaking many building projects, leading his armies in successful campaigns far away from the Babylonian heartland and ensuring that his empire prospered. Weierhäuser and Novotny considered Nabonidus to be "undoubtedly one of the most vibrant personalities of ancient Mesopotamia".

=== Nabonidus as an archaeologist ===
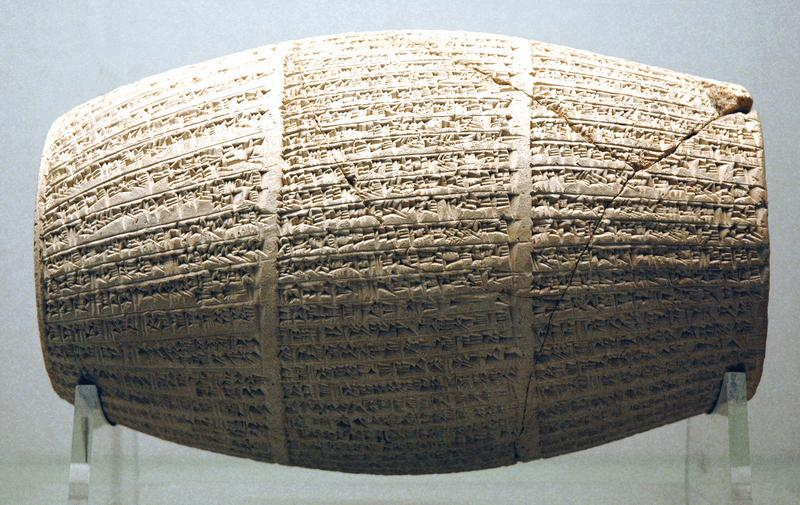
Nabonidus cylinder from Sippar

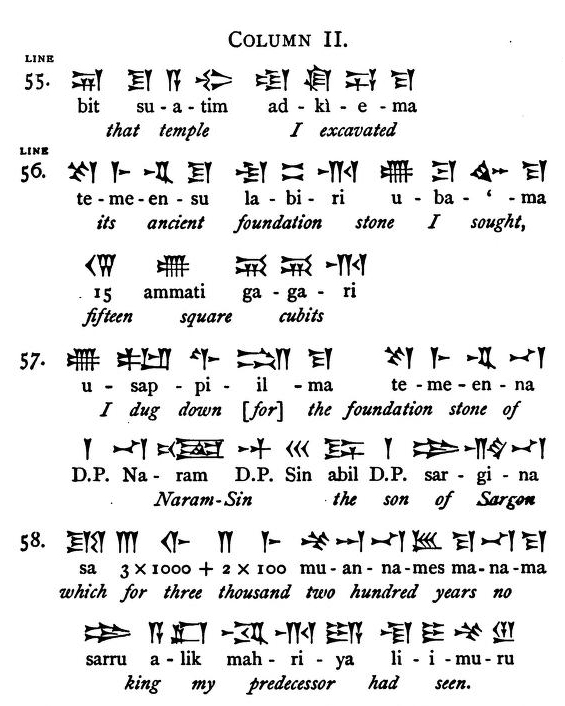
Extract describing the excavation

Cuneiform account by Nabonidus of the excavation of a foundation deposit belonging to Naram-Sin of Akkad

Nabonidus has sometimes been described as the "first archaeologist". Nabonidus conducted excavations founded on the well-established Mesopotamian idea that in order to properly renovate and rebuild a temple, its foundations had to be excavated so that it could be restored in accordance with its original plans. There is evidence that Nabonidus was more of an antiquarian than his predecessors, such as Nabopolassar and Nebuchadnezzar II, who conducted similar excavations during their restoration work on temples.

Nabonidus's activities and his inscriptions suggest a particular interest in history. He notably revived the office of entum-priestess in Ur and consecrated his daughter in that office, and his inscriptions as king also mention previous Babylonian and Assyrian rulers, as far back as Eriba-Marduk (who reigned as king of Babylon in the 8th century BC). Evidence that Nabonidus was more interested in history than his predecessors also exists in that Nabopolassar and Nebuchadnezzar II were often very brief in their descriptions of items found during the excavations of the temples, only briefly mentioning finding the foundation deposits of temples and which king had deposited the stone. Nabonidus on the other hand is more explicit and in three known instances even attempted to date these preceding rulers, placing Shagarakti-Shuriash (r. c. 1245–1233 BC) 800 years before his own reign and Naram-Sin of Akkad (r. c. 2254–2218 BC) 3200 years before his own reign. His attempted dating of Naram-Sin's reign, based on what was found during the excavation of a temple built by the king, is the earliest known dating of an archaeological artifact, and though Nabonidus's proposed date is off by about 1,500 years, it was still a very good estimate considering the lack of accurate dating technology. In his inscriptions, Nabonidus is also the only Neo-Babylonian king to speculate on why the temples he restored had fallen into disrepair in the first place, such as explaining how the sack of Harran by the Medes had damaged the temples in the city.

When rebuilding the Ebabbar temple in Sippar, Nabonidus discovered a statue of Sargon of Akkad (r. c. 2334–2279 BC). Nabonidus restored the damaged statue because of his "reverence of the gods" and his "respect for kingship". The reasoning for restoring the statue is thus not only attributed to religious factors, but also to an interest in Sargon as a king, and respect for the Akkadian Empire, the first imperial power of ancient Mesopotamia. Following the discovery of the statue, Nabonidus appears to have conducted other work that suggests an interest in the Akkadian Empire, such as restoring the temple dedicated to Ishtar at Akkad, as well as an excavation of Naram-Sin's palace in Akkad. These excavations, though mostly beginning as restorations of religious buildings, also uncovered archaeological artefacts that were used for political, as well as scholarly, purposes. In contrast to preceding Neo-Babylonian kings, who had been largely silent about Assyria, Nabonidus clearly positioned himself and the Babylonian kings as the successors to the Assyrian kings, calling them his "royal ancestors", who had ruled as universal monarchs throughout the Near East. Association with the Akkadian kings through excavations might thus have been partially politically motivated, linking the Neo-Babylonian Empire not only to the Neo-Assyrian Empire, but also to the old Akkadian Empire.

== Titles ==
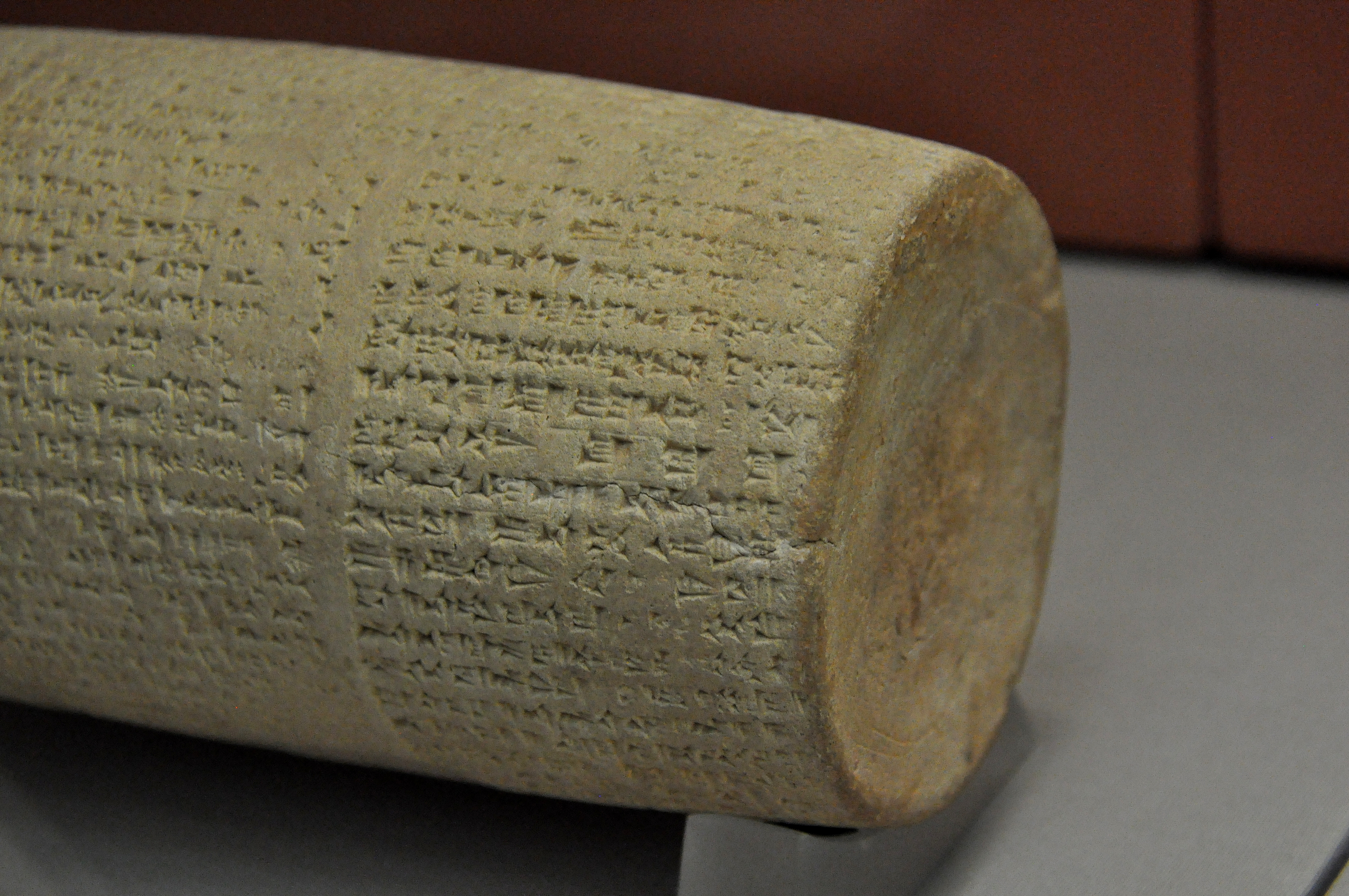
Terracotta cylinder of Nabonidus, recording the restoration work on the temple of Shamash at Larsa

In two of his known inscriptions, Nabonidus assumes the traditional titulary of the old Neo-Assyrian kings (though omitting the title 'king of Assyria'), (Note: Some non-contemporary sources ascribe the title 'king of Assyria' to Nabonidus as well. The 'Prayer of Nabonidus', one of the Aramaic texts within the Dead Sea Scrolls, refers to Nabonidus as "Nabonidus, king of Assyria and Babylon, the great king".) in sharp contrast to the otherwise typically modest titularies of the Neo-Babylonian kings. His titulary, as used in an inscription intended for Harran (i.e. within former Assyria), after the rebuilding of the Eḫulḫul, Nabonidus used the following titles:

I am Nabonidus, the great king, the strong king, king of the Universe, king of Babylon, king of the Four Quarters, the restorer of Esagila and Ezida, whose destiny Sîn and Ningal while he was in his mother's womb decreed for the lot of royalty; the son of Nabu-balatsu-iqbi, the wise prince, the reverer of the great gods, am I.

The use of typical Assyrian titles such as 'king of the Universe' and 'king of the Four Quarters', as well as the epithets 'strong king' and 'great king', might derive from inscriptions by Assyrian kings being discovered at Harran during the building work at the Eḫulḫul, and Nabonidus assuming those titles as part of his claim to the heritage of the Neo-Assyrian Empire. More noteworthy is the presence of certain Assyrian titles in some inscriptions intended for Babylonia proper. The title 'king of the Universe' was for instance incorporated into Nabonidus's titles as displayed in an inscription at Ur:

Nabonidus, king of the Universe, king of Babylon, who (re)built the Enunmaḫ, the bīt ḫilṣi, in the midst of the Egišnugal, for Ningal his lady.

There are also more standard Babylonian examples of Nabonidus's title, prior to the rebuilding of the Eḫulḫul, without Assyrian elements:

Nabonidus, king of Babylon, the restorer of Esagila and Ezida, the performer of pious deeds, the son of Nabu-balatsu-iqbi, the perfect prince, am I.

A longer variant, from an inscription describing renovation work on Babylon's walls, reads:

Nabonidus, king of Babylon, attentive prince, the shepherd who provides, the one who is constantly attentive to the will of the gods, the wise (and) pious one, the one who constantly seeks out the shrines of the great gods, most befitting warrior, creation of the sage of the gods — the god Marduk — product of the goddess Erua — creator of all rulers — selected by the god Nabû — the heir of Esagil who controls (cosmic) harmony — creation of the god Ninšiku — the (all-)knowing creator of everything — chosen by the god Nannāru — the lord of the crown who makes astrological signs known — the one who strives every day (to show) devotion to the great gods (and) whose mind is focused on provisioning Esagil and Ezida, son of Nabû-balāssu-iqbi, wise prince, am I.

== Notes ==
Nabonidus Non-dynastic / Chaldean dynasty Born: c. 620–615 BC Died: after 522 BC (?)
Preceded by Labashi-Marduk	King of Babylon; 556–539 BC	Succeeded by Persian conquest
