= Cylinders of Nabonidus =

Cuneiform inscriptions by King Nabonidus

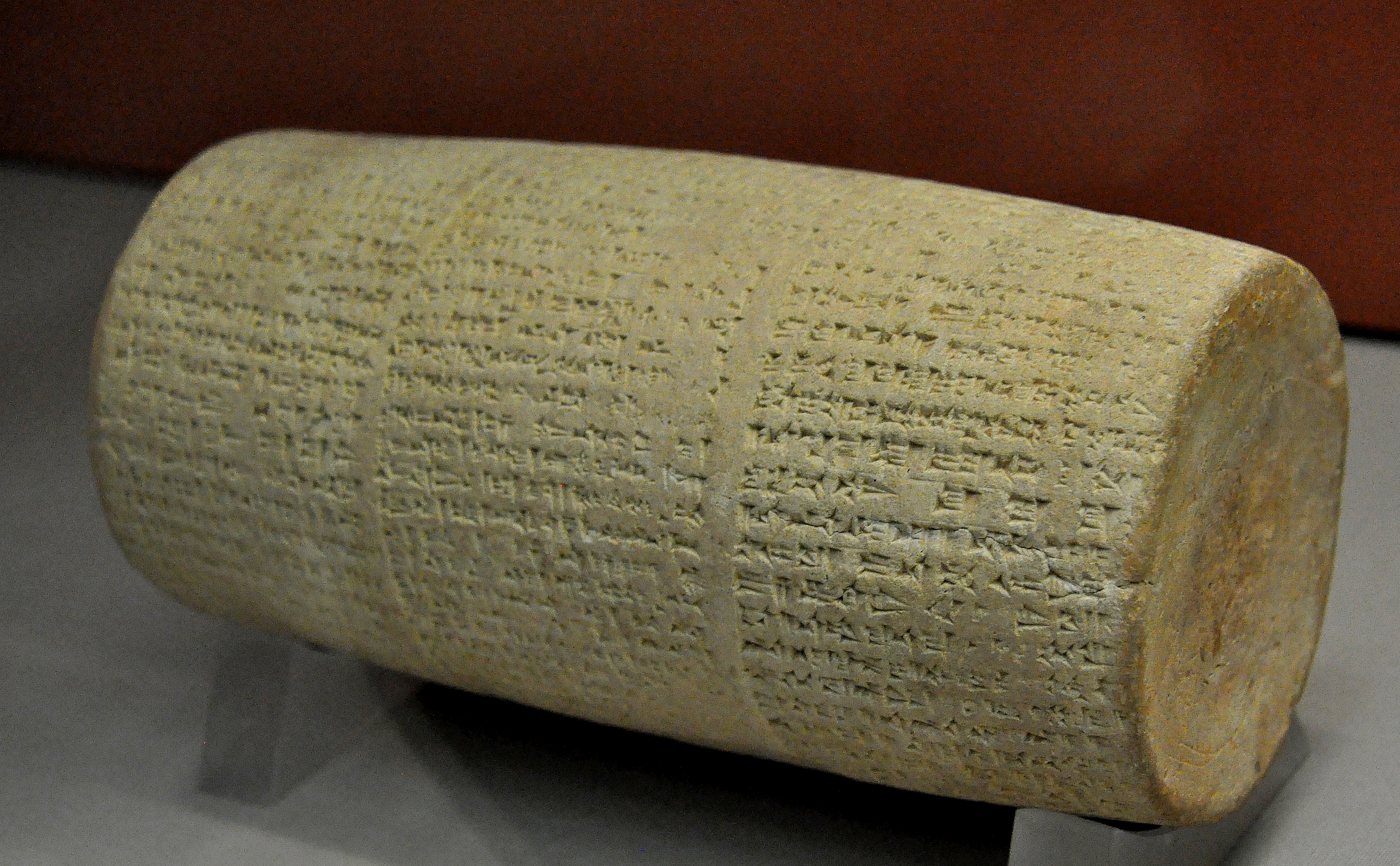
- Cylinder of Nabonidus from the temple of Shamash at Larsa, Mesopotamia.
- Material: Fired clay
- Size: 22.86 cm high and 9.2 cm diameter
- Created: 555–540 BC
- Present location: British Museum, London, England
- Registration: 1882,0714.1025

The Cylinders of Nabonidus refers to cuneiform inscriptions of king Nabonidus of Babylonia (556–539 BC). These inscriptions were made on clay cylinders. They include the Nabonidus Cylinder from Sippar, and the Nabonidus Cylinders from Ur, four in number.

== Description ==
The Nabonidus Cylinder from Sippar is a long text in which Nabonidus describes how he repaired three temples: the sanctuary of the moon god Sin in Harran, the sanctuary of the warrior goddess Anunitu in Sippar, and the temple of Šamaš in Sippar.

The Nabonidus Cylinders from Ur contain the foundation text of a ziggurat called E-lugal-galga-sisa, which belonged to the temple of Sin in Ur. Nabonidus describes how he repaired the structure. It is probably the king's last building inscription and may be dated to ca. 540 BC. The text is interesting because it offers a full syncretism of Sin, Marduk, and Nabu.

Nabonidus cylinders from Ur are also noteworthy because they mention a son named Belshazzar, who is mentioned in the Book of Daniel. The cylinders state:

"As for me, Nabonidus, king of Babylon, save me from sinning against your great godhead and grant me as a present a life long of days, and as for Belshazzar, the eldest son -my offspring- instill reverence for your great godhead in his heart and may he not commit any cultic mistake, may he be sated with a life of plenitude."

== Excavation ==
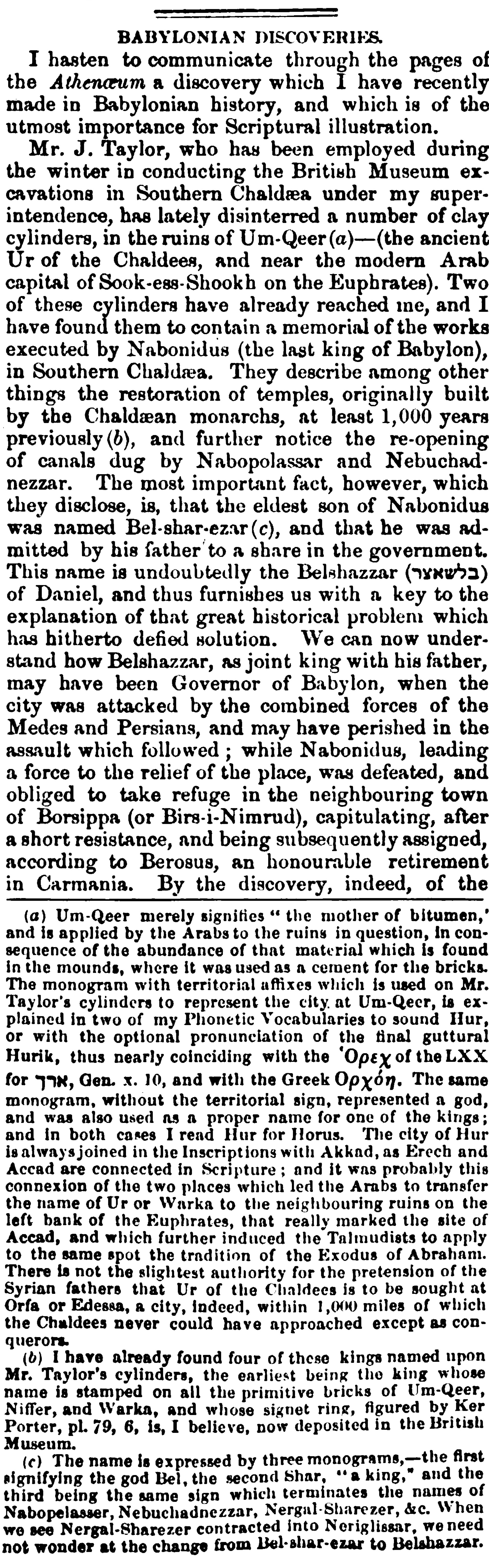
Rawlinson's March 1854 letter to The Athenaeum announcing his reading of the Nabonidus cylinders which connected Muqeyer or "Um Qeer" with Ur of the Chaldees

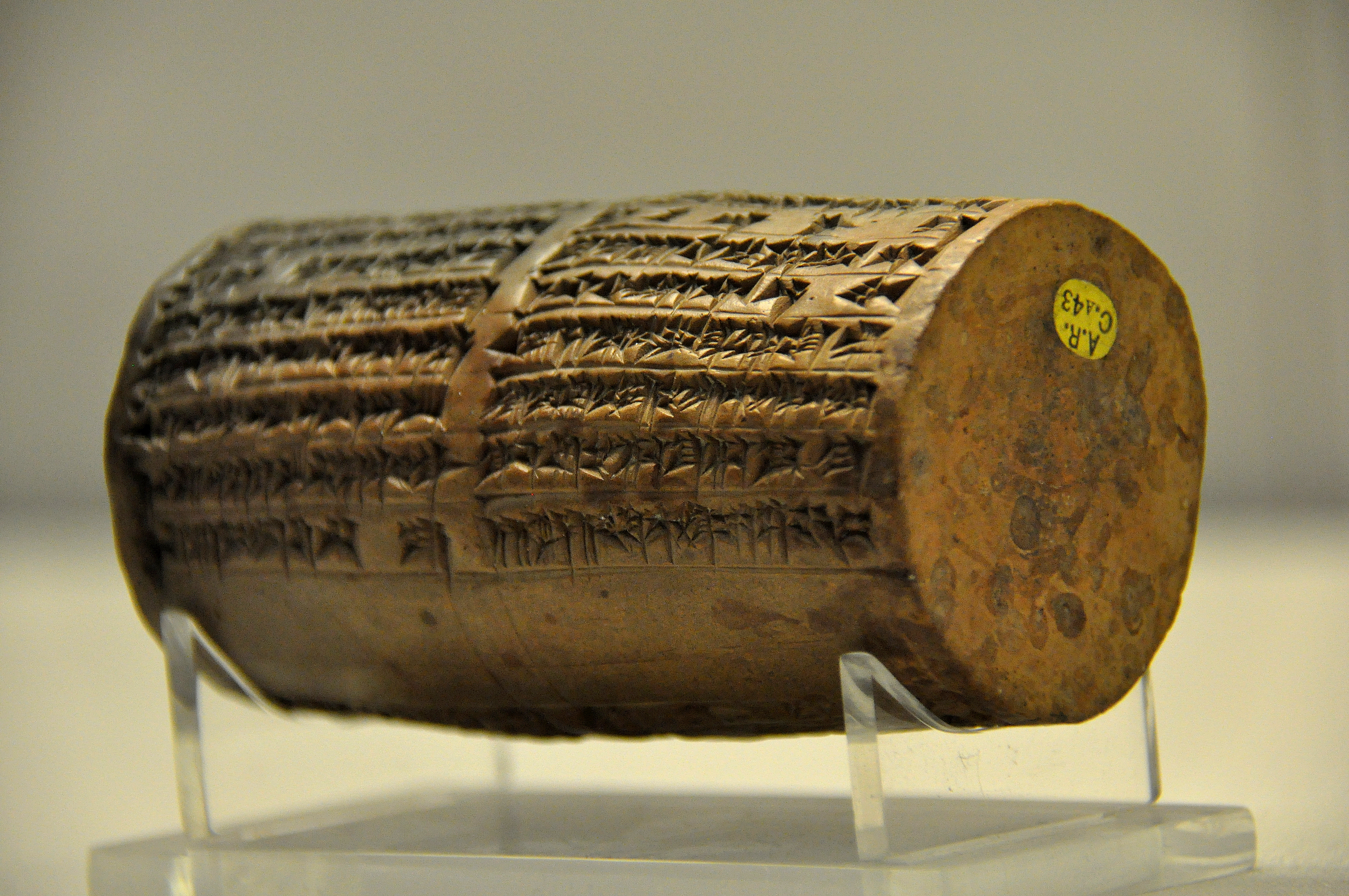
Cylinder of Nabonidus from the temple of God Sin at UR, Mesopotamia. .

In 1854, J.G. Taylor found four cuneiform cylinders in the foundation of a ziggurat at Ur. These were deposited by Nabonidus; all four apparently have an identical inscription.

In 1881, Assyriologist Hormuzd Rassam made an important find at Sippar in Babylonia (now called Abu Habba), where he discovered the temple of the sun. There he also found a clay cylinder of Nabonidus. This cylinder, excavated in the royal palace, is now in the Pergamon Museum in Berlin. A copy is in the British Museum in London. The text was written after Nabonidus' return from Arabia in his thirteenth regnal year, but before war broke out with the Persian king Cyrus the Great, who is mentioned as an instrument of the gods.

The Nabonidus Cylinder from Sippar contains echoes from earlier foundation texts, and develops the same themes as later ones, like the better-known Cyrus Cylinder: a lengthy titulary, a story about an angry god who has abandoned his shrine, who is reconciled with his people, orders a king to restore the temple, and a king who piously increases the daily offerings. Prayers are also included.

== Translation of the Sippar cylinder ==
The translation of the Nabonidus Cylinder of Sippar was made by Paul-Alain Beaulieu, author of, "The Reign of Nabonidus, King of Babylon 556-539 B.C."

[i.1–7] I, Nabonidus, the great king, the strong king, the king of the universe, the king of Babylon, the king of the four corners, the caretaker of Esagila and Ezida, for whom Sin and Ningal in his mother's womb decreed a royal fate as his destiny, the son of Nabû-balâssi-iqbi, the wise prince, the worshiper of the great gods, I:

Cylinder of Nabodinus from Sippar

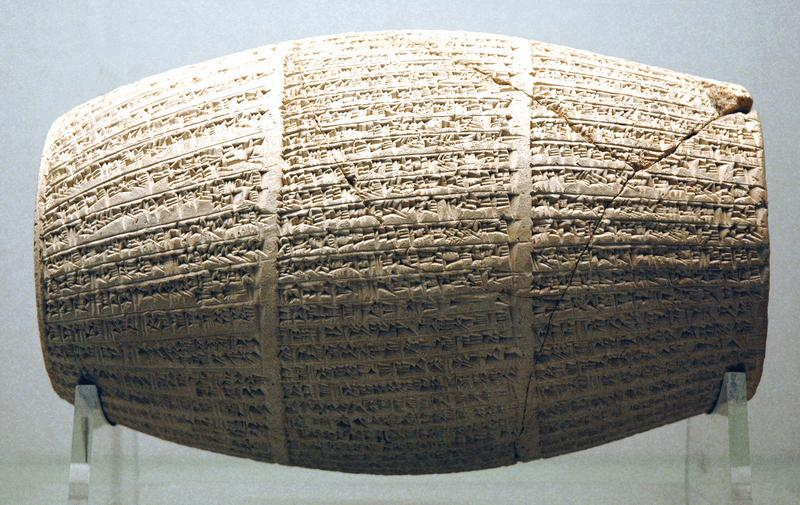
The Nabonidus Cylinder of Sippar on display in the British Museum

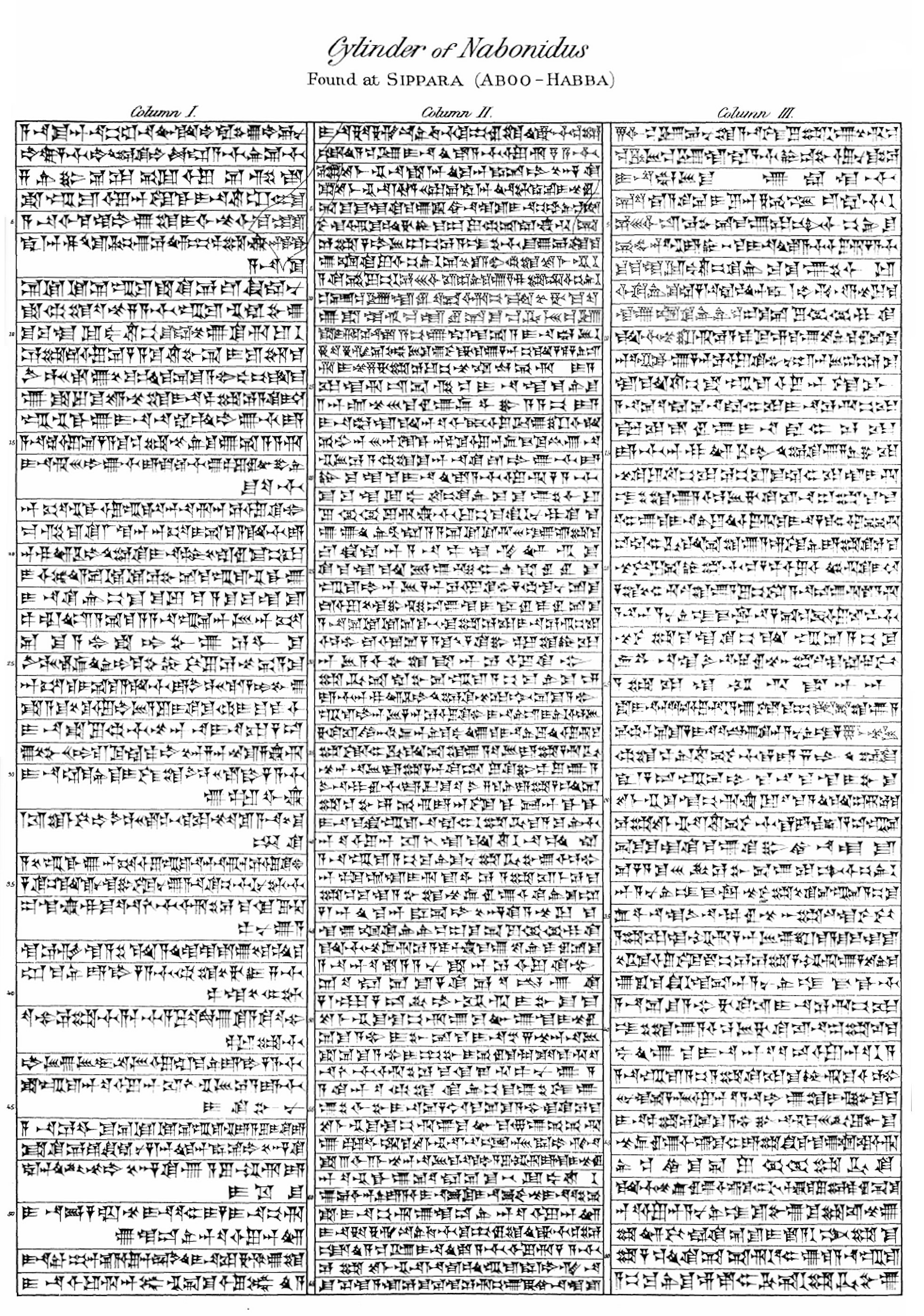
The Nabonidus cylinder from Sippar, mentioning the expedition of Cyrus against Astyages, the finding of the cylinder of Naram-Sin, son of Sargon, the finding of the cylinder of Sagasalti-Burias son of Kudirri-Bel.

[i.8-ii.25] Ehulhul, the temple of Sin in Harran, where since days of yore Sin, the great lord, had established his favorite residence – his great heart became angry against that city and temple and he aroused the Mede, destroyed the temple and turned it into ruin – in my legitimate reign Bel (Note: Bel was a Babylonian derivative of Baal.) and the great lord,[1] for the love of my kingship, became reconciled with that city and temple and showed compassion.

In the beginning of my everlasting reign they sent me a dream. Marduk, the great lord, and Sin, the luminary of heaven and the netherworld, stood together. Marduk spoke with me: 'Nabonidus, king of Babylon, carry bricks on your riding horse, rebuild Ehulhul and cause Sin, the great lord, to establish his residence in its midst.'

Reverently, I spoke to the Enlil of the gods, Marduk: 'That temple which you ordered me to build, the Mede surrounds it and his might is excessive.'

But Marduk spoke with me: 'The Mede whom you mentioned, he, his country and the kings who march at his side will be no more.'

At the beginning of the third year [Summer 553], they aroused him, Cyrus, the king of Anšan, his second in rank.[2] He scattered the vast Median hordes with his small army. He captured Astyages, the king of the Medes, and took him to his country as captive. Such was the word of the great lord Marduk and of Sin, the luminary of heaven and the netherworld, whose command is not revoked. I feared their august command, I became troubled, I was worried and my face showed signs of anxiety. I was not neglectful, nor remiss, nor careless.

For rebuilding Ehulhul, the temple of Sin, my lords, who marches at my side, which is in Harran, which Aššurbanipal, king of Assyria, son of Esarhaddon, a prince who preceded me, had rebuilt, I mustered my numerous troops, from the country of Gaza on the border of Egypt, near the Upper Sea [the Mediterranean] on the other side of the Euphrates, to the Lower Sea [the Persian Gulf], the kings, princes, governors and my numerous troops which Sin, Šamaš and Ištar -my lords- had entrusted to me. And in a propitious month, on an auspicious day, which Šamaš and Adad revealed to me by means of divination, by the wisdom of Ea and Asalluhi, with the craft of the exorcist, according to the art of Kulla, the lord of foundations and brickwork, upon beads of silver and gold, choice gems, logs of resinous woods, aromatic herbs and cuts of cedar wood, in joy and gladness, on the foundation deposit of Aššurbanipal, king of Assyria, who had found the foundation of Šalmaneser [III], the son of Aššurnasirpal [II], I cleared its foundations and laid its brickwork.

I mixed its mortar with beer, wine, oil and honey and anointed its excavation ramps with it. More than the kings -my fathers- had done, I strengthened its building and perfected its work. That temple from its foundation to its parapet I built anew and I completed its work. Beams of lofty cedar trees, a product of Lebanon, I set above it. Doors of cedar wood, whose scent is pleasing, I affixed at its gates. With gold and silver glaze I coated its wall and made it shine like the sun. I set up in its chapel a 'wild bull' of shining silver alloy, fiercely attacking my foes. At the Gate of Sunrise I set up two 'long haired heroes' coated with silver, destroyers of enemies, one to the left, one to the right. I led Sin, Ningal, Nusku, and Sadarnunna -my lords- in procession from Babylon, my royal city, and in joy and gladness I caused them to dwell in its midst, a dwelling of enjoyment. I performed in their presence a pure sacrifice of glorification, presented my gifts, and filled Ehulhul with the finest products, and I made the city of Harran, in its totality, as brilliant as moonlight.

[ii.26-43a] O Sin, king of the gods of heaven and the netherworld, without whom no city or country can be founded, nor be restored, when you enter Ehulhul, the dwelling of your plenitude, may good recommendations for that city and that temple be set on your lips. May the gods who dwell in heaven and the netherworld constantly praise the temple of Sin, the father, their creator. As for me, Nabonidus king of Babylon, who completed that temple, may Sin, the king of the gods of heaven and the netherworld, joyfully cast his favorable look upon me and every month, in rising and setting, make my ominous signs favorable. May he lengthen my days, extend my years, make my reign firm, conquer my enemies, annihilate those hostile to me, destroy my foes. May Ningal, the mother of the great gods, speak favorably before Sin, her beloved, on my behalf. May Šamaš and Ištar, his shining offspring, recommend me favorably to Sin, the father, their creator. May Nusku, the august vizier, hear my prayer and intercede for me.

[ii.43b-46] The inscription written in the name of Aššurbanipal, king of Assyria, I found and did not alter. I anointed it with oil, performed a sacrifice, placed it with my own inscription, and returned it to its place.

[ii.47-iii.7] For Šamaš, the judge of heaven and the netherworld, concerning Ebabbar ['shining house'], his temple which is in Sippar, which Nebuchadnezzar, a former king had rebuilt and whose old foundation deposit he had looked for but not found -yet he rebuilt that temple and after forty-five years the walls of that temple had sagged- I became troubled, I became fearful, I was worried and my face showed signs of anxiety.

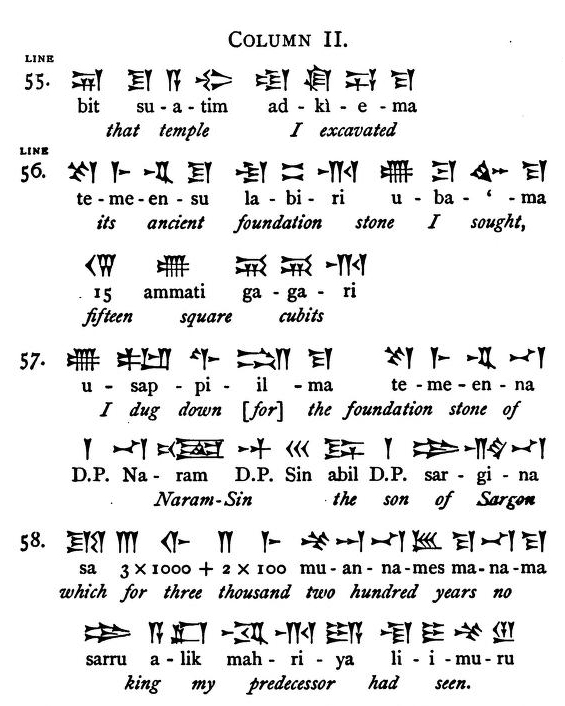
Nabonidus cylinder from Sippar: extract about Naram-Sin and Sargon

While I led Šamaš out of its midst and caused him to dwell in another sanctuary, I removed the debris of that temple, looked for its old foundation deposit, dug to a depth of eighteen cubits into the ground and then Šamaš, the great lord, revealed to me the original foundations of Ebabbar, the temple which is his favorite dwelling, by disclosing the foundation deposit of Naram-Sin, son of Sargon, which no king among my predecessors had found in three thousand and two hundred years.[3]

In the month Tašrîtu, in a propitious month, on an auspicious day, which Šamaš and Adad had revealed to me by means of divination, upon beds of silver and gold, choice gems, logs of resinous woods, aromatic herbs, and cuts of cedar wood, in joy and gladness, on the foundation deposit of Naram-Sin, son of Sargon, not a finger's breadth too wide or too narrow, I laid its brick work. Five thousand massive beams of cedar wood I set up for its roofing. Lofty doors of cedar wood, thresholds and pivots I affixed at its gates. Ebabbar, together with E-kun-ankuga ['pure stairway to heaven'], its ziggurat, I built anew and completed its work. I led Šamaš, my lord, in procession and, in joy and gladness, I caused him to dwell in the midst of his favorite dwelling.

[iii.8–10] The inscription in the name of Naram-Sin, son of Sargon, I found and did not alter. I anointed it with oil, made offerings, placed it with my own inscription and returned it to its original place.

[iii.11–21] O Šamaš, great lord of heaven and the netherworld, light of the gods -your fathers- offspring of Sin and Ningal, when you enter Ebabbar your beloved temple, when you take up residence in your eternal dais, look joyfully upon me, Nabonidus, king of Babylon, the prince your caretaker, the one who pleases you and built your august chapel, and upon my good deeds, and every day at sunrise and sunset, in the heavens and on the earth, make my omens favorable, accept my supplications and receive my prayers. With the scepter and the legitimate staff which placed in my hands may I rule forever.

[iii.22–38] For Anunitu -the lady of warfare, who carries the bow and the quiver, who fulfills the command of Enlil her father, who annihilates the enemy, who destroys the evil one, who precedes the gods, who, at sunrise and sunset, causes my ominous signs to be favorable- I excavated, surveyed and inspected the old foundations of Eulmaš, her temple which is in Sippar-Anunitu, which for eight hundred years,[4] since the time of Šagarakti-Šuriaš, king of Babylon, son of Kudur-Enlil, and on the foundation deposit of Šagarakti-Šuriaš, son of Kudur Enlil, I cleared its foundations and laid its brickwork. I built that temple anew and completed its work. Anunitu, the lady of warfare, who fulfills the command of Enlil her father, who annihilates the enemy, who destroys the evil one, who precedes the gods, I caused her to establish her residence. The regular offerings and the other offerings I increased over what they were and I established for her.

[iii.38–42] As for you, O Anunitu, great lady, when you joyfully enter that temple, look joyfully upon my good deeds and every month, at sunrise and sunset, petition Sin, your father, your begetter, for favors on my behalf.

[iii.43–51] Whoever you are whom Sin and Šamaš will call to kingship, and in whose reign that temple will fall into disrepair and who build it anew, may he find the inscription written in my name and not alter it. May he anoint it with oil, perform a sacrifice, place it with the inscription written in his own name and return it to its original place. May Šamaš and Anunitu hear his supplication, receive his utterance, march at his side, annihilate his enemy and daily speak good recommendations on his behalf to Sin, the father, their creator.

== Verse account of Nabonidus ==
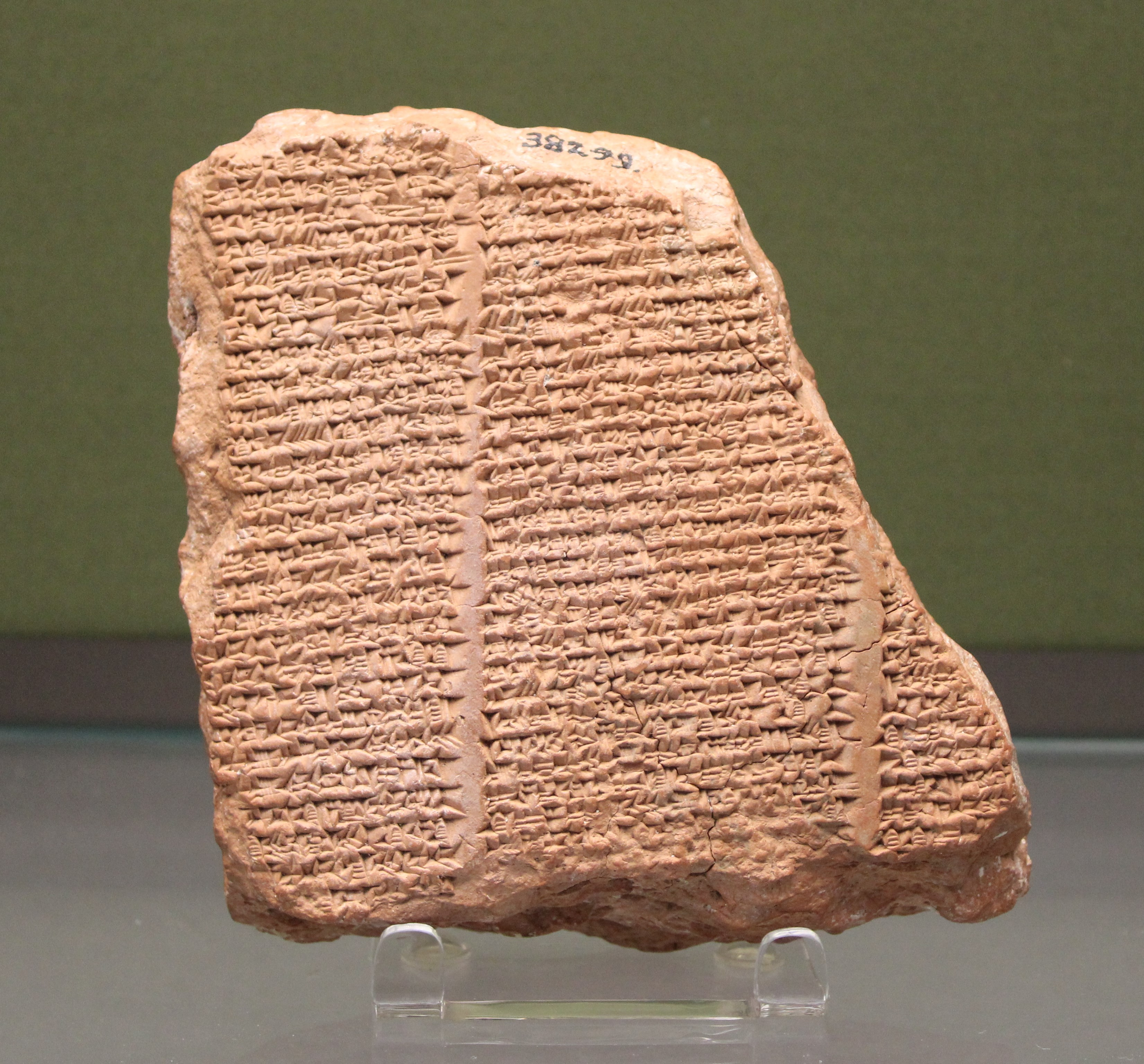
Verse Account of Nabonidus.

The following is a text known as the Verse account of Nabonidus (ME 38299). It was probably written during the reign of Cyrus the Great. William F. Albright called this the "Panegyric of Cyrus".

The translation was made by A. Leo Oppenheim and is copied from James B. Pritchard's Ancient Near Eastern Texts Relating to the Old Testament, 1950 Princeton. Some minor changes have been made.

[As to Nabonidus:] law and order are not promulgated by him, he made perish the common people through want, the nobles he killed in war, for the trader he blocked the road. For the farmer he made rare the [unintelligible], there is no [lacuna], the harvester does not sing the alalu-song any more, he does not fence in any more the arable territory. [lacuna] He took away their property, scattered their possessions, the [lacuna] he ruined completely, their corpses remaining on a dark place, decaying. Their faces became hostile, they do not parade along the wide street, you do not see happiness anymore, [lacuna] is unpleasant, they decided. As to Nabonidus, his protective deity became hostile to him. And he, the former favorite of the gods is now seized by misfortunes. Against the will of the gods he performed an unholy action, he thought out something worthless: he had made the image of a deity which nobody had ever seen in this country, he introduced it into the temple, he placed it on a pedestal; he called it by the name of Moon. It is adorned with a necklace of lapis lazuli, crowned with a tiara, its appearance is that of the eclipsed moon, the gesture of its hand is like that of the god Lugal-[unintelligible], its head of hair reaches to the pedestal, and in front of it are placed the Storm Dragon and the Wild Bull. When he worshipped it, its appearance became like that of a demon crowned with a tiara, his face turned hostile [lacuna]. His form not even Eamummu could have formed, not even the learned Adapa knows his name. Nabonidus said: 'I shall build a temple for him, I shall construct his holy seat, I shall form its first brick for him, I shall establish firmly its foundation, I shall make a replica even of the temple Ekur. I shall call its name Ehulhul for all days to come. When I will have fully executed what I have planned, I shall lead him by the hand and establish him on his seat. Yet till I have achieved this, till I have obtained what is my desire, I shall omit all festivals, I shall order even the New Year's festival to cease!' And he formed its first brick, did lay out the outlines, he spread out the foundation, made high its summit, by means of wall decoration made of gypsum and bitumen he made its facing brilliant, as in the temple Esagila he made a ferocious wild bull stand on guard in front of it. After he had obtained what he desired, a work of utter deceit, had built this abomination, a work of unholiness -when the third year was about to begin- he entrusted the army [?] to his oldest son, his first born, the troops in the country he ordered under his command. He let everything go, entrusted the kingship to him, and, himself, he started out for a long journey. The military forces of Akkad marching with him, he turned to Temâ deep in the west. He started out the expedition on a path leading to a distant region. When he arrived there, he killed in battle the prince of Temâ, slaughtered the flocks of those who dwell in the city as well as in the countryside. And he, himself, took residence in Temâ, the forces of Akkad were also stationed there. He made the town beautiful, built there a palace like the palace in Babylon. He also built walls for the fortification of the town and he surrounded the town with sentinels. The inhabitants became troubled. The brick form and the brick basket he imposed upon them. Through the hard work they [lacuna] he killed the inhabitants, women and youngsters included. Their prosperity he brought to an end. All the barley that he found therein [lacuna] His tired army [lacuna] the hazanu-official of Cyrus...

[About one third of the text is missing. In the lacuna, words like 'stylus' and 'the king is mad' can be discerned; the sequel suggests that a Persian official made an insulting remark on Nabonidus' incapacity to write with a stylus, that war broke out, that Nabonidus had some kind of hallucinatory vision, boasted a victory over Cyrus that he actually had not won, and was ultimately defeated. The texts continues with a comparison of the pious Cyrus and the blasphemous liar Nabonidus.]

... the praise of the Lord of Lords and the names of the countries which Cyrus has not conquered he wrote upon this stele, while Cyrus is the king of the world whose triumphs are true and whose yoke the kings of all the countries are pulling. Nabonidus has written upon his stone tablets: 'I have made him bow to my feet, I personally have conquered his countries, his possessions I took to my residence.'

It was he who once stood up in the assembly to praise himself, saying: 'I am wise, I know, I have seen what is hidden. Even if I do not know how to write with the stylus, yet I have seen secret things. The god Ilte'ri has made me see a vision, he has shown me everything. I am aware of a wisdom which greatly surpasses even that of the series of insights which Adapa has composed!'

Yet he continues to mix up the rites, he confuses the hepatoscopic oracles. To the most important ritual observances, he orders an end; as to the sacred representations in Esagila -representations which Eamumma himself had fashioned- he looks at the representations and utters blasphemies.

When he saw the usar-symbol of Esagila, he makes an [insulting?] gesture. He assembled the priestly scholars, he expounded to them as follows: 'Is not this the sign of ownership indicating for whom the temple was built? If it belongs really to Bêl, it would have been marked with the spade. Therefore the Moon himself has marked already his own temple with the usar-symbol!'

And Zeriya, the šatammu who used to crouch as his secretary in front of him, and Rimut, the bookkeeper who used to have his court position near to him, do confirm the royal dictum, stand by his words, they even bare their heads to pronounce under oath: 'Now only we understand this situation, after the king has explained about it!'

In the month of Nisannu, the eleventh day, till the god was present on his seat [lacuna]

[lacuna] for the inhabitants of Babylon, Cyrus declared the state of peace. His troops he kept away from Ekur. Big cattle he slaughtered with the ax, he slaughtered many aslu-sheep, incense he put on the censer, the regular offerings for the Lord of Lords he ordered increased, he constantly prayed to the gods, prostrated on his face. To act righteously is dear to his heart.

To repair the city of Babylon he conceived the idea and he himself took up hoe, spade and water basket and began to complete the wall of Babylon. The original plan of Nebuchadnezzar the inhabitants executed with a willing heart. He built the fortifications on the Imgur-Enlil-wall.

The images of the gods of Babylon, male and female, he returned to their cellas, the gods who had abandoned their chapels he returned to their mansions. Their wrath he appeased, their mind he put at rest, those whose power was at a low he brought back to life because their food is served to them regularly.

Nabonidus' deeds Cyrus effaced and everything Nabonidus constructed, all the sanctuaries of his royal rule Cyrus has eradicated, the ashes of the burned buildings the wind carried away.

Nabonidus' picture he effaced, in all the sanctuaries the inscriptions of that name are erased. Whatever Nabonidus had created, Cyrus fed to the flames!

To the inhabitants of Babylon a joyful heart is now given. They are like prisoners when the prisons are opened. Liberty is restored to those who were surrounded by oppression. All rejoice to look upon him as king

== See also ==
- Nabonidus Chronicle
- List of artifacts significant to the Bible
