= Adad-guppi =

Assyrian priestess of the moon god Sin

Adad-guppi /ˈædəˌɡɒpi/ (Neo-Babylonian Akkadian: 𒊩𒀭𒅎𒄖𒌒𒉿𒀪, romanized: Adad-gûppîʾ; c. 648-544 BC), also known as Addagoppe, was a devotee of the moon god Sîn in the northern Assyrian city of Harran, and the mother of King Nabonidus (ruled 556–539 BC) of the Neo-Babylonian Empire.

== Life ==
=== Background ===
In her inscriptions, Adad-guppi claimed that Nabonidus was of the dynastic line of Ashurbanipal (r. 669–631 BC), king of the Neo-Assyrian Empire. According to her inscriptions, Adad-guppi was born in Ashurbanipal's twentieth year as king. At the time of her birth, Harran had been a major Assyrian stronghold and when the Neo-Assyrian Empire fell in 609 BC, Harran was the capital of its government in exile.

On account of her claims in regards to Nabonidus being of Sargonid (Ashurbanipal's dynasty) ancestry, Stephanie Dalley considered it in 2003 "almost certain" that Adad-guppi was a daughter of Ashurbanipal.

Michael B. Dick opposed Dalley's conviction in 2004, pointing out that even though Nabonidus did go to some length to revive some old Assyrian symbols (such as wearing a wrapped cloak in his depictions, absent in those of other Neo-Babylonian kings but present in Assyrian art) and attempted to link himself to the Sargonid dynasty, there is "no evidence whatsoever that Nabonidus was related to the Sargonid dynasty".

According to Paul-Alain Beaulieu, that Adad-guppi did not explicitly claim any royal ancestors herself points to a humble origin. As inscriptions by female relatives of kings are relatively rare, it is however probable, according to Wilfred G. Lambert, that Adad-guppi was of some high status.

=== Influence ===
Addagoppe's prediction that Sin would make her son king so that he could restore Harran seems to have been a major influence on Nabonidus, to the cost of his relationship with the priests of Babylon and their traditional gods, particularly Marduk. Other sources beyond Addagoppe's biography reveal that Nabonidus paid homage to Sîn during his reign as king of Babylon. He gave special attention to the temples of Sîn in Harran and Ur, and even considered turning the temple of Marduk in Babylon into a sanctuary for Sîn. This, says one inscription, caused unrest in many parts of the kingdom.

== Autobiography ==
=== Discovery ===
Historians have discovered two copies of a pseudo-autobiography of Addagoppe. The first copy, discovered by H. Pognon in 1906, was written on a broken stele excavated at Harran. The second copy, uncovered fifty years later by D.S. Rice, was written on the pavement steps of the northern entrance to the Great Mosque at Harran.

=== Content ===
The pseudo-autobiography starts out with a first-person account written from the perspective of Addagoppe herself and ends with a description of her burial. Because Addagoppe was buried with the honors of a queen, some scholars have suggested that she acted as a regent for Nabonidus when he abandoned Babylon and moved to the oasis of Teima starting in 552 BC. However, this theory is difficult to reconcile with the chronology Addagoppe presents in her autobiography. She mentions that she was born in the twentieth year of Assyrian King Assurbanipal (about 648 BC), and that she cared for the sanctuaries of the moon god Sîn for 95 years. She also mentions that she lived to see her son Nabonidus made king over Babylon, which took place in 556 BC, making her approximately 92 years old at his coronation, and 96 years old at his departure to Teima. She apparently died at the age of 104 (c. 544 BC), having lived with sound body and mind to see descendants to the fourth generation.

Addagoppe credited Nabonidus' call to kingship to the moon god Sîn, and her autobiography contains a prayer of praise and thanksgiving to Sîn. In response to this prayer, Addagoppe apparently received a prophecy from Sîn in a dream regarding future actions of her son as king:

Through you I will bring about the return of the gods [to] the dwelling in Harran, by means of Nabonidus your son. He will construct Ehulhul; he will complete its work. He will complete the city Harran greater than it was before and restore it. He will bring Sîn, Ningal, Nusku, and Sadarnunna in procession back into the Ehulhul.

== Sources ==
- Beaulieu, Paul-Alain (1989). Reign of Nabonidus, King of Babylon (556-539 BC). Yale University Press. doi:10.2307/j.ctt2250wnt. ISBN 9780300043143. JSTOR j.ctt2250wnt. OCLC 20391775.
- Dalley, Stephanie (2003). "The Hanging Gardens of Babylon?". Herodotus and His World: Essays from a Conference in Memory of George Forrest. Oxford: Oxford University Press. ISBN 978-0199253746.
- Dick, Michael B. (2004). ""David's Rise to Power" and the Neo-Babylonian Succession Apologies". David and Zion: Biblical Studies in Honor of J.J.M. Roberts. Winona Lake: Eisenbrauns. ISBN 978-1575060927.
- Gruenthaner, Michael J. (1949). "The Last King of Babylon". The Catholic Biblical Quarterly. 11 (4): 406–427. JSTOR 43720153.
- Lambert, Wilfred G. (1972). "Nabonidus in Arabia". Proceedings of the Seminar for Arabian Studies. 2: 53–64. JSTOR 41222956.
