= 539 BC =

539 BC in various calendars
- Gregorian calendar: 539 BC; DXXXIX BC
- Ab urbe condita: 215
- Ancient Egypt era: XXVI dynasty, 126
- Pharaoh: Amasis II, 32
- Ancient Greek Olympiad (summer): 60th Olympiad, year 2
- Assyrian calendar: 4212
- Balinese saka calendar: N/A
- Bengali calendar: −1132 – −1131
- Berber calendar: 412
- Buddhist calendar: 6
- Burmese calendar: −1176
- Byzantine calendar: 4970–4971
- Chinese calendar: 辛酉年 (Metal Rooster); 2159 or 1952 — to — 壬戌年 (Water Dog); 2160 or 1953
- Coptic calendar: −822 – −821
- Discordian calendar: 628
- Ethiopian calendar: −546 – −545
- Hebrew calendar: 3222–3223
- Hindu calendars
- Vikram Samvat: −482 – −481
- Shaka Samvat: N/A
- Kali Yuga: 2562–2563
- Holocene calendar: 9462
- Iranian calendar: 1160 BP – 1159 BP
- Islamic calendar: 1196 BH – 1195 BH
- Javanese calendar: N/A
- Julian calendar: N/A
- Korean calendar: 1795
- Minguo calendar: 2450 before ROC 民前2450年
- Nanakshahi calendar: −2006
- Thai solar calendar: 4–5
- Tibetan calendar: ལྕགས་མོ་བྱ་ལོ་ (female Iron-Bird) −412 or −793 or −1565 — to — ཆུ་ཕོ་ཁྱི་ལོ་ (male Water-Dog) −411 or −792 or −1564

The year 539 BC was a year of the pre-Julian Roman calendar. In the Roman Empire, it was known as year 215 Ab urbe condita (Latin: [ab ˈʊrbɛˈkɔndɪtaː]; 'from the founding of the City'). The denomination 539 BC for this year has been used since the early-medieval period, when the Anno Domini calendar era became the prevalent method in Europe for naming years.

== Events ==
=== By place ===
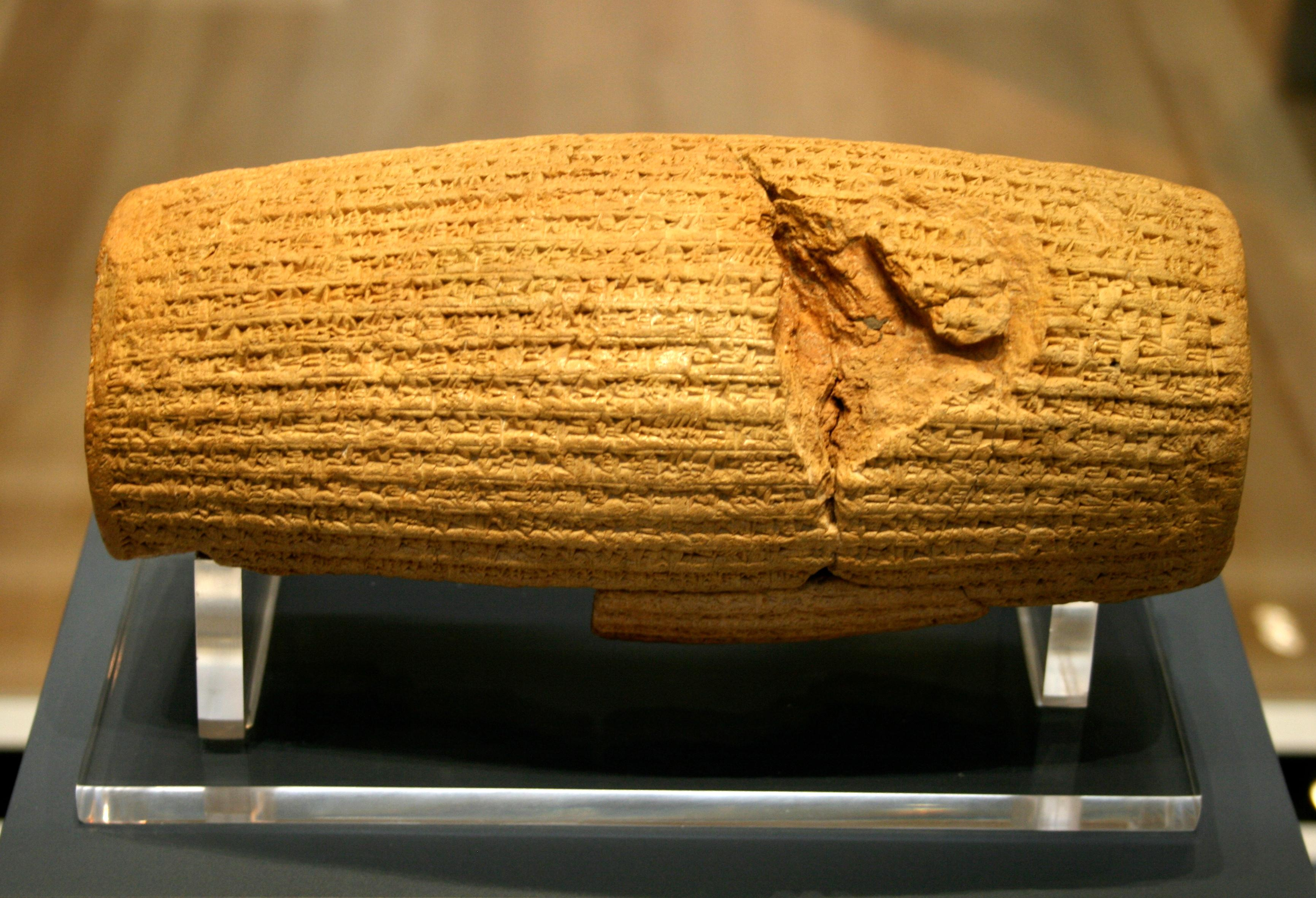
The Cyrus cylinder: a contemporary cuneiform script proclaims Cyrus the Great as legitimate king of Babylon.

==== Near East ====
- September 25–28? – Battle of Opis: Troops of the Persian Achaemenid Empire under Cyrus the Great decisively defeat those of the Neo-Babylonian Empire.
- October 29 – Fall of Babylon: Achaemenid troops under Gobryas enter Babylon unopposed. Cyrus enters the city, incorporating the Neo-Babylonian Empire into the Achaemenid Empire and turning the latter into the largest in the history of the world up until that point.

== Deaths ==
- Nabonidus, last king of Babylon
- Belshazzar, co-regent of Babylon
