= Gadatas =

6th-century BC Assyrian satrap

Gadatas (Ancient Greek: Γαδάτας) was a 6th-century BC Assyrian provencial governor (or satrap) who, according to Xenophon's Cyropaedia, defected to Cyrus the Great. His defection was motivated by a desire for revenge; the Assyrian king had made him a eunuch because one of the king's concubines had shown romantic interest in him, owing to his good looks.

Gadatas had helped Cyrus by secretly handing over a strategically important fortress. In response, the Assyrian king, Nabonidus, invaded Gadatas' province. Cyrus quickly came to his aid and rescued Gadatas and his troops. Fearing further retaliation from the Assyrians, Gadatas abandoned his province and joined Cyrus's army where his familiarity with the region made him a valuable asset. Later, during the capture of Babylon, Gadatas, along with the Persian general Gobryas, was recorded as killing the Assyrian king (although it might have been Belshazzar rather than Nabonidus).

The 12th-century Byzantine poet, John Tzetzes, also wrote about the life of Gadatas.
