= Battle of Opis =

Final battle between the Neo-Babylonian Empire and the Achaemenid Empire

- Part of the Campaigns of Cyrus the Great
Date	September 539 BC
Location	Opis, Babylonia, Mesopotamia (modern-day Iraq 33°10′53″N 44°42′00″E
Result	Persian victory
Territorial changes	Persian army captures Opis and Sippar

Belligerents
Neo-Babylonian Empire	Achaemenid Empire

Commanders and leaders
Nabonidus; Belshazzar (executed) ^{?}	Cyrus the Great; Gobryas

Strength
50,000 troops (per Herodotus); 10,000 troops (other estimates)	70,000 troops (per Herodotus)

Casualties and losses
Heavy	Unknown
- Location within modern-day Iraq

The Battle of Opis was the last major military engagement between the Achaemenid Empire and the Neo-Babylonian Empire, which took place in September 539 BC, during the Persian invasion of Mesopotamia. At the time, Babylonia was the last major power in Western Asia that was not yet under Persian control. The battle was fought in or near the strategic riverside city of Opis, located north of the capital city of Babylon in modern-day Iraq, and resulted in a decisive victory for Persia. Shortly afterwards, the Babylonian city of Sippar surrendered to Persian forces, who then supposedly entered Babylon without facing any further resistance. The Persian king Cyrus the Great was subsequently proclaimed as the king of Babylonia and its subject territories, thus ending its independence and incorporating the entirety of the fallen Neo-Babylonian Empire into the greater Achaemenid Empire.

== Location ==
The battle took place in and around Opis, an ancient city situated on the Tigris River and located about 80 kilometres (50 mi) north of Baghdad in modern-day Iraq. The city is thought to have been a preferred point to cross the Tigris; the classical Greek philosopher Xenophon describes a bridge at this point. The timing of the Persian invasion may have been determined by the ebb of the Mesopotamian rivers, which are at their lowest levels—and therefore easier to cross—in early autumn.

Opis was a place of considerable strategic importance; apart from the river crossing, it was at one end of the Median Wall, a fortified defensive barrier north of the ancient city of Babylon that had been built several decades earlier by the Babylonian king Nebuchadnezzar II. Control of Opis would have enabled the Persians to break through the Median Wall and open the road to the Babylonian capital.

== Sources ==
The main contemporary source of information on Cyrus's Mesopotamian campaign of 539 BC is the Nabonidus Chronicle, one of a series of clay tablets collectively known as the Babylonian Chronicles that record the history of ancient Babylonia. Some additional detail is provided by one of the few documents to have survived from Cyrus's lifetime, the Cyrus Cylinder. Further information on Cyrus's campaign is provided by the later ancient Greek writers Herodotus and Xenophon, though neither mention the battle at Opis and their accounts of the campaign differ considerably from the Persian and Babylonian sources. Most scholars prefer to use the Nabonidus Chronicle as the main source on the battle, as it is a contemporaneous source.

Although much of the Nabonidus Chronicle is fragmentary, the section relating to the last year of Nabonidus's reign – 539 BC – is mostly intact. It provides very little information about Cyrus's activities in the years immediately preceding the battle. The chronicler focuses on events of immediate relevance to Babylonia and its rulers, only occasionally records events outside Babylonia and does not provide much detail other than a bare outline of key incidents. There is almost no information for the period 547–539. Most of the chronicle's text for this period is illegible, making it impossible to assess the significance of the few words that can be read.

== Background ==
Ancient Near East prior to the invasion of Babylon by Cyrus the Great

At the time of the Battle of Opis, Persia was the leading power in the Near East. Its power had grown enormously under its king, Cyrus II, who had conquered a huge swathe of territory to create an empire that covered an area corresponding to the modern countries of Turkey, Armenia, Azerbaijan, Iran, Kyrgyzstan and Afghanistan. The only remaining significant unconquered power in the Near East was the Neo-Babylonian Empire, which controlled Mesopotamia and subject kingdoms such as Syria, Judea, Phoenicia and parts of Arabia. It had been closely linked with Cyrus's enemies elsewhere. The empire was previously an ally of Croesus of Lydia, whose kingdom was overrun by the Persians a few years prior to the invasion of Babylonia.

By the time of the battle, Babylonia was in an unpromising geopolitical situation; the Persian empire bordered it to the north, east and west. It had also been suffering severe economic problems exacerbated by plague and famine, and its king Nabonidus was said to be unpopular among many of his subjects for his unconventional religious policies. According to Mary Joan Winn Leith, "Cyrus's success is credited to military acumen, to judicious bribery, and to an energetic publicity campaign waged throughout Babylonia, which portrayed him as a lenient and religiously tolerant overlord." On the other hand, Max Mallowan notes: "Religious toleration was a remarkable feature of Persian rule and there is no question that Cyrus himself was a liberal-minded promoter of this humane and intelligent policy," and such a publicity campaign was in effect a means of permitting his reputation to precede his military campaign. Cyrus was said to have persuaded a Babylonian provincial governor named Gobryas (and a supposed Gadates) to defect to his side. Gutium, the territory governed by Gobryas, was a frontier region of considerable size and strategic importance, which Cyrus was said to have used as the starting point for his invasion.

The Nabonidus Chronicle records that prior to the battle, Nabonidus had ordered cult statues from outlying Babylonian cities to be brought into the capital, suggesting that the conflict had begun possibly in the winter of 540 BC. In a fragmentary section of the chronicle which is presumed to cover 540/39 BC, there is a possible reference to fighting, a mention of Ishtar and Uruk, and a possible reference to Persia. The Battle of Opis was thus probably only the final stage in an ongoing series of clashes between the two empires.

== Battle ==
Route of the Persian invasion of Babylonia, September–October 539 BC

The Nabonidus Chronicle records that the battle took place in the month of Tashritu (27 September–27 October) "at Opis on the [bank of the] Tigris". Very little is known about the events of the battle; the chronicle does not provide any details of the battle's course, the disposition of the forces on either side or the casualties inflicted. The Persian army under Cyrus fought "the army of Akkad" (meaning the Babylonians in general, not the city of that name). The identity of the Babylonian commander is not recorded in the chronicle. Some assume that Belshazzar, the son of Nabonidus, was in command as his fate is unclear. Beaulieu considers it was Nabonidus at Opis, owing to his flight after the defeat of the "army of Akkad", which was under his command, as opposed to the "ummani matitan" (foreigners/mercenaries) with Belshazzar.

The outcome of the battle was clearly a Babylonian defeat, possibly a rout, as the defeated Babylonian army is not mentioned again in the chronicle. Following the battle the Persian forces "took plunder" from the defeated Babylonians. Most translations of the Chronicle also refer to a "massacre" of "the people of Akkad", though translators disagree on which side was responsible and who was killed – the population of Opis or the retreating Babylonian army.

In Pierre Briant's view, "This victory was followed by an immense haul of booty and the massacre of those who attempted to resist." Andrew Robert Burn comments: "Indeed on one reading of the text, Akkad broke out into open revolt, and Nabonidus' last military achievement was slaughter of rebels." Maria Brosius interprets the massacre as a punitive action, "mak[ing] an example of a city trying to resist the Persian army". Cuyler Young comments on the Chronicle accounts: "This reference in the Chronicle suggests that the Persians captured intact the main camp of Nabonidus' army and that, as is so often the case, the real killing of the engagement came after the Babylonians had fallen prey to fear and panic and had retreated from the field." Amélie Kuhrt comments that the references to a massacre and looting suggest that the battle was "probably a hard-won victory". W. G. Lambert argues a contrarian view that there was no massacre or slaughter at all.

The battle is not mentioned in the inscription on the Cyrus Cylinder, which portrays Cyrus as liberating Babylon peacefully and with the consent of its people. However, the battle demonstrates that the existing Babylonian regime actively resisted Cyrus's invasion of Mesopotamia.

== Aftermath ==
The Babylonian defeat at Opis appears to have ended any serious resistance to the Persian invasion. The Nabonidus Chronicle states that following the battle, "on the fourteenth day [6 October] Sippar was captured without battle. Nabonidus fled." The chronicle's wording implies that Nabonidus was present in Sippar when the Persians arrived. Cyrus remained in Sippar, and "on the sixteenth day [12 October] Ug/Gubaru, governor of Gutium, and the army of Cyrus without a battle entered Babylon." Nabonidus himself was captured shortly afterward when he returned to Babylon. His ultimate fate is unclear, but according to the 3rd century BC Babylonian historian Berossus, Nabonidus was spared and he went into exile in Carmania, where he died years later. Persian troops took control of the city, though the Nabonidus Chronicle provides little detail of how this was done. The chronicle makes a point of noting the conquering army's protection of the city's most important temples and records that "Interruption of (rites/cults) in [the] Esagila [temple] or the [other] temples there was none, and no date was missed." Seventeen days later, on 29 October, Cyrus himself entered Babylon, where he was proclaimed king, issued royal proclamations and appointed governors of his newly conquered realm.

Ancient Greek accounts of Cyrus's campaign and the fall of Babylon differ significantly from the cuneiform accounts preserved in the Nabonidus Chronicle and the Cyrus Cylinder, suggesting that the Greeks were drawing on—or perhaps inventing—different traditions about the conquest of Babylonia. The two ancient Greek sources for the campaign, Herodotus and Xenophon, present broadly similar versions of events. According to Herodotus, Cyrus marched to Babylon along the side of the Diyala river (past Opis, though the battle is not mentioned), where the Persians fought a battle with the Babylonians near the capital. Cyrus subsequently laid siege to Babylon, ordering his troops to dig a canal to drain off part of the Euphrates to enable his troops to penetrate the city through weak points in its defences. Xenophon provides a similar but more elaborate account, claiming that Cyrus dug a huge trench around the city to divert the Euphrates and make the river bed passable for the Persian army. Herodotus, Xenophon and the Biblical Book of Daniel all assert that the Babylonians were taken by surprise while celebrating a festival.

Berossus presents an account that is different again, asserting that Cyrus defeated Nabonidus, who "fled with certain others and shut himself up in Borsippa. Meanwhile Cyrus occupied Babylon and ordered to destroy the exterior walls of the city, because the city seemed very formidable to him and difficult to capture. Afterward Cyrus marched to Borsippa, in order to organize the siege against Nabonidus. But Nabonidus did not await the end of the siege, and surrendered."

These accounts, written long after the Persian conquest, contradict many aspects of the contemporary cuneiform evidence, which does not mention any sieges, engineering works or battles near Babylon. The cuneiform descriptions of a peaceful surrender of Babylon are corroborated by archaeological evidence from the city, as no evidence of conflagrations or destruction have been found in the layers corresponding to the fall of the city to the Persians. Scholars are in general agreement that Herodotus's account is an invention, while Kuhrt comments that Xenophon's account in his Cyropedia is "virtually impossible to use ... as a strictly historical source" due to its literary form, as a moral treatise on Cyrus in the form of an historical novella. Paul-Alain Beaulieu suggests that the Greek accounts may constitute an aggregate of various folk tales and legends which came to be associated with the fall of Babylon." David George Hogarth and Samuel Rolles Driver comment on what they saw as Herodotus's unreliability:

The untrustworthiness of the accounts in Herodotus is evident as soon as they can be definitely compared with monumental records. The famous siege and capture of Babylon by Cyrus is contradicted by his inscription, which relates that, after a battle at Opis and another at Sippara, his general, Gobryas, entered the city without a struggle. Babylon had stood many sieges before the time of Cyrus, and stood many more afterwards : it is thought that one of the two captures by Darius, whose general was also named Gobryas, may have been confused with the entry of Cyrus.

According to the Behistun Inscription, Babylon revolted twice against Darius, and was recaptured on the second occasion by his general Gobryas. Herodotus only mentions the first revolt of Babylon in which Zopyrus captured the city for Darius, and omits this second revolt.

== Historiography ==
The Babylonian defeat at Opis and the apparently unopposed Persian entry into Babylon ended the independence of Babylonia (although there were a number of unsuccessful revolts against later Persian rulers). A number of explanations have been advanced for the collapse of the Babylonian state. The Cyrus Cylinder and the roughly contemporary Verse Account of Nabonidus attribute Nabonidus's failure to the desire of the god Marduk to punish a regime that had opposed his will. The strongly anti-Nabonidus tone of these documents, which accused the former king of behaving capriciously and neglecting the worship of the gods, suggests that their authors – the Babylonian priestly elite – were alienated from Nabonidus and may have welcomed a Persian takeover. It is, however, unclear how widely the Persians were supported within Babylonia, as accounts of the invasion and Nabonidus's rule are coloured by Cyrus's subsequent propaganda.

Other writers have advanced a number of additional or alternative explanations for the Babylonian defeat. M. A. Dandamaev suggests variously that the regime suffered from a lack of allies; a lack of support among the general population; opposition from subject peoples such as the Jews, who may have seen the invading Persians as liberators; and the inability of the Babylonian forces to resist numerically superior and better equipped opponents.
