= Fall of Babylon =

Conquest of the Neo-Babylonian Empire by the Achaemenid Empire

- Part of the Persian conquest of the Neo-Babylonian Empire
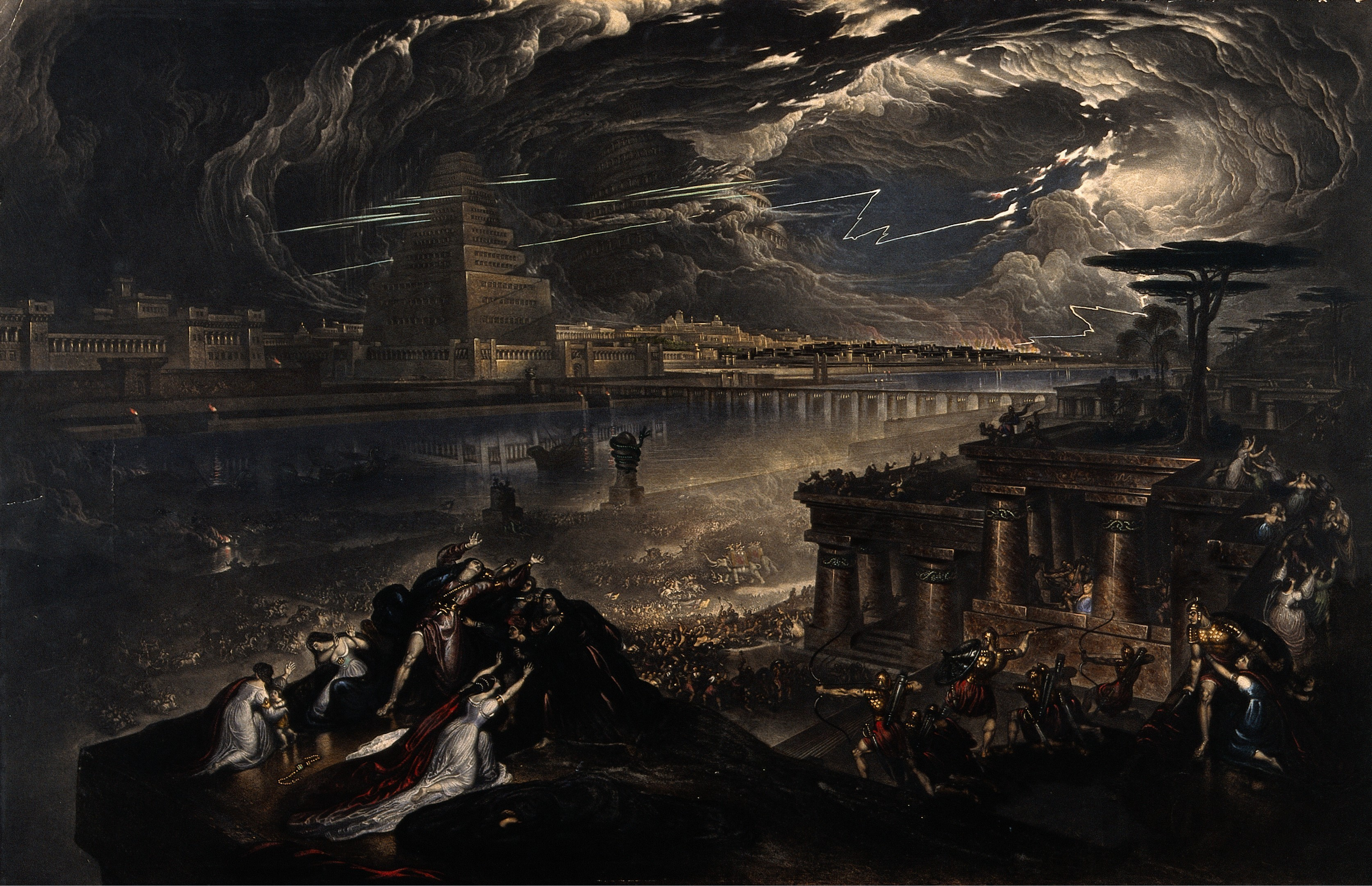
- The fall of Babylon; Cyrus the Great defeating the Chaldean (1819) by John Martin
Date	540–539 BCE
Location	Babylon, Babylonia, Mesopotamia (modern-day Iraq) 32°32′33″N 44°25′16″E
Result	Achaemenid victory
Territorial changes	Fall of the Neo-Babylonian Empire

Belligerents
Achaemenid Empire	Neo-Babylonian Empire

Commanders and leaders
Cyrus the Great; Gobryas	Nabonidus; Belshazzar (executed)

Strength
Unknown	Unknown
- Location within modern-day Iraq

The fall of Babylon occurred in 539 BCE, when the Achaemenid Empire conquered the Neo-Babylonian Empire. The success of the Persian campaign, led by Cyrus the Great, brought an end to the reign of the last native dynasty of Mesopotamia and gave the Persians control over the rest of the Fertile Crescent.

Nabonidus, the final Babylonian king and son of the Assyrian priestess Adad-guppi, had ascended to the throne by overthrowing his predecessor Labashi-Marduk in 556. For long periods, he would entrust rule to his son and crown prince Belshazzar, whose poor performance as a politician lost him the support of the priesthood and even the military class, in spite of his capability as a soldier.

To the east, the Persians' political and military power had been growing at a rapid pace under the Achaemenid dynasty, and by 540, Cyrus had initiated an offensive campaign against the Neo-Babylonian Empire. In late 539, the Persian army secured a crucial victory in the Battle of Opis, thereafter triumphantly entering the city of Babylon.

== Conditions ==
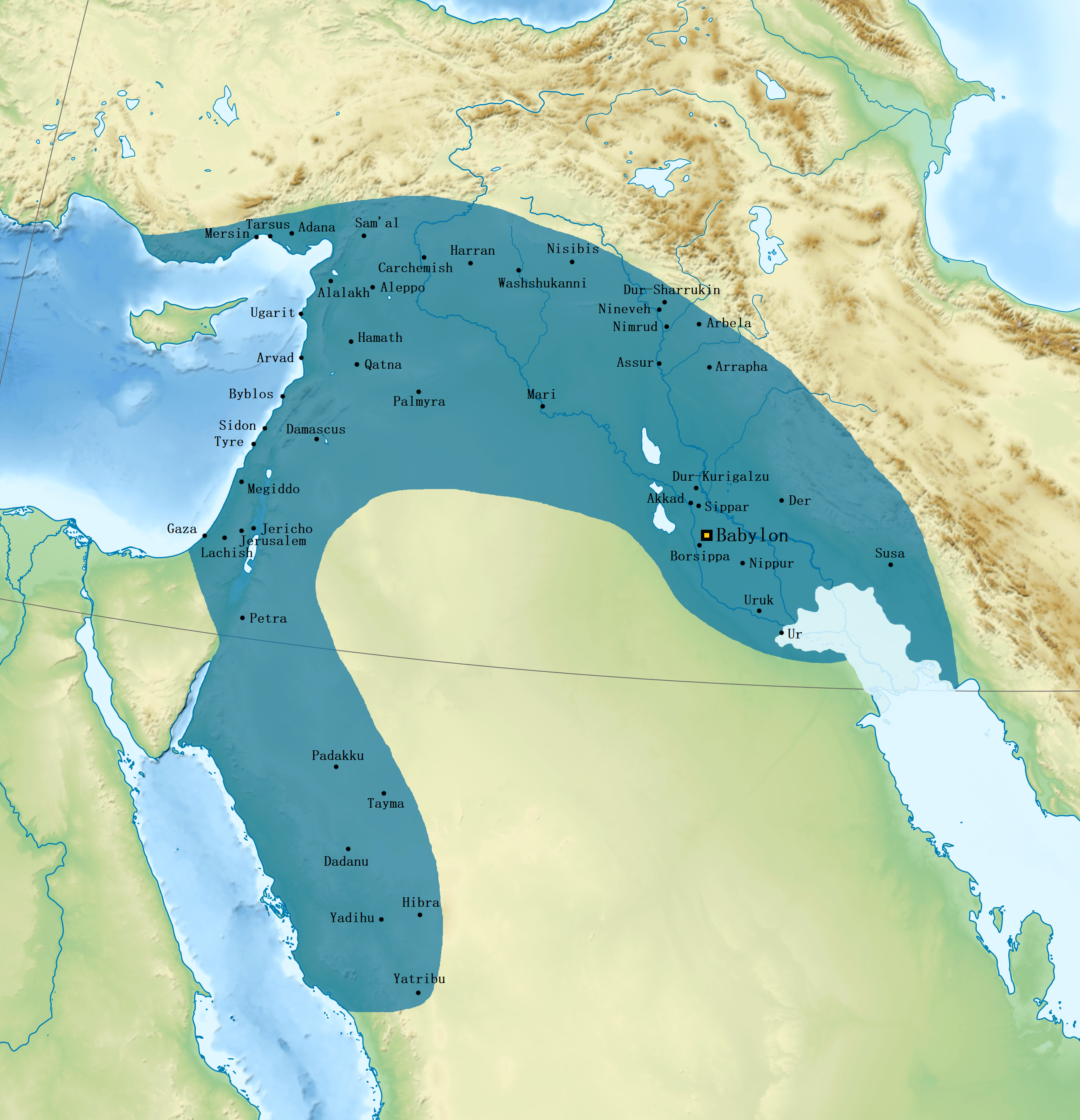
Map of the Neo-Babylonian Empire at its greatest territorial extent, under its final king, Nabonidus

Several factors led to the fall of Babylon. The population of Babylonia became increasingly disaffected with Nabonidus. The priesthood of Marduk hated him because he suppressed Marduk's cult and elevated the cult of the moon-god Sin. He excited a strong feeling against himself by attempting to centralize the religion of Babylonia in the temple of Marduk at Babylon, and thus alienated the local priesthoods.

The military despised his scholarly tastes. He seemed to have left the defense of the kingdom to Belshazzar (a capable soldier but poor diplomat who alienated the political elite), while occupying himself with studies like excavating foundation records of the temples to determine their dates. He also spent time outside Babylonia, rebuilding temples in the Assyrian city of Harran, and also among his Arab subjects in the southern deserts. Nabonidus and Belshazzar's Assyrian rather than Babylonian heritage is also likely to have added to this resentment.

== Preparations ==
In the sixth year of Nabonidus (550/549) Cyrus the Great, the Achaemenid Persian king of Anshan in Elam, revolted against his suzerain Astyages, king of the Manda or Medes, at Ecbatana. Astyages' army betrayed him, and Cyrus established his rule at Ecbatana, putting an end to the Median Empire and elevating the Persians among the Iranic peoples.

Three years later, Cyrus became king of all Persia and was engaged in a campaign to put down a revolt among the Assyrians in 547 BC. Meanwhile, Nabonidus had established a camp in the desert of his colony of Arabia, near the southern frontier of his kingdom, leaving his son Belshazzar (Belsharutsur) in command of the army. In 540, according to Dougherty and S.Smith, Cyrus invaded Syria, most of Babylon's eastern possessions. In a few months, many of Nabonidus's vassals were under Persian authority. Nabonidus had to return to Babylon in 543 BCE due to Cyrus constantly raiding the border.

== Invasion ==
In 539 BC, Cyrus invaded Babylonia. Persian forces entered the city of Babylon on October 12. Historical reconstruction of the fall of Babylon has been problematic, due to the inconsistencies between the various source documents. Both the Babylonian Chronicles and the Cyrus Cylinder describe Babylon being taken "without battle", whereas the Greek historians Herodotus and Xenophon report that the city was besieged. The biblical Book of Daniel notes that Belshazzar was killed, albeit without specifying the circumstances.

According to Xenophon, Belshazzar was killed in this conflict, but his account is not widely accepted. Nabonidus surrendered and was deported. Gutian guards were placed at the gates of the great temple of Bel, where the services continued without interruption. Cyrus did not arrive until 28/29 October, 17 days later, with Gobryas having acted for him in his absence. Gobryas was then made governor of the province of Babylon.

Babylon, like Assyria, became a colony of the Achaemenid Empire in 539 BC.

== Absorption ==
Map of the path of Cyrus the Great, during his 539 BCE invasion of Babylonia.

The Neo-Babylonian Empire had pursued a policy of population transfer but one of the first acts of Cyrus was to allow these exiles to return to their own homes, carrying with them the images of their gods and their sacred vessels. Permission to do so was embodied in a proclamation, whereby the conqueror endeavored to justify his claim to the Babylonian throne. According to the biblical account, Cyrus sent the Jewish exiles back to Israel from Babylonian captivity. Although the Jews never rebelled against the Persian occupation, they were restive under the period of Darius I consolidating his rule, and under Artaxerxes I, without taking up arms, or reprisals being exacted from the Persian government.

Among Babylonians, feelings were still strong that none had a right to rule over western Asia until he had been consecrated to the office by Bel and his priests; and accordingly, Cyrus henceforth assumed the imperial title of "King of Babylon". Cyrus claimed to be the legitimate successor of the ancient Babylonian kings and the avenger of Bel-Marduk and portrayed himself as the savior, chosen by Marduk to restore order and justice. Cyrus was assumed by the Marduk priesthood to be wrathful at the impiety of Nabonidus who had moved the images of the local gods from their ancestral shrines to his formal capital Babylon. A year before Cyrus' death, in 529 BCE, he elevated his son Cambyses II in the government, making him king of Babylon, while he reserved for himself the fuller title of "king of the (other) provinces" of the empire.

It was only when Darius I acquired the Persian throne and ruled it as a representative of the Zoroastrian religion that the old tradition was broken and the claim of Babylon to confer legitimacy on the rulers of western Asia ceased to be acknowledged. Immediately after Darius seized Persia, Babylonia briefly recovered its independence under a native ruler, Nidinta-Bel, who took the name of Nebuchadnezzar III. He purportedly reigned from October to December 521 BC, when the Persians took it by storm, while during this period, Assyria to the north also rebelled. A year later, in 521 BCE, Babylon again revolted and declared independence under the Armenian King Arakha, who took the name Nebuchadnezzar IV; on this occasion, after its capture by the Persians, the walls were partly destroyed. Esagila, the great temple of Bel, however, still continued to be maintained and was a center of Babylonian patriotism.

== Partition of Babylon ==
The Macedonian king Alexander the Great conquered Babylon in 331 BC, and died there in 323 BC. After a decade of wars between Alexander's former generals, Babylonia and Assyria were absorbed into the Macedonian Seleucid Empire.

It has long been maintained that the foundation of Seleucia diverted the population to the new capital of Babylonia, and that the ruins of the old city became a quarry for the builders of the new seat of government, but the recent publication of the Babylonian Chronicles of the Hellenistic Period has shown that urban life was still very much the same well into the Parthian age (150 BCE to 226 AD). The Parthian king Mithridates conquered the region into the Arsacid Empire in 150 BC, and the region became something of a battleground between Greeks and Parthians.

== Historiography ==
The cuneiform texts – the Nabonidus Chronicle, the Cyrus Cylinder and the so-called Verse Account of Nabonidus – were written after the Persian victory. They portray Nabonidus negatively and present Cyrus as the liberator of Babylon, the defender of the Babylonian gods and consequently as the legitimate successor to the Babylonian throne. Modern scholarship recognizes the Cyrus Cylinder as a propaganda tablet designed to manipulate the public against Nabonidus and to legitimize Cyrus' conquest of Babylon. Regarding its claim that Babylon fell to the Persians without opposition, Briant writes, "It appears prima facie unlikely that Babylon could have fallen without resistance", and Piotr Michalowski notes, "there is no contemporary evidence to support this suspicious claim." Similarly, the Nabonidus Chronicle is a rework of history from the Persian court purporting to be a text from Nabonidus. Its first part relates events that can be verified from other sources; however, the latter part, particularity when dealing with the seventeenth year of Nabonidus, is especially flattering of Cyrus, with the people of Babylon welcoming him by spreading green twigs before him.

Gauthier Tolini has proposed a plausible reconstruction of how Babylon fell. A receipt for reconstruction work on the Enlil Gate demonstrates that there was a forced entry into Babylon. Tolini proposes that a portion of the Persian army, under the command of General Ugbaru, penetrated the Enlil Gate on the West side of the Euphrates, then crossed the river to take the eastern districts of Babylon. This may be the source of the story by Herodotus that the Persian army, having diverted the Euphrates, entered Babylon along the riverbed. This surprise capture of Babylon is consistent with the story recorded in Daniel 5.

The timing of the attack may have contributed to the success of Ugbaru's strategy. Herodotus, Xenophon and Daniel 5 all record that Babylon was in the midst of a festival on the night it was taken. The Babylonian Chronicle records that Babylon was captured on the 16th of Tašrîtu, the equivalent of October 12 on the Julian Calendar (or October 6 on the Gregorian Calendar), which was the night before the akitu festival in honor of Sin, the moon god.

The Cyropaedia, a partly fictional biography of Cyrus the Great which may contain a historical core, contains content as described by Xenophon who had been in Persia as one of the Ten Thousand Greek soldiers who fought on the losing side in a Persian civil war, events which he recounted in his Anabasis. It is also possible that stories about Cyrus were told (and embellished) by Persian court society and that these are the basis of Xenophon's text. Herodotus, although writing long after the events, had traveled in Mesopotamia and spoken to Babylonians. In Cyropaedia (7.5.20–33), Xenophon, in agreement with Herodotus (I.292), says that the Achaemenid army entered the city via the channel of the Euphrates, the river having been diverted into trenches that Cyrus had dug for the invasion, and that the city was unprepared because of a great festival that was being observed.

Cyropaedia (7.5.26–35) describes the capture of Babylon by Gobryas, who led a detachment of men to the capital and killed the king of Babylon. In 7.5.25, Gobryas remarks that "this night the whole city is given over to revelry", including to some extent the guards. Those who opposed the forces under Gobryas were struck down, including those outside the banquet hall. The capture of the city, and the slaying of the son king of the king (4.6.3), is described in Cyropaedia (7:5.26–30) as follows:

Thereupon they entered; and of those they met some were struck down and slain, and others fled into their houses, and some raised the hue and cry, but Gobryas and his friends covered the cry with their shouts, as though they were revelers themselves. And thus, making their way by the quickest route, they soon found themselves before the king's palace. (27) Here the detachment under Gobryas and Gadatas found the gates closed, but the men appointed to attack the guards rushed on them as they lay drinking round a blazing fire, and closed with them then and there. (28) As the din grew louder and louder, those within became aware of the tumult, till, the king bidding them see what it meant, some of them opened the gates and ran out. (29) Gadatas and his men, seeing the gates swing wide, darted in, hard on the heels of the others who fled back again, and they chased them at the sword's point into the presence of the king. (30) They found him on his feet, with his drawn scimitar in his hand. By sheer weight of numbers they overwhelmed him: and not one of his retinue escaped, they were all cut down, some flying, others snatching up anything to serve as a shield and defending themselves as best they could.

Both Xenophon and Daniel 5 describe the demise of Belshazzar on the night that the city was taken. Xenophon, Herodotus, and Daniel agree that the city was taken by surprise, at the time of a festival, and with some (but apparently not much) loss of life. The Cyropaedia (4.6.3) states that a father and son were both reigning over Babylon when the city fell, and that the younger ruler was killed.

A new system of government was put in place and the Persian multi-national state was developed. This system of government reached its peak after the conquest of Egypt by Cambyses II during his reign, thereafter receiving its ideological foundation in the inscription of the Persian kings.

== Hebrew Bible ==
=== Book of Isaiah ===
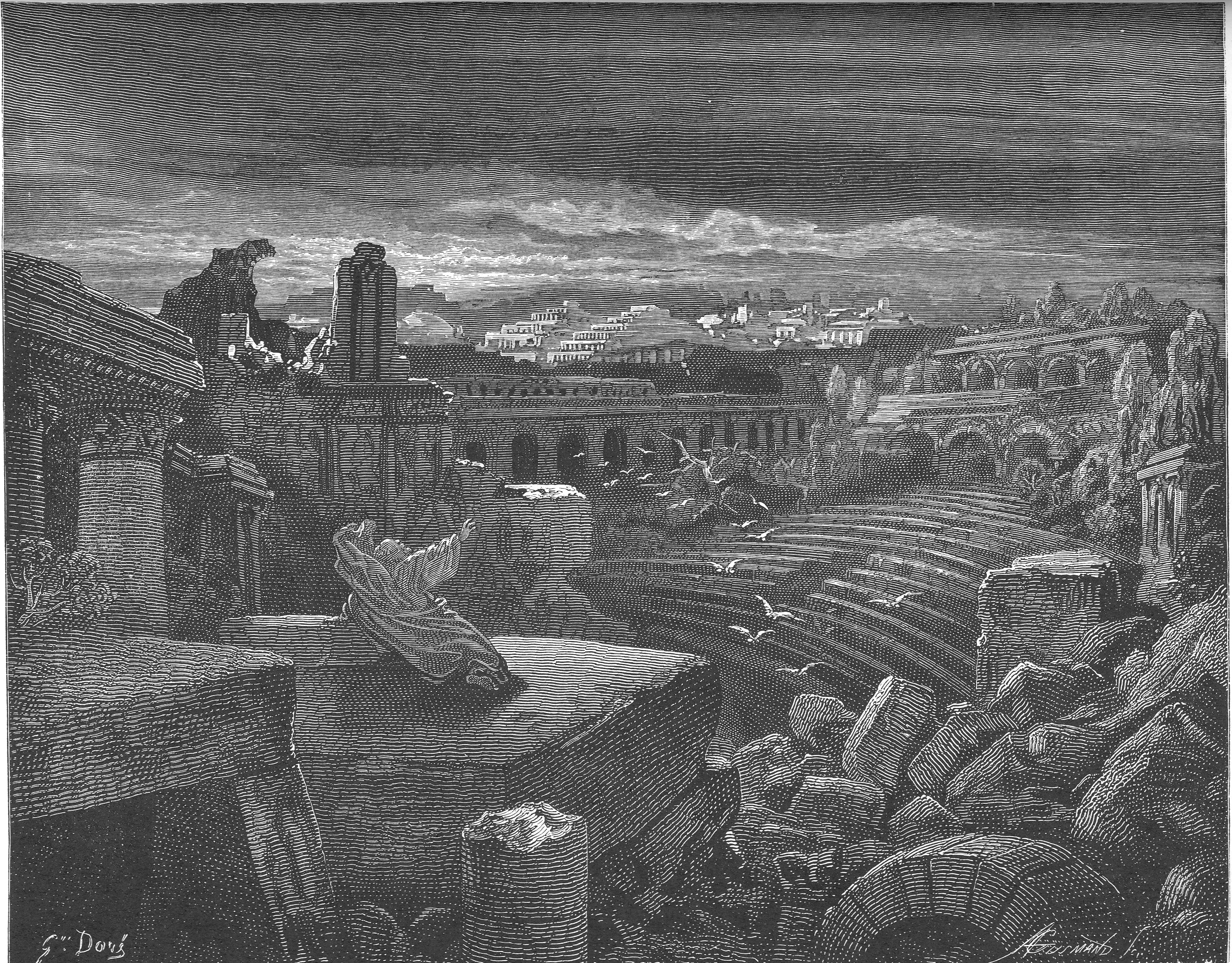
Engraving of Isaiah's vision concerning the destruction of Babylon by Gustave Doré

The conquest of Jerusalem by the Neo-Babylonian Empire and the exile of its elite in 586 BCE ushered in the next stage in the formation of the Book of Isaiah. Deutero-Isaiah addresses himself to the Israelites in exile, offering them the hope of return. Deutero-Isaiah's predictions of the imminent fall of Babylon and his glorification of Cyrus as the deliverer of Israel date his prophecies to 550–539 BCE, and probably towards the end of this period.

=== Book of Daniel ===
The Book of Daniel chapter 5 relates the final night of Belshazzar, just before the Persian invasion. In the account, Belshazzar holds a feast, during which Belshazzar proclaims his guests receive the temple treasures from Jerusalem to drink from them, while praising Babylonian gods. He then sees a hand writing on the palace wall. The words that were written according to the Scriptures: MENE, MENE, TEKEL, UPHARSIN. The queen tells Belshazzar of Daniel, and he is called to interpret the writing after Belshazzar's wise men are unable. Daniel explains the writing: Mene; God hath numbered thy kingdom, and finished it. Tekel; Thou art weighed in the balances, and art found wanting. Peres; Thy kingdom is divided, and given to the Medes and Persians. Belshazzar is killed that night, and Darius the Mede, becomes king (Daniel 5).

== See also ==
- Whore of Babylon
- Medo-Babylonian conquest of the Assyrian Empire
- Fall of Nineveh
- Wars of Alexander the Great
- War of Actium
- Sack of Rome (410)
- Siege of Baghdad
