= Neo-Babylonian Empire =

Ancient Mesopotamian empire (626–539 BC)

Neo-Babylonian Empire: māt Bābil (Note: māt Bābil means "the land of Babylon" in Akkadian.); māt Akkadi (Note: māt Akkadi means "the land of Akkad" in Akkadian.); māt Šumeri u Akkadi (Note: māt Šumeri u Akkadi means "the land of Sumer and Akkad" in Akkadian.)
- 626 BC – 539 BC
- Stylized symbol of the sun-god Shamash, often represented on poles as a standard from the Akkadian period down to the Neo-Babylonian period

- The Neo-Babylonian Empire at its greatest extent.
- Capital: Babylon
- Common languages: Akkadian; Imperial Aramaic
- Religion: Babylonian religion
- Government: Monarchy
- King
  - 626–605 BC: Nabopolassar
  - 605–562 BC: Nebuchadnezzar II
  - 562–560 BC: Amel-Marduk
  - 560–556 BC: Neriglissar
  - 556 BC: Labashi-Marduk
  - 556–539 BC: Nabonidus
- History
  - Revolt of Babylon: 626 BC
  - Fall of Nineveh: 612 BC
  - Siege of Jerusalem: 587 BC
  - Battle of Opis: 539 BC

Area
- 562 BC: 500,000 km^{2} (190,000 sq mi)
Preceded by
Neo-Assyrian Empire
Kingdom of Judah
Philistia
Succeeded by
Achaemenid Empire

The Neo-Babylonian Empire or Second Babylonian Empire, historically known as the Chaldean Empire, was the last polity ruled by monarchs native to ancient Mesopotamia. Beginning with the coronation of Nabopolassar as the King of Babylon in 626 BC and being firmly established through the fall of the Assyrian Empire in 612–609 BC, the Neo-Babylonian Empire was conquered by the Achaemenid Persian Empire in 539 BC, less than a century after the founding of the Chaldean dynasty. The defeat of the Assyrian Empire and subsequent return of power to Babylon marked the first time that the city, and southern Mesopotamia in general, had risen to dominate the ancient Near East since the collapse of the Old Babylonian Empire (under Hammurabi) nearly a thousand years earlier. Neo-Babylonian rule produced unprecedented economic and population growth across Babylonia and sparked a cultural and artistic renaissance as its kings initiated major building projects, chiefly in Babylon, reviving many elements of the preceding two thousand years of Sumero-Akkadian culture.

The Neo-Babylonian Empire retains a notable position in modern cultural memory due to the portrayal of Babylon and its greatest king Nebuchadnezzar II in the Bible. The biblical account of Nebuchadnezzar describes his military campaign against the Kingdom of Judah, and in particular the Babylonian siege of Jerusalem in 587 BC which resulted in the destruction of Solomon's Temple and the subsequent Babylonian captivity. The Bible also describes the majesty of Nebuchadnezzar's rule and his sympathetic relationship with his Jewish captives. Babylonian sources describe Nebuchadnezzar's reign as a golden age that transformed Babylonia into the greatest empire of its time.

Religious policies introduced by the final Babylonian king Nabonidus, who favoured the moon god Sîn over Babylon's patron deity Marduk, eventually served as a casus belli for Persian king Cyrus the Great, who invaded Babylonia in 539 BC by portraying himself as a champion of Marduk divinely restoring order to Mesopotamia. After the conquest, Babylon remained culturally distinct for centuries, with references to people with Babylonian names and to the Babylonian religion known from as late as the Parthian Empire in the 1st century BC. Although Babylon revolted several times during the rule of later empires, it never successfully restored its independence.

== Background ==
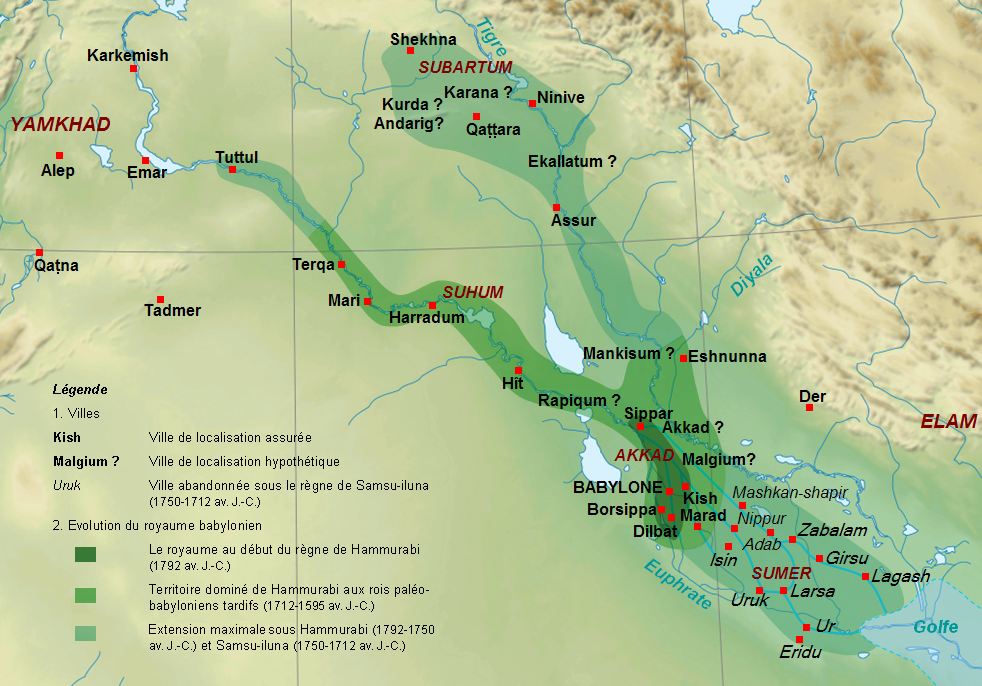
Map of the Old Babylonian Empire under Hammurabi (r. c. 1792–1750 BC)

Babylonia was founded as an independent state by an Amorite chieftain named Sumu-abum c. 1894 BC. For over a century after its founding, it was a minor and relatively weak state, overshadowed by older and more powerful states such as Isin, Larsa, Assyria and Elam. But Hammurabi (r. c. 1792–1750 BC) turned Babylon into a major power and eventually conquered Mesopotamia and beyond, founding the Old or First Babylonian Empire. After his death, his dynasty lasted another century and a half, but the Babylonian Empire quickly collapsed, and Babylon once more became a small state. Babylonia fell to the Hittite king Mursili I c. 1595 BC, after which the Kassites took control and ruled for almost five centuries before being deposed by native Babylonian rulers, who continued to rule the Babylonian rump state.

The population of Babylonia in this so-called "Post-Kassite" or Middle Babylonian period comprised two main groups, the native Babylonians (composed of the descendants of the Sumerians and Akkadians and the assimilated Amorites and Kassites) and recently arrived, unassimilated tribesmen from the Levant (Suteans, Arameans and Chaldeans). By the 8th century BC, the constituent groups of the native Babylonians, the main population in the large cities, had lost their old identities and had assimilated into a unified "Babylonian" culture. At the same time, the Chaldeans, though retaining their tribal structure and way of life, were becoming more "babylonized", many adopting traditional Babylonian names. These Babylonized Chaldeans became important players in the Babylonian political scene and by 730 BC, all the major Chaldean tribes had produced at least one Babylonian king.

The 9th and 8th centuries BC were catastrophic for the independent Babylonian kingdom, with many weak kings either failing to control all the constituent groups, to defeat rivals, or to maintain important trade routes. This collapse eventually resulted in their powerful northern neighbor, the Neo-Assyrian Empire, conquering and incorporating Babylonia in 729 BC, with the King of Assyria becoming also King of Babylon. The conquest began a century-long struggle for Babylonian independence against an unstable Assyrian rule, including several unsuccessful Babylonian revolts.

== History ==
=== Foundation and the fall of Assyria ===
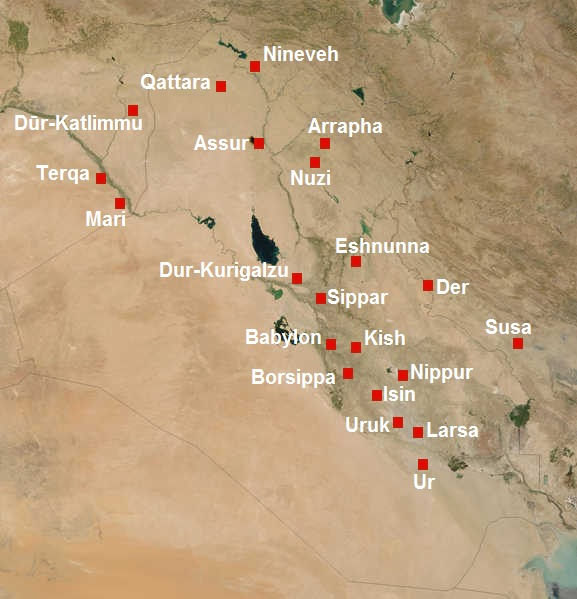
Locations of several major Mesopotamian cities

Early in the reign of the Neo-Assyrian king Sinsharishkun, the southern (Note: The exact origin of Nabopolassar is uncertain and he has variously been referred to as an Assyrian, a Babylonian and a Chaldean. Though his ethnicity is uncertain, it is considered likely that he was from southern Mesopotamia.) official or general Nabopolassar revolted amid ongoing political instability in Assyria, caused by an earlier brief civil war between Sinsharishkun and the general Sin-shumu-lishir. In 626 BC, Nabopolassar assaulted and successfully seized the cities of Babylon and Nippur. Sinsharishkun's response was quick and decisive; by October of that year the Assyrians had recaptured Nippur and besieged Nabopolassar at the city of Uruk. However, Sinsharishkun failed to capture Babylon, and Nabopolassar endured the siege of Uruk, repulsing the Assyrian army.

In November 626 BC, Nabopolassar was crowned King of Babylon, restoring Babylonia as an independent kingdom after more than a century of direct Assyrian rule. The Assyrian king had little success in his campaigns in northern Babylonia from 625 to 623 BC, as Der and other southern cities joined Nabopolassar. Sinsharishkun led a massive counterattack in 623 BC which seemed on a path to victory, but he had to abandon the campaign as a revolt in Assyria threatened his throne at home.

This left the Babylonians free to conquer the last remaining Assyrian seats of power in Babylonia from 622 to 620 BC. Both Uruk and Nippur, cities which had shifted the most between Assyrian and Babylonian control, were firmly in Babylonian hands by 620 BC, and Nabopolassar had consolidated his rule over all of Babylonia. After further Babylonian conquests and further failures by Sinsharishkun despite military support from Egypt, the Assyrian Empire quickly began to fall apart.

In October or November 615 BC, the Medes under King Cyaxares, who were also ancient enemies of Assyria, entered the weakening empire and seized the district of Arrapḫa. In July or August 614 BC, they attacked the cities of Kalhu and Nineveh and besieged Assur, the ancient religious capital of Assyria. The siege was successful and the city endured a brutal sack. Nabopolassar arrived at Assur after the plunder had begun and met with Cyaxares, allying with him and signing an anti-Assyrian pact. In April or May 612 BC, at the start of Nabopolassar's 14th year as King of Babylon, the combined Medo-Babylonian army marched on the Assyrian capital of Nineveh. From June to August, they besieged the city and in August, they breached the walls, leading to another lengthy and brutal sack, during which Sinsharishkun is assumed to have died. Sinsharishkun's successor, Ashur-uballit II, the final king of Assyria, was defeated at Harran in 609 BC. Egypt, Assyria's ally, continued the war against Babylon for a few more years, before being decisively defeated by Nabopolassar's crown prince Nebuchadnezzar at Carchemish in 605 BC.

=== Reign of Nebuchadnezzar II ===
Nebuchadnezzar II succeeded Nabopolassar in 605 BC upon the death of his father. The empire he inherited was among the most powerful in the world, and he quickly reinforced his father's alliance with the Medes by marrying Cyaxares's daughter or granddaughter, Amytis. Some sources suggest that the famous Hanging Gardens of Babylon, one of the Seven Wonders of the Ancient World, were built by Nebuchadnezzar for his wife to remind her of her homeland (though the existence of these gardens is debated). Nebuchadnezzar's 43-year reign brought with it a golden age for Babylon, which became the most powerful kingdom in the Middle East.

Nebuchadnezzar's most famous campaigns today are his wars in the Levant. These campaigns began relatively early in his reign and were chiefly conducted to consolidate his empire by incorporating the newly independent kingdoms and city-states which had been vassals of the defeated Neo-Assyrian Empire. His 587 BC destruction of Jerusalem ended the Kingdom of Judah and scattered its populace, with many of its elite citizens taken as prisoners to Babylon, initiating a period known as the Babylonian Captivity. Nebuchadnezzar subsequently besieged Tyre for 13 years. Though he did not capture the city, invulnerable on an island 800 metres from the coast which could not be taken without naval support, it eventually surrendered to him in 573 BC, agreeing to be ruled by vassal kings. Tyre was never captured until Alexander the Great's siege in 332 BC.

It is possible that Nebuchadnezzar campaigned against Egypt in 568–567 BC, given that a fragmentary Babylonian inscription, given the modern designation BM 33041, from that year records the word "Egypt" as well as possibly traces of the name "Amasis" (the name of the then incumbent Pharaoh, Amasis II, r. 570–526 BC). A stele of Amasis from the 4th year of his reign in 567 BC, also fragmentary, may also describe a combined naval and land attack by the Babylonians. Recent evidence suggests that the Babylonians were initially successful during the invasion and gained a foothold in Egypt, but they were repelled by Amasis' forces. Evidence for this campaign is scant, and historians believe that if Nebuchadnezzar launched another campaign, he was unsuccessful. (However, some have suggested that Nebuchadnezzar came to defeat Apries, with the combined forces of Amasis and Nebuchadnezzar managing to kill him, securing Amasis' throne, though as a vassal king.)

In addition to his military exploits, Nebuchadnezzar was a great builder, famous for his monuments and building works throughout Mesopotamia, such as Babylon's Ishtar Gate and Processional Street. He is known to have completely renovated at least 13 cities, but spent most of his time and resources on the capital, Babylon. By 600 BC, the Babylonians and possibly their subject peoples saw Babylon as the literal and figurative center of the world. Nebuchadnezzar widened Processional Street and fitted it with new decorations, making the annual New Year's Festival, honoring the city's patron deity Marduk, more spectacular than ever before.

=== Later history ===
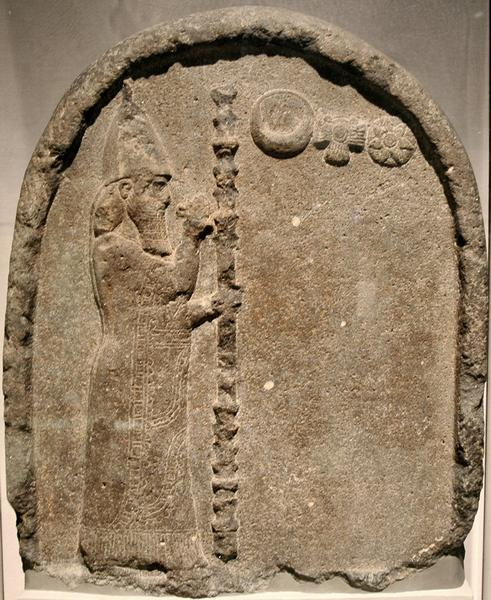
Stele of Nabonidus exhibited in the British Museum. The king is shown praying to the Moon, the Sun and Venus and is depicted as being the closest to the Moon.

After Nebuchadnezzar II, the empire fell into political turmoil and instability. His son and successor, Amel-Marduk, reigned for only two years before being assassinated in a coup by the influential courtier Neriglissar. Neriglissar was a simmagir, a governor of one of the eastern provinces, and had been present during several of Nebuchadnezzar's campaigns. Importantly, Neriglissar was also married to one of Nebuchadnezzar's daughters and thus linked to the royal family. Possibly due to old age, Neriglissar's reign was also short, with some of its few recorded activities being the restoration of some monuments in Babylon and a campaign in Cilicia. Neriglissar died in 556 BC and was succeeded by his underage son, Labashi-Marduk. Labashi-Marduk's reign was even briefer: he was assassinated after just nine months.

The perpetrators of the assassination, the influential courtier Nabonidus and his son Belshazzar, then took power; despite the palace turmoil, the empire remained relatively calm. Nabonidus began his reign with traditional royal duties: renovating buildings and monuments, worshipping the gods, and waging war (campaigning in Cilicia). He was not of Babylonian ancestry, originating from Harran in former Assyria, a city devoted to the moon god Sîn, which may have antagonized the Babylonian clergy. Nabonidus also clashed with the clergy when he tightened government control over the temples in an attempt to reform their management.

Nabonidus left Babylonia to campaign in the Levant, unaccountably settling for ten years in the conquered city of Tayma in northern Arabia, while the crown prince Belshazzar was left to govern Babylonia. Returning c. 543 BC, Nabonidus reorganized his court and removed some of its powerful members.

=== Fall of Babylon ===
Map of the path of Cyrus the Great during his 539 BC invasion of Babylonia.

In 549 BC Cyrus the Great, the Achaemenid king of Persia, revolted against the Median king Astyages at Ecbatana. Astyages' army betrayed him and Cyrus established himself as ruler of all the Iranian peoples, as well as the Elamites and Gutians, ending the Median Empire and establishing the Achaemenid Empire. Ten years after his victory against the Medes, Cyrus invaded Babylon. Nabonidus sent Belshazzar to meet the Persian army, but the Babylonian forces were defeated at the Battle of Opis. On 12 October, after Cyrus's engineers diverted the waters of the Euphrates, the soldiers of Cyrus entered Babylon without the need for battle. Nabonidus surrendered and was deported. Gutian guards were placed at the gates of the great temple of Marduk, where services continued without interruption.

Cyrus claimed to be the legitimate successor of the ancient Babylonian kings and the avenger of Marduk over Nabonidus's supposed impiety. Cyrus's conquest was welcomed by the Babylonian populace, whether as a genuine liberator or an undeniable conqueror. Cyrus's invasion of Babylonia may have been helped by foreign exiles such as the Jews. Accordingly, one of his first acts was to allow these exiles to return to their homelands, carrying their sacred images and vessels. This was explicitly granted in a proclamation, the Cyrus Cylinder, in which Cyrus also justifies his conquests as the will of Marduk. Babylon never again attained the status of an independent state.

== Aftermath and legacy ==
=== Babylon under foreign rule ===
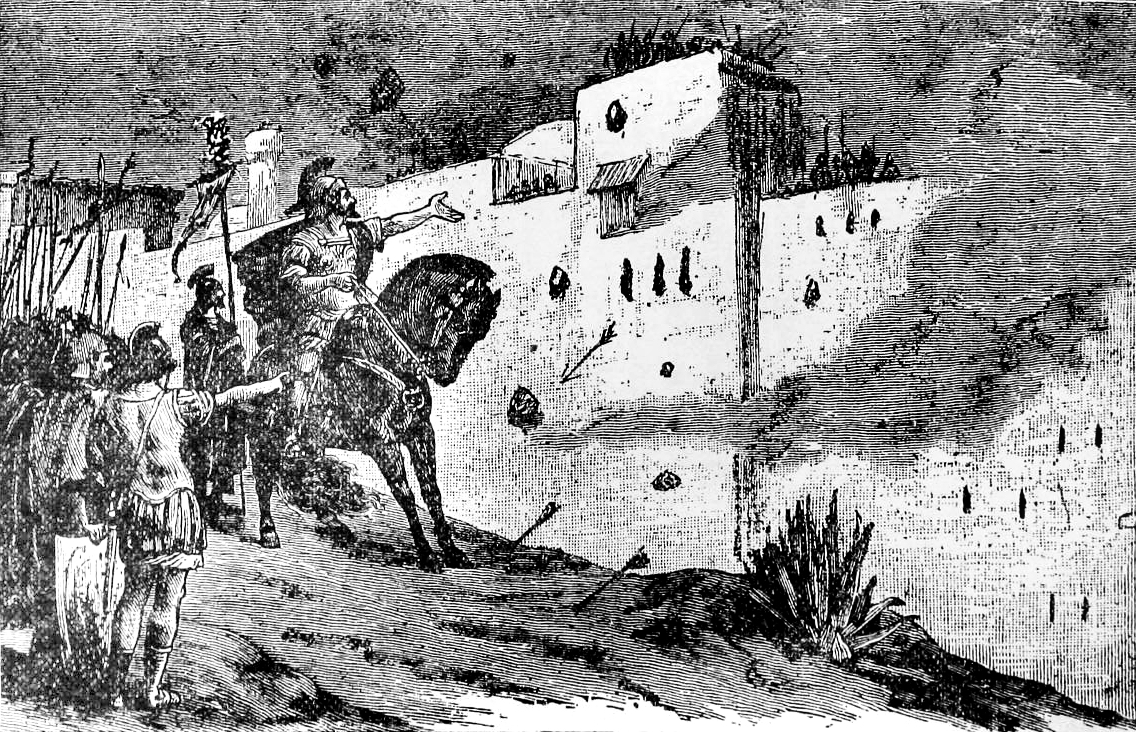
Illustration of the inhabitants of Babylon deriding the Achaemenid king Darius I during the revolt of Nebuchadnezzar III in 522 BC. From the History of Darius the Great (1900) by Jacob Abbott.

The early Achaemenid rulers had great respect for Babylonia, regarding it as a separate entity or kingdom united with their own kingdom in something akin to a personal union. The region was a major economical asset and provided as much as a third of the entire Achaemenid Empire's tribute. Despite Achaemenid attention and the recognition of the Achaemenid rulers as kings of Babylon, Babylonia resented the Achaemenids, like the Assyrians had been resented a century earlier. At least five rebels proclaimed themselves King of Babylon and revolted during the time of Achaemenid rule in attempts at restoring native rule; Nebuchadnezzar III (522 BC), Nebuchadnezzar IV (521–520 BC), Bel-shimanni (484 BC), Shamash-eriba (482–481 BC) and Nidin-Bel (336 BC). The revolt of Shamash-eriba against Xerxes I in particular is suggested by ancient sources to have had dire consequences for the city. Though no direct evidence exists, Babylon appears to have been severely punished for the revolt. Its fortifications were destroyed and its temples damaged as Xerxes ravaged the city. It is possible that the sacred statue of Marduk, which represented the physical manifestation of Babylon's patron deity, was removed by Xerxes from Babylon's main temple, the Esagila, at this time. Xerxes also divided the previously large Babylonian satrapy (composing virtually all of the Neo-Babylonian Empire's territory) into smaller sub-units.

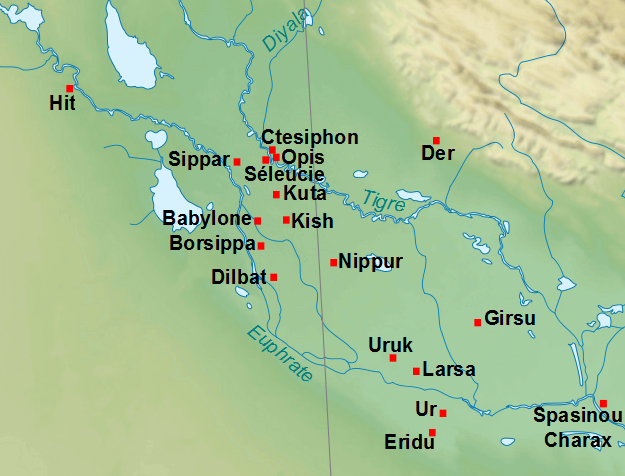
Major cities of Lower Mesopotamia in the 1st millennium BC

Babylonian culture endured for centuries under the Achaemenids and survived under the rule of the later Hellenic Macedonian and Seleucid Empires, with the rulers of these empires also listed as kings of Babylon in Babylonian civil documents. It was first under the rule of the Parthian Empire that Babylon was gradually abandoned as a major urban center and the old Akkadian culture truly disappeared. In the first century or so of Parthian rule, Babylonian culture was still alive, and there are records of people in the city with traditional Babylonian names, such as Bel-aḫḫe-uṣur and Nabu-mušetiq-uddi (mentioned as the receivers of silver in a 127 BC legal document). At this time, two major recognized groups lived in Babylon: the Babylonians and the Greeks, who settled there during the centuries of Macedonian and Seleucid rule. These groups were governed by separate local (e.g. pertaining to just the city) administrative councils; Babylonian citizens were governed by the šatammu and the kiništu and Greeks by the epistates. Although no king lists younger than the Seleucid Empire survive, documents from the early years of Parthian rule suggest a continued recognition of at least the early Parthian kings as kings of Babylon.

Although Akkadian-language legal documents continued in a slightly reduced number through the rule of the Hellenic kings, they are rare from the period of Parthian rule. The astronomical diaries kept since the days of ancient Babylon survived through Persian and Hellenic rule but stopped being written in the mid-1st century BC. Under the Parthian kings, likely only a handful of scholars still knew how to write Akkadian, while traditional Babylonian temples lost personnel and revenue as the population shifted toward newer capitals such as Seleucia and Ctesiphon.

The latest dated document written in accordance with the old scribal tradition in Akkadian cuneiform is from 35 BC and contains a prayer to Marduk. The latest known other documents written in Akkadian are astronomic predictions (e.g. planetary movements) for 75 AD. The way the signs are written in these astronomic texts means that readers would not have to be familiar with Akkadian to understand them. If the Akkadian language and Babylonian culture survived beyond these sparse documents, it was decisively wiped out c. 230 AD with the religious reforms introduced in the Sasanian Empire. By this time, the ancient Babylonian cult centres had already been closed and razed. Some temples had been closed during the early Parthian period, such as many temples in Uruk, whilst others lingered on to near the end of the Parthian Empire, such as the Esagila in Babylon.

=== Legacy of Babylon ===
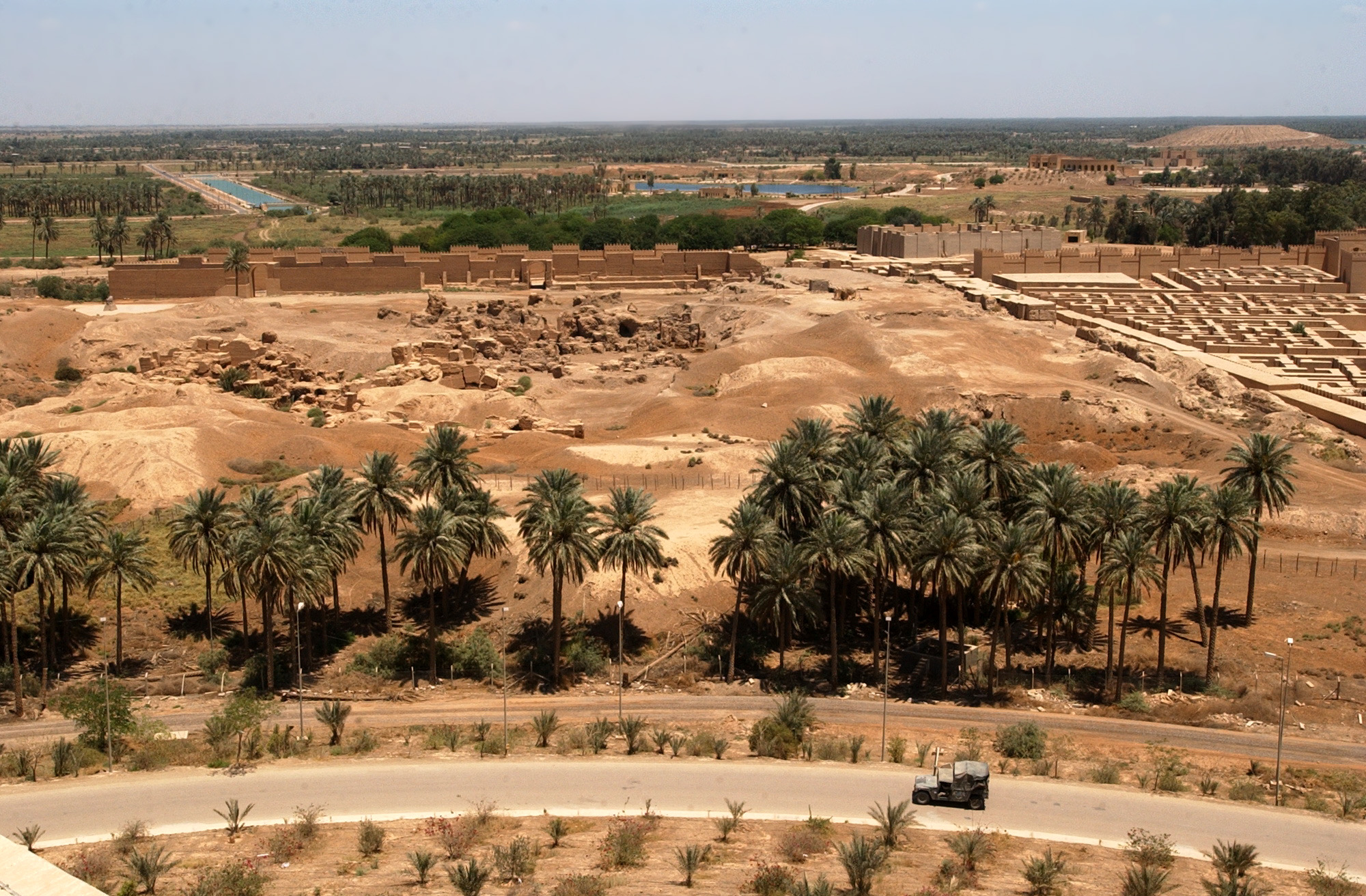
Partial view of the ruins of Babylon in modern-day Iraq

Before modern archaeological excavations in Mesopotamia, the political history, society and appearance of ancient Babylonia was largely a mystery. Western artists typically envisioned the city and its empire as a combination of known ancient cultures—typically a mixture of ancient Greek and Egyptian culture—with some influence from the then-contemporary Middle Eastern empire, the Ottoman Empire. Early depictions of the city show it with long colonnades, sometimes built on more than a level, completely unlike the actual architecture of real ancient Mesopotamian cities, with obelisks and sphinxes inspired by those of Egypt. Ottoman influence came in the shape of cupolas and minarets dotted through the imagined appearances of the ancient city.

Babylon is perhaps most famous today for its repeated appearances in the Bible, where it appears both literally (in reference to historical events) and allegorically (symbolizing other things). The Neo-Babylonian Empire is featured in several prophecies and in descriptions of the destruction of Jerusalem and subsequent Babylonian captivity. Because of its sordid reputation for atrocities, including sexual abuse, in Jewish tradition, Babylon symbolizes an oppressor. In Christianity, Babylon symbolizes worldliness and evil. Prophecies sometimes symbolically link the kings of Babylon with Lucifer. Nebuchadnezzar II, sometimes conflated with Nabonidus, appears as the foremost ruler in this narrative.

The Book of Revelation in the Christian Bible refers to Babylon many centuries after it ceased to be a major political center. The city is personified by the "Whore of Babylon", riding on a scarlet beast with seven heads and ten horns and drunk on the blood of the saints. Some scholars of apocalyptic literature believe this New Testament "Babylon" to be a dysphemism for the Roman Empire.

== Culture and society ==
=== Religion ===
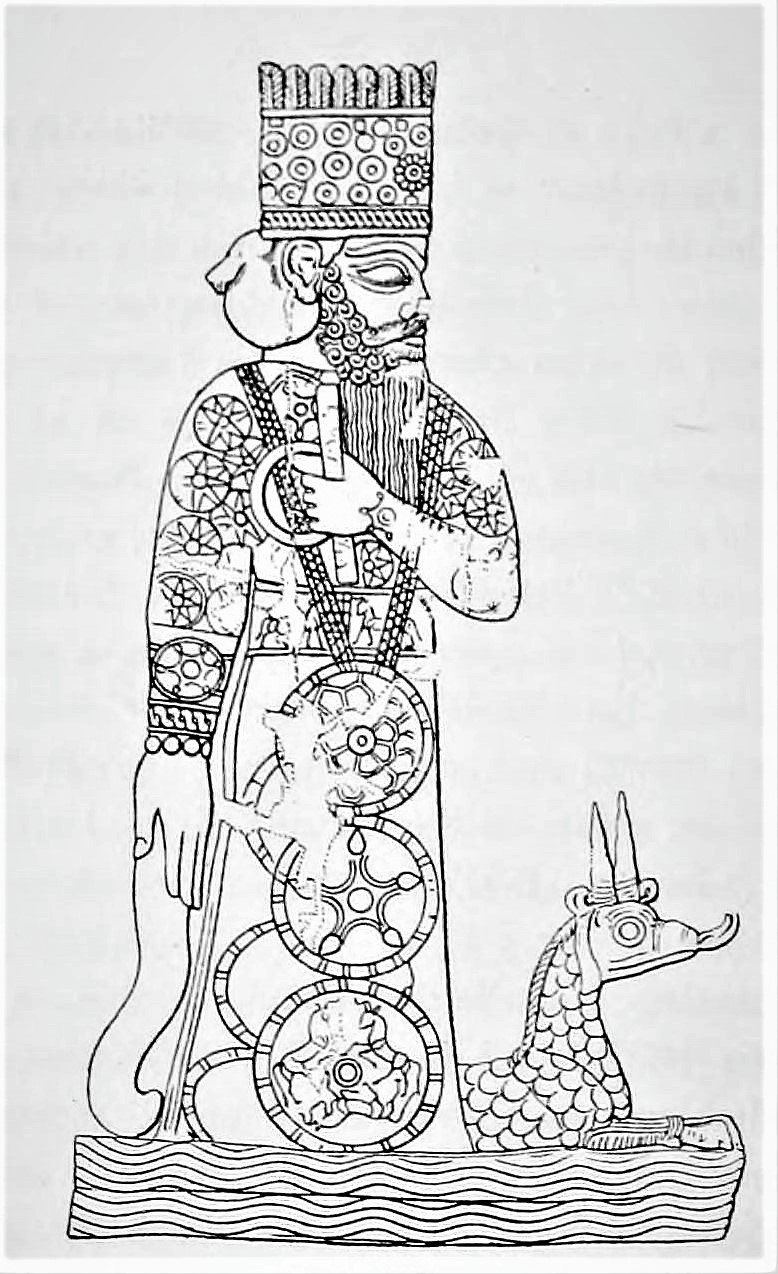
9th-century BC depiction from a cylinder seal of the Statue of Marduk, Babylon's patron deity Marduk's main cult image in the city

Babylon, like the rest of ancient Mesopotamia, followed the Ancient Mesopotamian religion, wherein there was a general accepted hierarchy and dynasty of gods and localized gods who acted as patron deities for specific cities. Marduk was the patron deity of the city Babylon, having held this position since the reign of Hammurabi (18th century BC) in Babylon's first dynasty. Although Babylonian worship of Marduk never meant the denial of the existence of the other gods in the Mesopotamian pantheon, it has sometimes been compared to monotheism. The history of worship of Marduk is intimately tied to the history of Babylon itself and as Babylon's power increased, so did the position of Marduk relative to that of other Mesopotamian gods. By the end of the 2nd millennium BC, Marduk was sometimes just referred to as Bêl, meaning 'lord'.

In Mesopotamian religion, Marduk was a creator god. Going by the Enûma Eliš, the Babylonian creation myth, Marduk was the son of Enki, the Mesopotamian god of wisdom, and rose to prominence during a great battle between the gods. The myth tells how the universe originated as a chaotic realm of water, in which there originally were two primordial deities; Tiamat (salt water, female) and Abzu (sweet water, male). These two gods gave birth to other deities. These deities (including gods such as Enki) had little to do in these early stages of existence and as such occupied themselves with various activities.

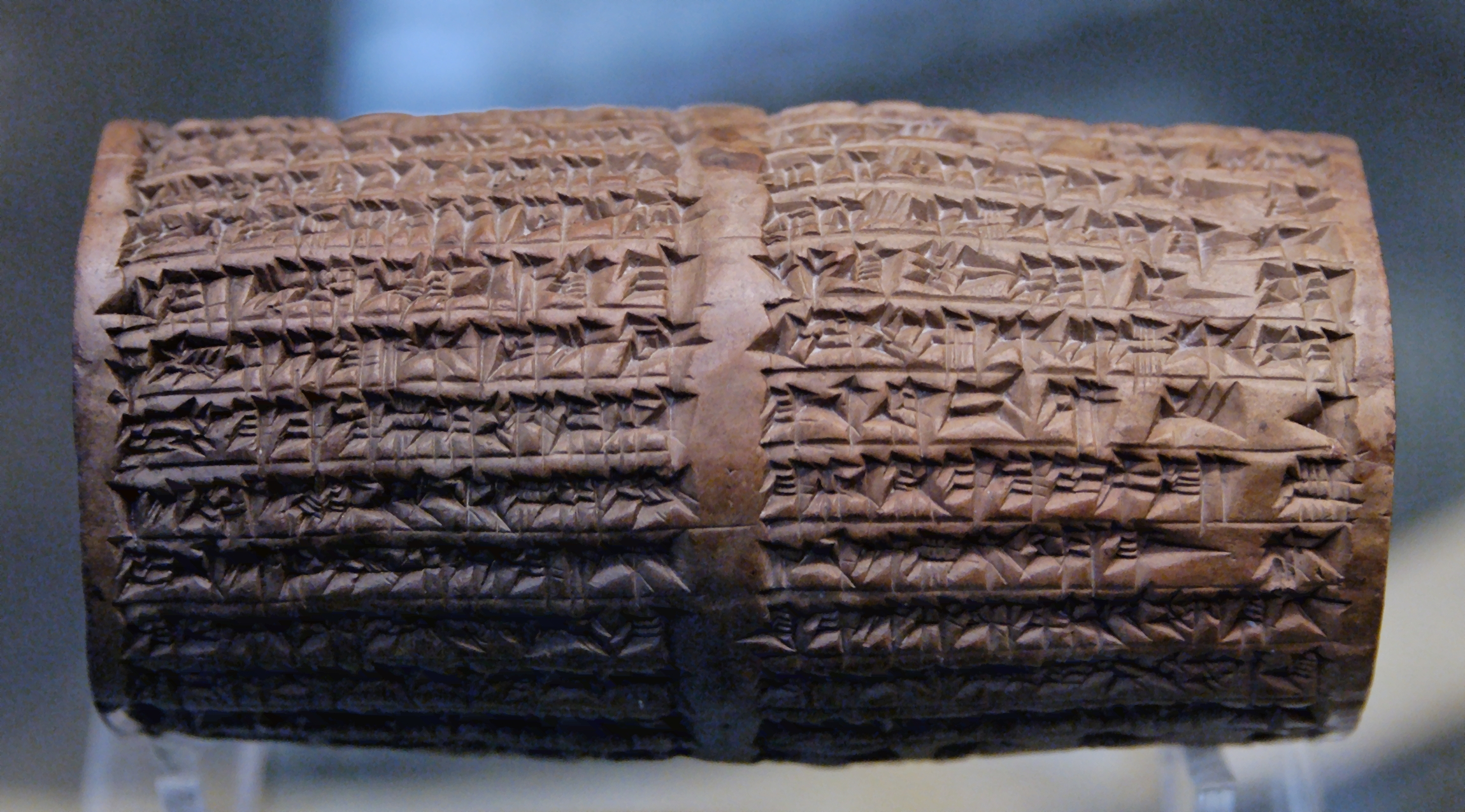
Cylinder by Nabonidus, commemorating restoration work done on a temple dedicated to the god Sîn in Ur. Exhibited at the British Museum.

Eventually, their children began to annoy the elder gods and Abzu decided to rid himself of them by killing them. Alarmed by this, Tiamat revealed Abzu's plan to Enki, who killed his father before the plot could be enacted. Although Tiamat had revealed the plot to Enki to warn him, the death of Abzu horrified her and she too attempted to kill her children, raising an army together with her new consort Kingu. Every battle in the war was a victory for Tiamat until Marduk convinced the other gods to proclaim him as their leader and king. The gods agreed, and Marduk was victorious, capturing and executing Kingu and firing a great arrow at Tiamat, killing her and splitting her in two. With these chaotic primordial forces defeated, Marduk created the world and ordered the heavens. Marduk is also described as the creator of human beings, which were meant to help the gods in defeating and holding off the forces of chaos and thus maintain order on Earth.

The Statue of Marduk was the physical representation of Marduk housed in Babylon's main temple, the Esagila. Although Babylon had seven separate statues of Marduk (four in the Esagila, one in the Etemenanki, the ziggurat dedicated to Marduk, and two in temples dedicated to other deities), the phrase “the statue of Marduk” usually refers to his primary statue, placed prominently in the Esagila and used in the city's rituals.

The Babylonians themselves conflated the statue with the actual god Marduk – the god was understood as living in the temple, among the people of his city, and not in the heavens. As such, Marduk was not seen as some distant entity, but a friend and protector who lived nearby. This was no different from other Mesopotamian cities, who similarly conflated their gods with the representations used for them in their temples. During Babylon's religiously significant New Year's festival, the statue was carried through the city and set in a smaller building outside the walls, where it gained fresh air and a view unlike that inside the temple. During the New Year's festival, the statue formed part of the coronation rites for the Babylonian kings, who were given the Babylonian crown "out of the hands" of Marduk, signifying that the city's patron deity had conferred kingship upon them.

The temples of southern Mesopotamia were important as both religious and economic centers. The temples were chiefly institutions for caring for the gods and for conducting various rituals. Because of their religious significance, temples were present in all major cities, with trade and population growth being stimulated by the presence of a temple. Workers within the temples had to be "fit" for service and were not slaves or temple dependents (unlike those who served the temples by cultivating food and other supplies). These temple workers, who created the clothes used by the deity's cult, cleaned and moved around the statues of the deities, maintained the rooms within the temple and performed the important rituals, represented the skilled and free urban elite of Babylonian society and were paid through leftovers from meals intended for the gods, barley and beer.

=== Justice ===
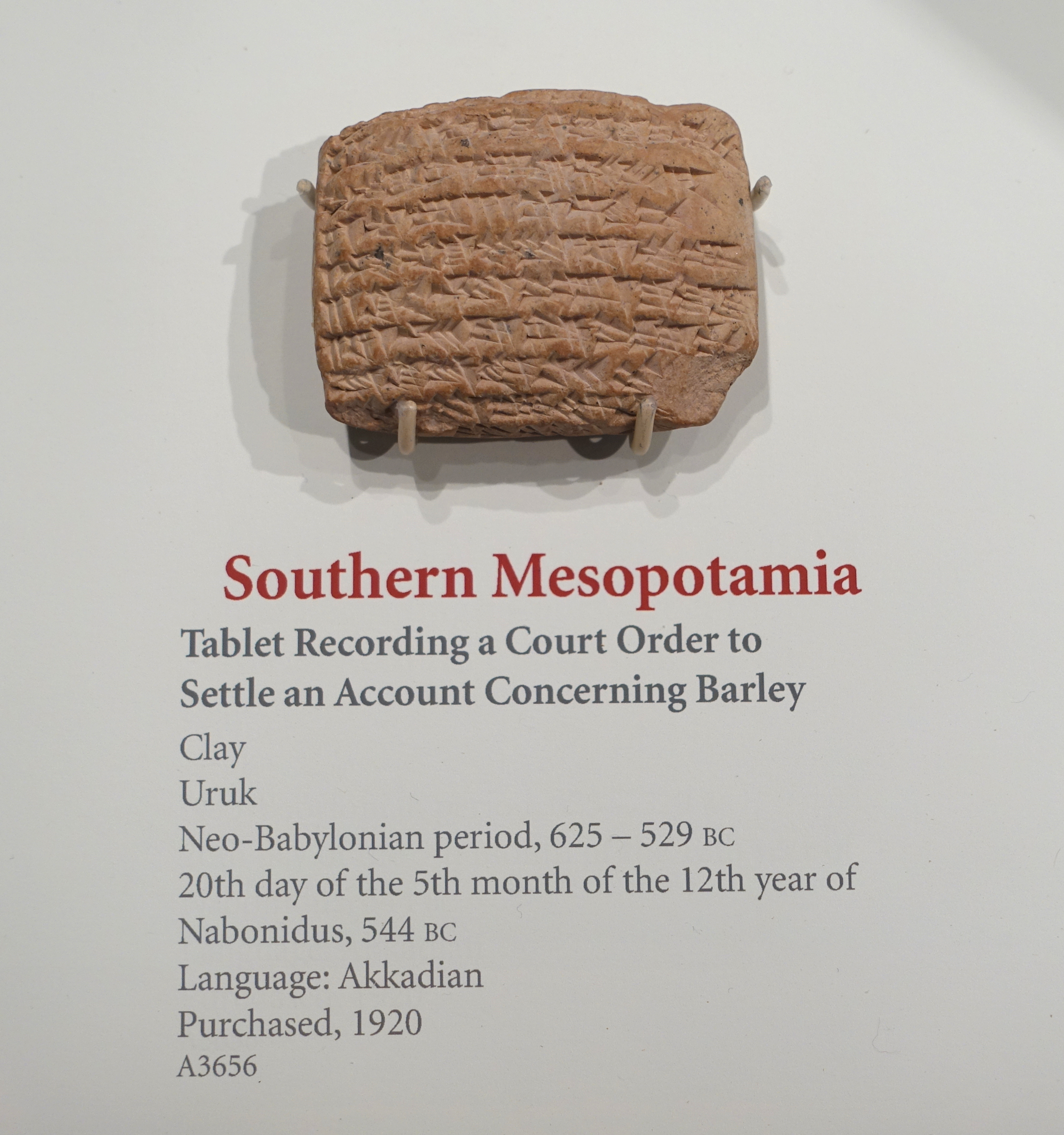
Tablet concerning a legal dispute over barley, from Uruk and dated to the reign of Nabonidus (544 BC). Exhibited at the Oriental Institute of the University of Chicago.

The surviving sources suggest that the justice system of the Neo-Babylonian Empire had changed little from the one which functioned during the Old Babylonian Empire a thousand years prior. Throughout Babylonia, there were local assemblies (called puhru) of elders and other notables from society which among other local roles served as local courts of justice (though there were also higher "royal" and "temple courts" with greater legal prerogatives). In these courts, judges would be assisted by scribes and several of the local courts would be headed by royal representatives, usually titled sartennu or šukallu.

For the most part, surviving sources related to the Neo-Babylonian justice system are tablets containing letters and lawsuits. These tablets document various legal disputes and crimes, such as embezzlement, disputes over property, theft, family affairs, debts and inheritance and often offer considerable insight into daily life in the Neo-Babylonian Empire. The punishment for these types of crimes and disputes appears, for the most part, to have been money-related, with the guilty party paying a specified amount of silver as compensation. Crimes such as adultery and lèse-majesté were apparently punishable by death, but little surviving evidence exists for the death penalty actually being carried out.

=== Art ===
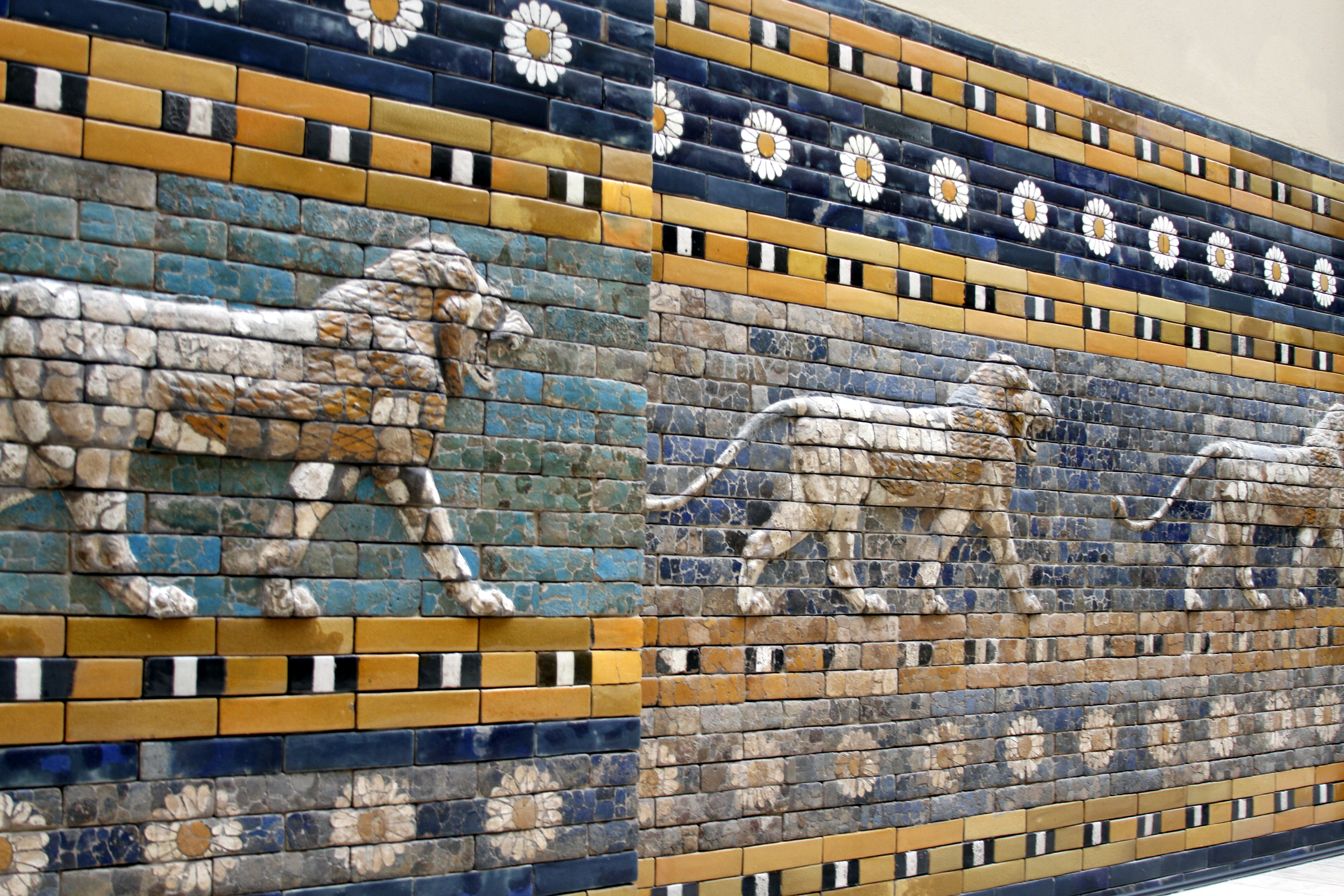
Striding lions from the Processional Street of Babylon. Exhibited at the Pergamon Museum in Berlin.

Artists in the Neo-Babylonian period continued the artistic trends of previous periods, showing similarities with the artwork of the Neo-Assyrian period in particular. Cylinder seals of the period are less detailed than in previous times and shows definite Assyrian influence in the themes depicted. One of the most common scenes depicted in such seals are heroes, sometimes depicted with wings, about to strike beasts with their curved swords. Other common scenes include purification of a sacred tree or mythological animals and creatures. Cylinder seals increasingly fell into disuse over the course of the Neo-Babylonian century, eventually being entirely replaced by stamp seals.

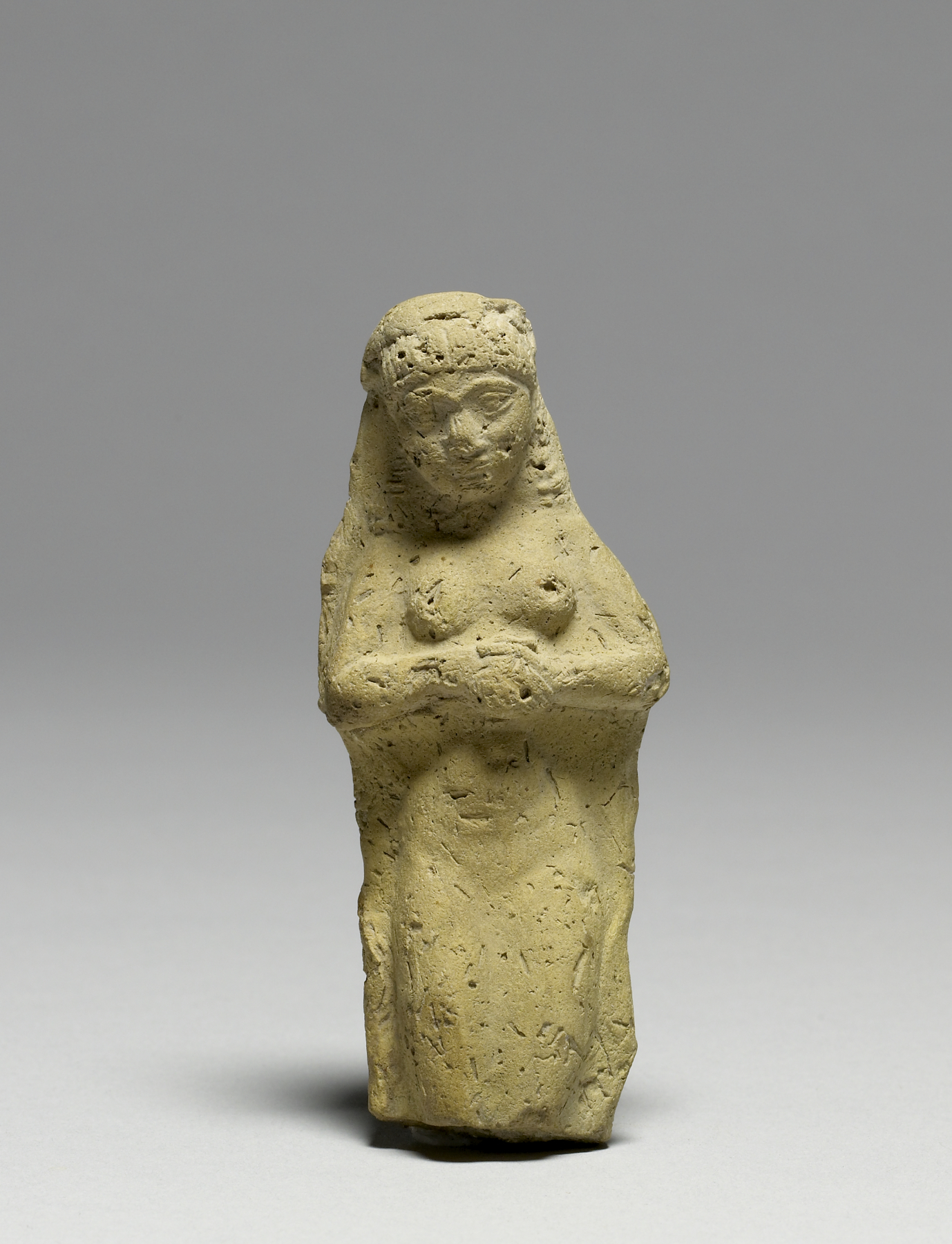
Neo-Babylonian terracotta figurine depicting a nude woman. Exhibited at the Walters Art Museum in Baltimore.

Terracotta figurines and reliefs, made using molds, were common during the Neo-Babylonian Empire. Preserved figurines usually represent protective demons (such as Pazuzu) or deities but there are also examples of horsemen, naked women, boats, men carrying vases and various types of furniture. Terracotta figurines could be sacred objects intended to be kept in people's homes for magical protection or as decorations, but they could also be objects offered to deities in the temples. The technique of colored glaze was improved and perfected by Neo-Babylonian artists. In reliefs, such as the ones on the Ishtar Gate in Babylon and along the city's Processional Street (where parades passed through during religious festivals in the city), colored glaze was combined with bricks molded in various shapes to create decorations in color. Most of these decorations are symbols of lions (associated with the goddess Ishtar) flowers, mušḫuššu (a mythological creature associated with the god Marduk) and oxen (associated with the god Adad).

=== Revival of old traditions ===
After Babylonia regained its independence, Neo-Babylonian rulers were deeply conscious of the antiquity of their kingdom and pursued a highly traditionalist policy, reviving much of the ancient Sumero-Akkadian culture. Even though Aramaic had become the everyday tongue, Akkadian was retained as the language of administration and culture.

Ancient artworks from the heyday of Babylonia's imperial glory were treated with near-religious reverence and were painstakingly preserved. For example, when a statue of Sargon the Great was found during construction work, a temple was built for it, and it was given offerings. The story is told of how Nebuchadnezzar II, in his efforts to restore the Temple at Sippar, had to make repeated excavations until he found the foundation deposit of Naram-Sin of Akkad. The discovery then allowed him to rebuild the temple properly. Neo-Babylonians also revived the ancient Sargonic practice of appointing a royal daughter to serve as priestess of the moon god Sîn.

=== Slavery ===
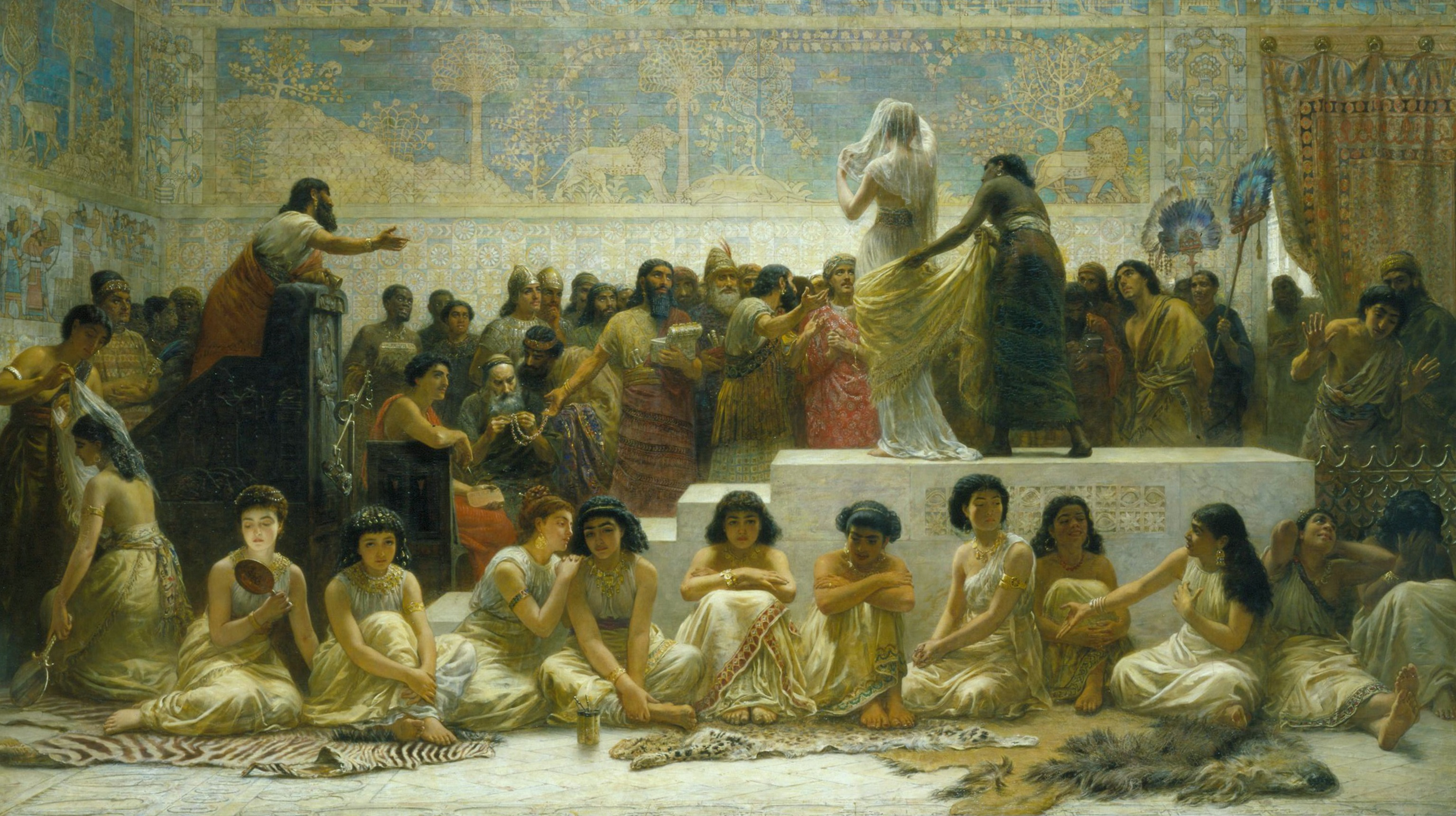
The Babylonian marriage market, painting by Edwin Long (1875)

As in most ancient empires, slaves were an accepted part of Neo-Babylonian society. In contrast to slavery in ancient Rome, where slave-owners often worked their slaves to death at an early age, slaves in the Neo-Babylonian Empire were valuable resources, typically sold for money matching several years of income for a paid worker. Slaves were typically from lands outside of Babylonia, becoming slaves through the slave trade or through being captured in times of war. Slave women were often given as part of a dowry to help daughters of free men and women in their household or in raising children. Slaves were not cheap to maintain as they had to be clothed and fed. Because they were expensive to begin with, many Neo-Babylonian slave-owners trained their slaves in professions to raise their value or rented them out to others. Sometimes slaves who showed good business sense were allowed to serve in trade or through managing part of a family business. Slave families were most often sold as a unit, children only being separated from their parents once they reached adulthood (or working age).

Though slaves probably endured harsh living conditions and poor treatment from others, it would not have been equivalent to the brutal form of slavery in the Roman Empire and in later times. Though there are occasional mentions of slaves escaping, there are no records of slave rebellions in the Neo-Babylonian Empire. Slaves mentioned in connection to farming and agriculture are usually not forced laborers. As farming required diligence and care, slaves at farms were typically given contracts and were allowed to work independently, which would make the slaves more interested in the result of their labor. Some slaves acted as proxies or junior partners of their masters. Slaves were also allowed to pay a fee called the mandattu to their masters, which allowed them to work and live independently, essentially "renting" themselves from their master. There are records of slaves paying the mandattu for themselves and for their wives so that they could live freely. There are, however, no records of slaves completely buying their freedom, Babylonian slaves could only be freed by their masters.

== Economy ==
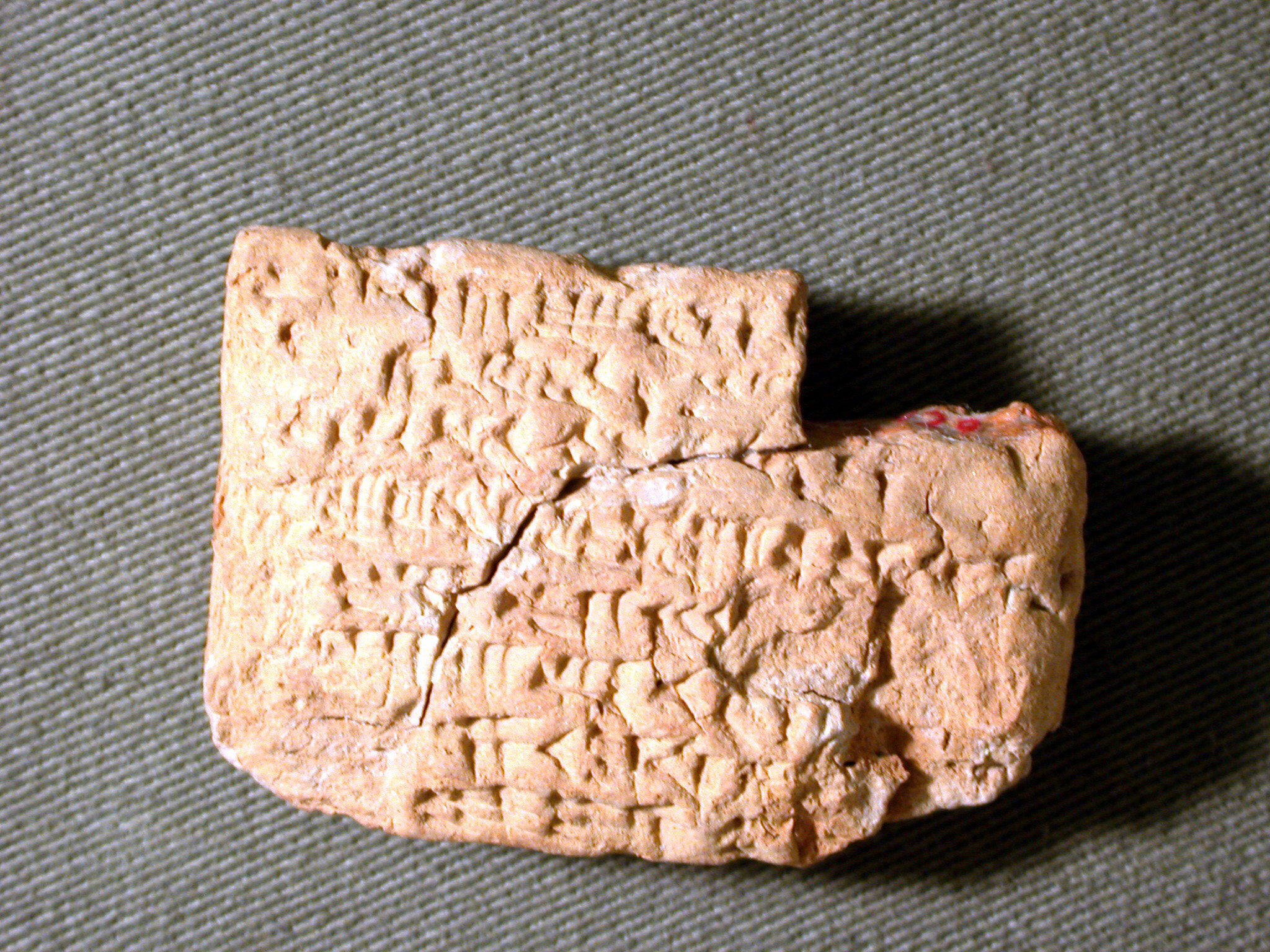
Tablet recording a silver payment from the temple dedicated to the god Shamash in Sippar, written during the reign of Nebuchadnezzar II. Exhibited at the Metropolitan Museum of Art

The establishment of the Neo-Babylonian Empire meant that for the first time since the Assyrian conquest, tribute flowed into Babylonia rather than being drained from it. This reversal, combined with building projects and the relocation of subjugated peoples stimulated both population and economic growth in the region.

Although the soil in Mesopotamia was fertile, the average rainfall in the region was not enough to sustain regular crops. As such, water had to be drawn from the two major rivers, the Euphrates and the Tigris, for use in irrigation. These rivers tended to flood at inconvenient times, such as at grain harvest time. To solve these issues and allow for efficient farming, Mesopotamia required a sophisticated large-scale system of canals, dams and dikes, both to protect from floods and to supply water. These structures required constant maintenance and supervision to function. Digging and maintaining the canals was seen as a royal task and the resources required to construct and maintain the infrastructure necessary, and the manpower itself, was provided by the many temples which dotted the region.

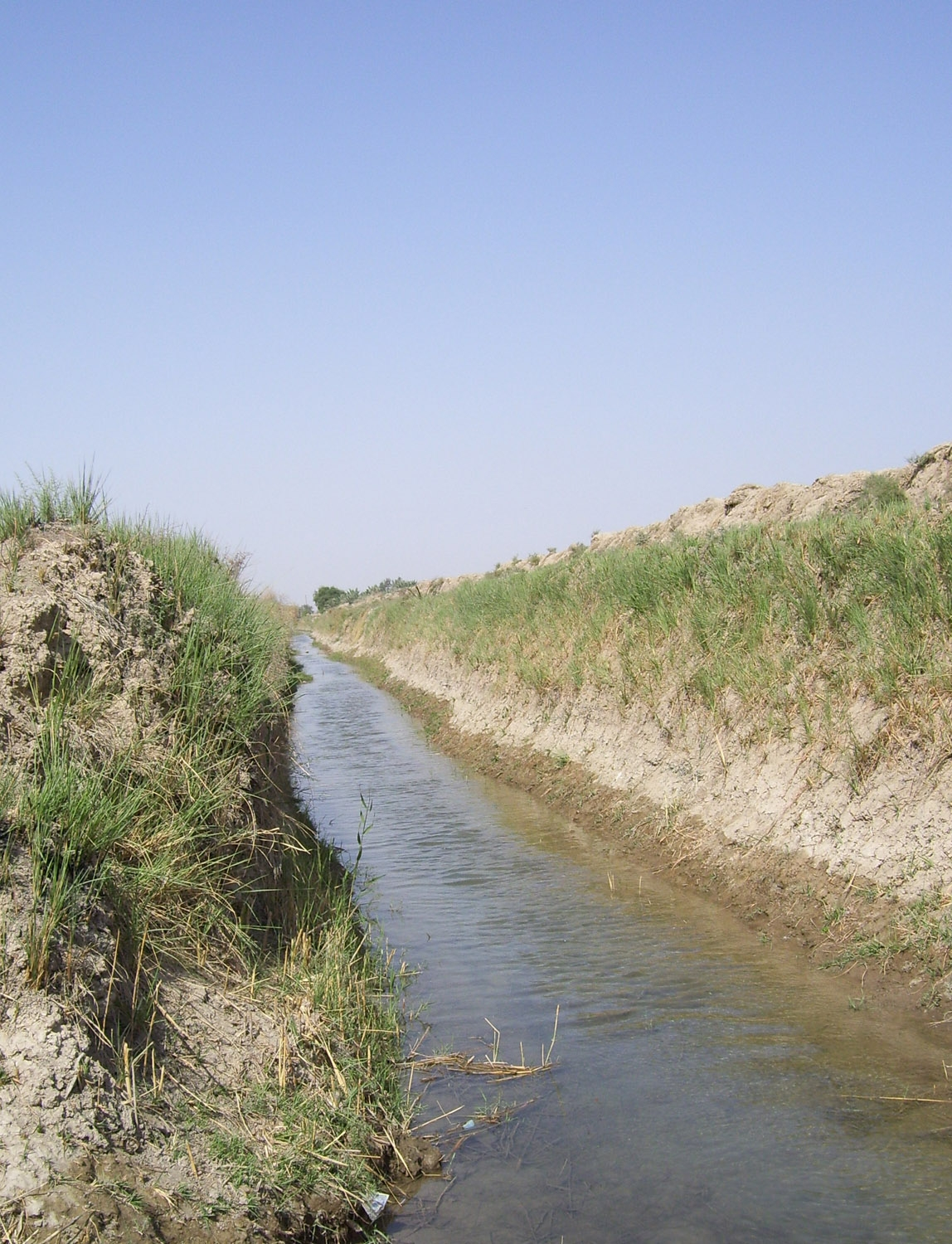
Irrigation canal from modern-day Iraq, near Baghdad

The most detailed economical records from Neo-Babylonian times are from these temples. The people who cultivated the temple lands of Babylonia were mostly unfree personnel, so-called temple dependents (širāku), which were usually given larger work assignments than they could accomplish. In later times, to increase productivity, the temples began hiring "rent farmers". These rent farmers were given a portion or all of a temple's farming grounds and fields, including the temple dependents and equipment there, in exchange for money and a fixed quota of commodities to supply to the temple. Rent farmers were personally liable for accidents and falling short of the quota and there are many records of rent farmers giving up or sometimes being required to sell their own possessions and assets to the temple as compensation.

Although animal husbandry was practiced throughout Mesopotamia, it was the most common form of farming in the south. In Uruk, animals, rather than some type of plant, were the main cash crop. Shepherds could be temple dependents or independent contractors and were entrusted with herds of either sheep or goats. Similar to other farmers working in connection to the temples, these shepherds had a set quota of lambs to provide for sacrificial purposes, with wool and hides also being used in the temples for various purposes. Dairy products were less important since the animals would be unavailable for most of the year as the shepherds drove them across the land. Cows and oxen, rare in Mesopotamia due to being difficult to feed and maintain through the summer months, were mainly used as draft animals for plowing. Regions with a swampy environment, unsuited for farming, were used to hunt birds and fish.

The most common form of business partnership recorded from Neo-Babylonian sources is called the harrānu, which involved a senior financing partner and a junior working partner (who did all the work, using the money provided by the senior partner). Profit from such business ventures were divided equally between the two partners. The idea allowed rich individuals to use their money to finance businesses by capable individuals who might not otherwise have had the means to carry out their trade (for instance second sons who had not inherited as much money as first-born sons). Records show that some junior partners worked their way up through their businesses to eventually become senior partners in new harrānu arrangements.

The Neo-Babylonian period saw marked population growth in Babylonia, with the number of known settlements increasing from the previous 134 to the Neo-Babylonian 182, with the average size of these settlements also increasing. This population growth was probably because of increasing prosperity in Babylonia, combined with the resettlement of subjugated peoples and the possible return of peoples that had been resettled under the Neo-Assyrian Empire. The Neo-Babylonian period also saw a dramatic increase in urbanization, reversing a trend of ruralization which southern Mesopotamia had experienced since the fall of the Old Babylonian Empire.

== Government and military ==
=== Administration and extent ===
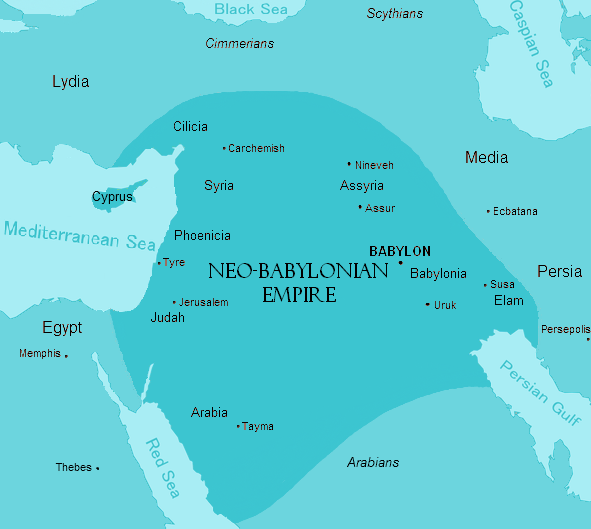
Approximate borders of the Neo-Babylonian Empire (dark turquoise) and neighboring states in the 6th century BC

At the top of the Neo-Babylonian Empire social ladder was the king (šar); his subjects took an oath of loyalty called the ade to him, a tradition inherited from the Neo-Assyrian Empire. The Neo-Babylonian kings used the titles King of Babylon and King of Sumer and Akkad. They abandoned many of the boastful Neo-Assyrian titles that claimed universal rule (though some of these would be reintroduced under Nabonidus), possibly because the Assyrians had been resented by the Babylonians as impious and warlike and the Neo-Babylonian kings preferred to present themselves as devout kings.

The king was also the single most important landowner within the empire, with there being several large swaths of land placed under direct royal control throughout Babylonia. There were also large domains placed under other members of the royal family (for instance, there are mentions of a "house of the crown prince" distinct from the "house of the king" in inscriptions) and under other high officials (such as the royal treasurer).

The exact administrative structure of the Neo-Babylonian Empire and its government remains somewhat unclear due to a lack of relevant sources. Although the Neo-Babylonian Empire supplanted the Neo-Assyrian Empire as the major Mesopotamian empire of its time, the exact extent to which Babylon inherited and retained the lands of this preceding empire is unknown. After the Fall of Nineveh in 612 BC, the territory of the Neo-Assyrian Empire had been split between Babylon and the Medes, with the Medes being granted the northern Zagros mountains, while Babylon took Transpotamia (the countries west of the Euphrates) and the Levant, but the precise border between the two empires and the degree to which the former Assyrian heartland was divided between them is unknown. Babylonia itself, the heartland of the Neo-Babylonian Empire, was ruled as an intricate network of provinces and tribal regions with varying degrees of autonomy. The administrative structure used outside of this heartland is unknown.

From building inscriptions it is clear that some parts of the heartland of the former Neo-Assyrian Empire were under Babylonian control. A building inscription of Nebuchadnezzar II refers to the workmen responsible for the renovation of the Etemenanki in Babylon as hailing from "the whole of the land of Akkad and the land of Assyria, the kings of Eber-Nāri, the governors of Ḫatti, from the Upper Sea to the Lower Sea". Documents from the reign of Neriglissar confirms the existence of a Babylonian governor in the city Assur, meaning that it was located within the empire's borders. No evidence has yet been found that would place the Neo-Assyrian capital, Nineveh, within the Neo-Babylonian Empire. The empire evidently enjoyed direct rule in Syria, as indicated in Nebuchadnezzar's building inscription ("governors of Hatti", "Hatti" referring to the Syro-Hittite city-states in the region) and other inscriptions referencing a governor in the city Arpad.

Although some scholars have suggested that the Assyrian provincial system collapsed with the fall of the Neo-Assyrian Empire and that the Neo-Babylonian Empire was simply a zone of dominance from which Babylon's kings exacted tribute, it is likely that the Neo-Babylonian Empire retained the provincial system in some capacity. The former Assyrian heartland was probably divided between the Babylonians and the Medes, with the Babylonians incorporating the south into their empire and the Medes gaining the north. It is probable that the actual control Babylon held over these territories was variable. After Assyria's collapse, many of the coastal cities and states in the Levant regained independence, but were placed under Babylonian rule as vassal kingdoms (rather than incorporated provinces).

=== Military ===
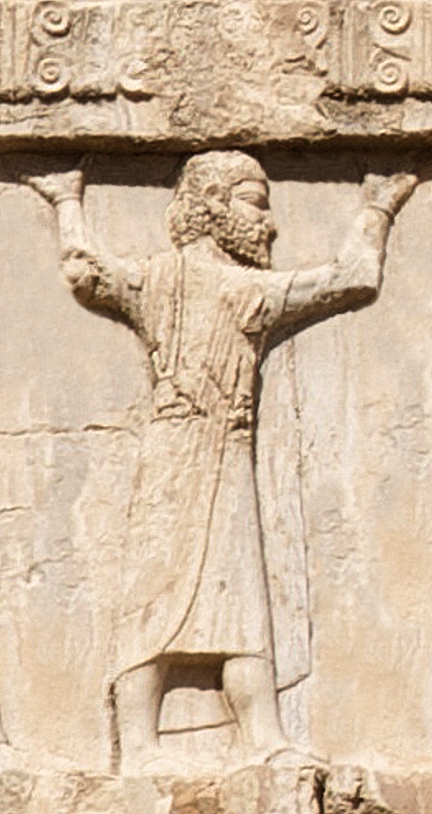
Babylonian soldier as represented on the tomb of the Achaemenid king Xerxes I, c. 480 BC.

For the Neo-Babylonian kings, war was a means to obtain tribute, plunder (in particular sought after materials such as various metals and quality wood) and prisoners of war which could be put to work as slaves in the temples. Like their predecessors, the Assyrians, the Neo-Babylonian kings also used deportation as a means of control. The Assyrians had displaced populations throughout their vast empire, but the practice under the Babylonian kings seems to have been more limited, only being used to establish new populations in Babylonia itself. Though royal inscriptions from the Neo-Babylonian period don't speak of acts of destruction and deportation in the same boastful way royal inscriptions from the Neo-Assyrian period do, this does not prove that the practice ceased or that the Babylonians were less brutal than the Assyrians. There is for instance evidence that the city Ashkelon was destroyed by Nebuchadnezzar II in 604 BC.

The troops of the Neo-Babylonian Empire would have been supplied by all parts of its complex administrative structure – from the various cities of Babylonia, from the provinces in Syria and Assyria, from the tribal confederations under Babylonian rule and from the various client kingdoms and city-states in the Levant. The most detailed sources preserved from the Neo-Babylonian period concerning the army are from the temples, which supplied a portion of the temple dependents (called širāku) as soldiers in times of war. These dependents were mostly farmers (ikkaru) but some were also shepherds, gardeners and craftsmen. The vast majority of these levies from the temples served in the army as archers, equipped with bows, arrows (each archer was supplied with 40–60 arrows), bow-cases and daggers. The bows, made in both distinct Akkadian and Cimmerian styles, were manufactured and repaired at the temples by trained bowmakers and arrows and daggers were made by temple smiths. Socketed bronze arrowheads, originally of steppe origin, first appear in the Levant in destruction layers associated with Nebuchadnezzar II's conquest of the Kingdom of Judah, suggesting that steppe nomads served as mercenaries in the Babylonian army and/or that the Babylonians had adopted the arrowhead type themselves at this time. Inscriptions from the Ebabbara temple in Sippar suggests that temples could field as many as 14% of their dependents in times of crisis (for the Ebabbara this would account for 180 soldiers), but that the number was usually much lower (with the most common number of soldiers supplied by the Ebabbara being 50 soldiers). The archers fielded by these temples were divided into contingents or decuries (ešertu) by profession, each led by a commander (rab eširti). These commanders were in turn under the command of the rab qašti, who answered to the qīpu (a local high official). Cavalry and chariots were also supplied by the temples, but there are few known inscriptions detailing their equipment, relative number or leadership structure.

The citizens of the cities in Babylonia were obliged to perform military service, often as archers, as a civil duty. These citizen militias were, just like the archers raised by the temples, divided and organized by profession. Citizens who served as soldiers were paid in silver, probably at a rate of 1 mina per year. The Neo-Babylonian army is also likely to have bolstered its numbers through conscripting soldiers from the tribal confederacies within the empire's territory and through hiring mercenaries (the presence of Greek mercenaries in the army of Nebuchadnezzar II is known from a poem). In times of war, the entire Babylonian army would have been assembled by an official called the dēkû ('mobilizer') sending word to the many rab qašti, who then organized all the ešertu. Soldiers on campaigns (which could last anywhere from three months to a full year) were supplied with rations (including barley and sheep), silver as payment, salt, oil and water bottles and were also equipped with blankets, tents, sacks, shoes, jerkins and donkeys or horses.

== Architecture ==
=== Monumental architecture ===
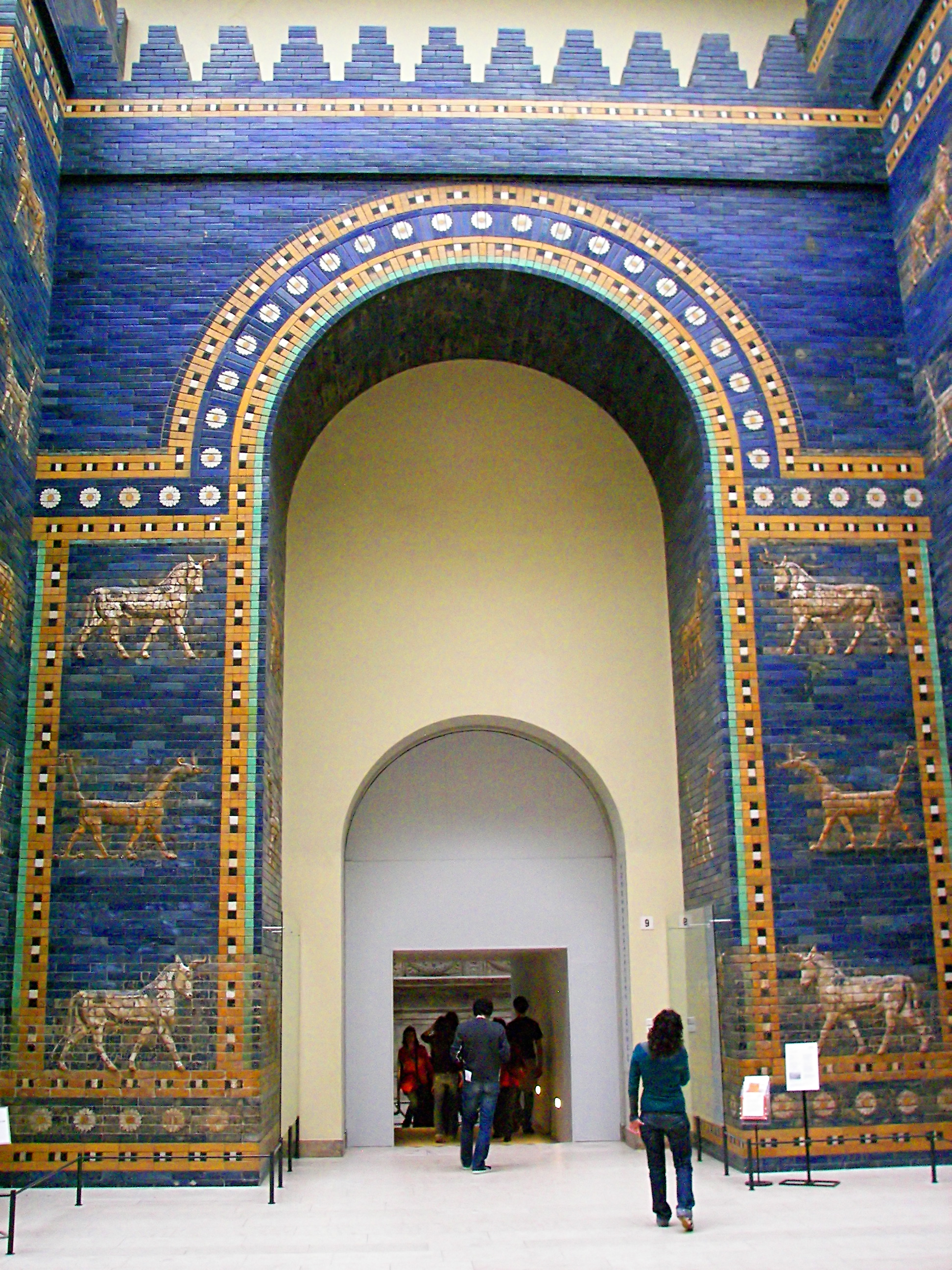
The Ishtar Gate, one of Babylon's eight inner city gates, was constructed by King Nebuchadnezzar II c. 575 BC. The reconstructed gate is exhibited at the Pergamon Museum in Berlin.

Monumental architecture encompasses building works such as temples, palaces, ziggurats (a massive structure with religious connections, composed of a massive stepped tower with a shrine on top), city walls, processional streets, artificial waterways and cross-country defensive structures. The Babylonian king was traditionally a builder and restorer, and as such large-scale building projects were important as a legitimizing factor for Babylonian rulers. Due to the interests of early excavators of the ancient cities in Babylonia, most of the archaeological knowledge regarding the Neo-Babylonian Empire is related to the vast monumental buildings that were located in the hearts of Babylonia's major cities. This early bias has resulted in that the makeup of the cities themselves (such as residential areas) and the structure of smaller settlements remains under-researched.

Although inscriptions discuss the presence of royal palaces at several cities throughout southern Mesopotamia, the only Neo-Babylonian royal palaces yet found and excavated are those in Babylon itself. The South Palace, occupying a corner formed by the city wall to the north and the Euphrates to the west, was built under kings Nabopolassar and Nebuchadnezzar II and was composed of five units, each with its own courtyard. The central of these units housed the residential suites and the actual throne room whilst the other units were for administrative and storage purposes. The palace adjoined the central Processional Street on its eastern side and was heavily fortified at its western side (the side facing the Euphrates).

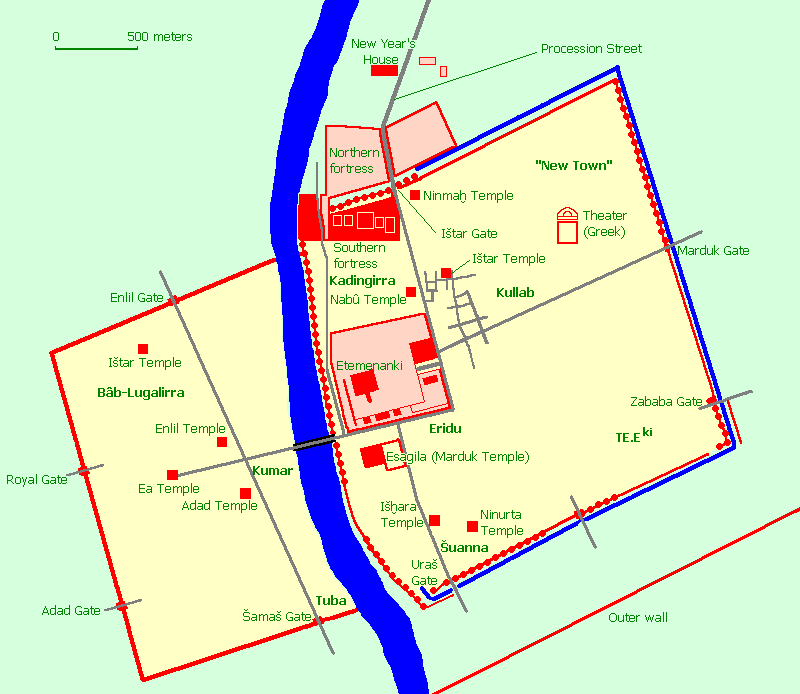
City plan of Babylon, showcasing the locations of major points of interest. The outer walls and the northern Summer Palace are not shown.

Nebuchadnezzar II also built a second palace, the North Palace, on the other side of the inner city wall. This palace also adjoined the Processional Street on its eastern side, but its ruins are poorly preserved and as such its structure and appearance are not entirely understood. There was also a third royal palace in the city, the Summer Palace, built some distance north of the inner city walls in the northernmost corner of the outer walls (also constructed by Nebuchadnezzar II). Non-royal palaces, such as the palace of a local governor at Ur, share design features with Babylon's South Palace but were considerably smaller in size.

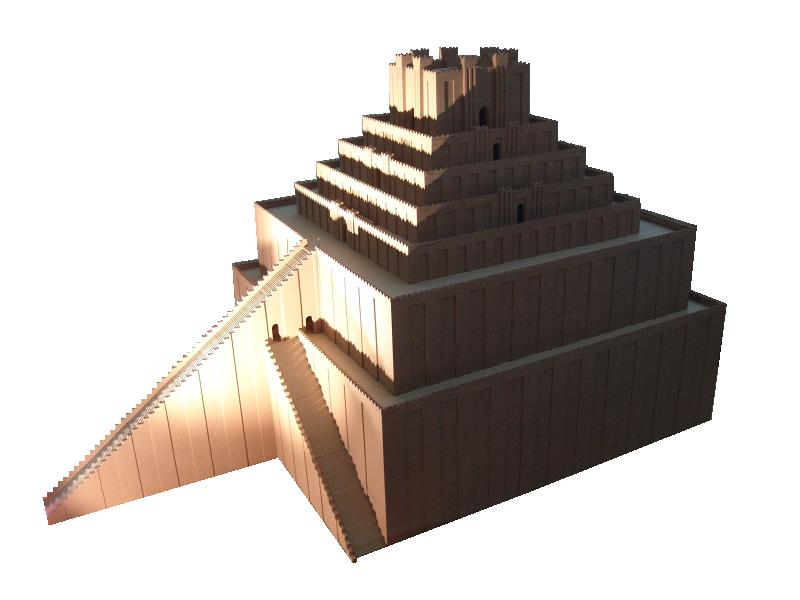
Reconstruction of the Etemenanki, Babylon's great ziggurat.

The temples of the Neo-Babylonian Empire are divided into two categories by archaeologists; smaller freestanding temples scattered throughout a city (often in residential quarters) and the large main temples of a city, dedicated to that city's patron deity and often located within its own set of walls. In most cities, the ziggurat was located within the temple complex but the ziggurat in Babylon, called the Etemenanki, had its own complex and set of walls separate from those of the city's main temple, the Esagila. Neo-Babylonian temples combined features of palaces and residential houses. They had a central courtyard, completely enclosed on all sides, with the principal room, dedicated to the deity, often being located towards the south and the temple's entrance being located on the side opposite to this principal room. Some temples, such as Babylon's Ninurta temple, had a single courtyard, while others, such as Babylon's Išḫara temple, had smaller courtyards in addition to the main courtyard.

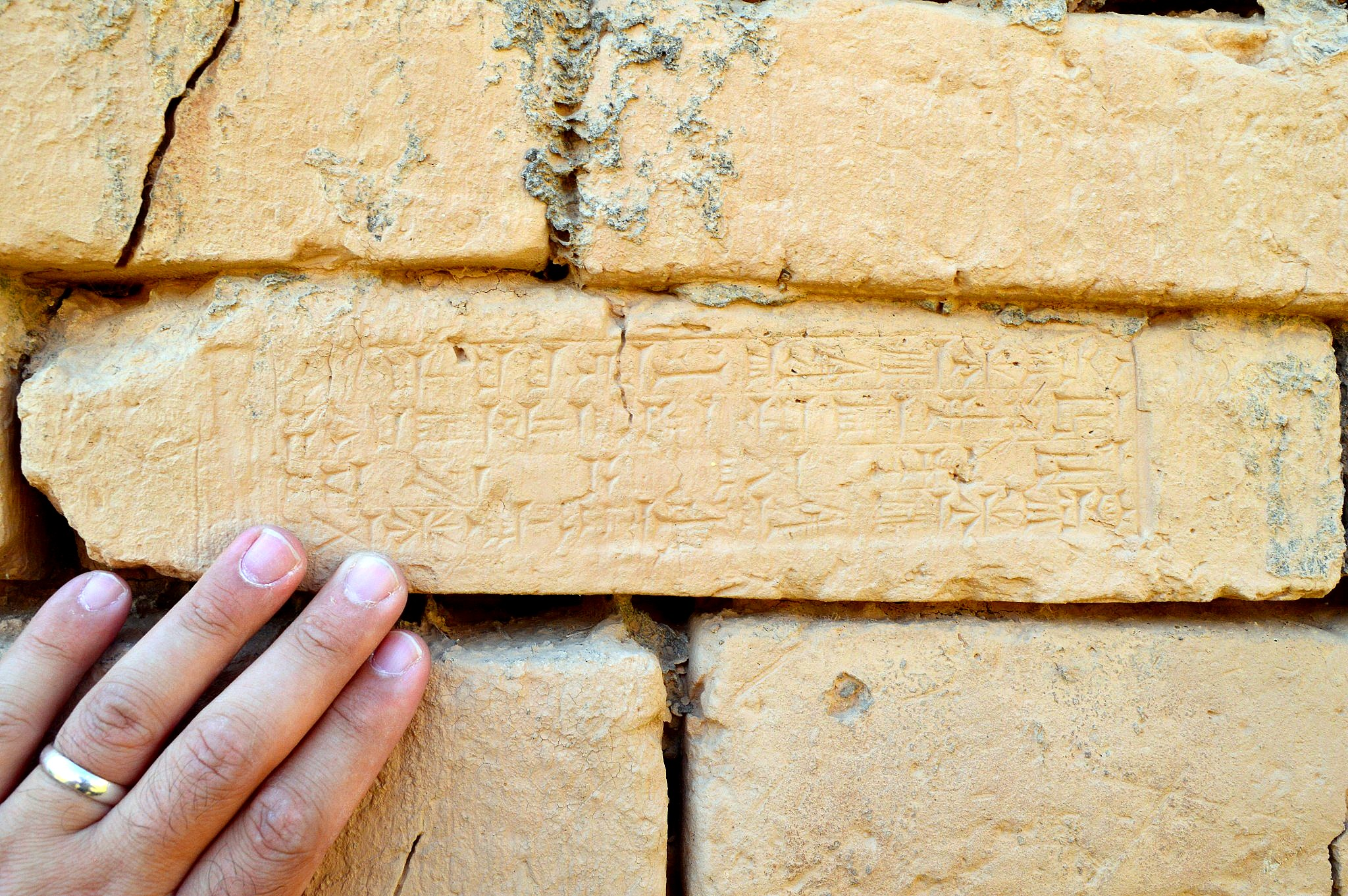
Mud-brick from the Processional Street of Babylon stamped with the name of Nebuchadnezzar II.

Though many processional streets are described in inscriptions from the Neo-Babylonian period, the only such street excavated yet is the main Processional Street of Babylon. This street ran along the eastern walls of the South Palace and exited the inner city walls at the Ishtar Gate, running past the North Palace. To the south, this street went by the Etemenanki, turning to the west and going over a bridge constructed either under the reign of Nabopolassar or Nebuchadnezzar II. Some of the bricks of the Processional Street bear the name of the Neo-Assyrian king Sennacherib on their underside, suggesting that construction of the street had begun already during his reign, but the fact that the upper side of the bricks all bear the name of Nebuchadnezzar II, suggesting that construction of the street had been completed during his reign.

Nebuchadnezzar II also constructed two great cross-country walls, built with baked brick, to aid in Babylonia's defense. The only one of the two have been confidently located is known as the Habl al-Shar and stretched from Euphrates to the Tigris at the point the two rivers were the closest, some distance north of the city Sippar. The other wall, as of yet not found, was located to the east near the city Kish. Nebuchadnezzar focused his defensive building projects on northern Babylonia, believing this region to be the most likely point of attack for his enemies, and also rebuilt the walls of northern cities such as Kish, Borsippa and Babylon itself while leaving the walls of southern cities, such as Ur and Uruk, as they were.

=== Domestic architecture ===
Typical residential houses from the Neo-Babylonian period were composed of a central unroofed courtyard surrounded on all four sides by suites of rooms. Some larger houses contained two or (rarely, in exceptionally large houses) three courtyards. Each of the sides of the courtyard had a central door, leading into the main room of each side, from which one could access the other smaller rooms of the houses. Most houses appear to have been oriented from the southeast to the northwest, with the main living area (the largest room) being located at the southeastern side. The exterior walls of houses were unadorned, blank and windowless. The main entrance was typically located on the end of the house furthest away from the main living area. Houses of people of higher status were generally free-standing, while houses of lower status could share an outer wall with a neighboring house.

Houses in the Neo-Babylonian period were constructed mostly of sundried mudbrick. Baked bricks, such as the ones used in Nebuchadnezzar's great walls, were used for certain parts, such as the paving in rooms which were to be exposed to water and in the courtyard. Roofs were composed of straw-tempered mud overlaying reeds or reed matting, which in turn overlaid local timbers.

== See also ==
- History of Mesopotamia
- Akkadian Empire
- Third Dynasty of Ur
- Superpower
