= Gobryas (general) =

Cyrus the Great's general

According to the Cyropedia of Xenophon, Gobryas (Ancient Greek: Γοβρύας; Old Persian: 𐎥𐎢𐎲𐎽𐎢𐎺 g-u-b-ru-u-v, reads as Gaub(a)ruva?; Elamite: Kambarma) was a Persian general who helped Cyrus II in the conquering of Babylon in 539 BC.

Old Testament scholar Robert Dick Wilson argued that Darius the Mede might be identified as Gobryas, drawing upon the work of Theophilus Pinches. George Frederick Wright championed the view of Wilson in his Scientific Confirmation of Old Testament History.
