= Chaldean dynasty =

Kings of Babylon, 626 BC – 539 BC

- Royal family
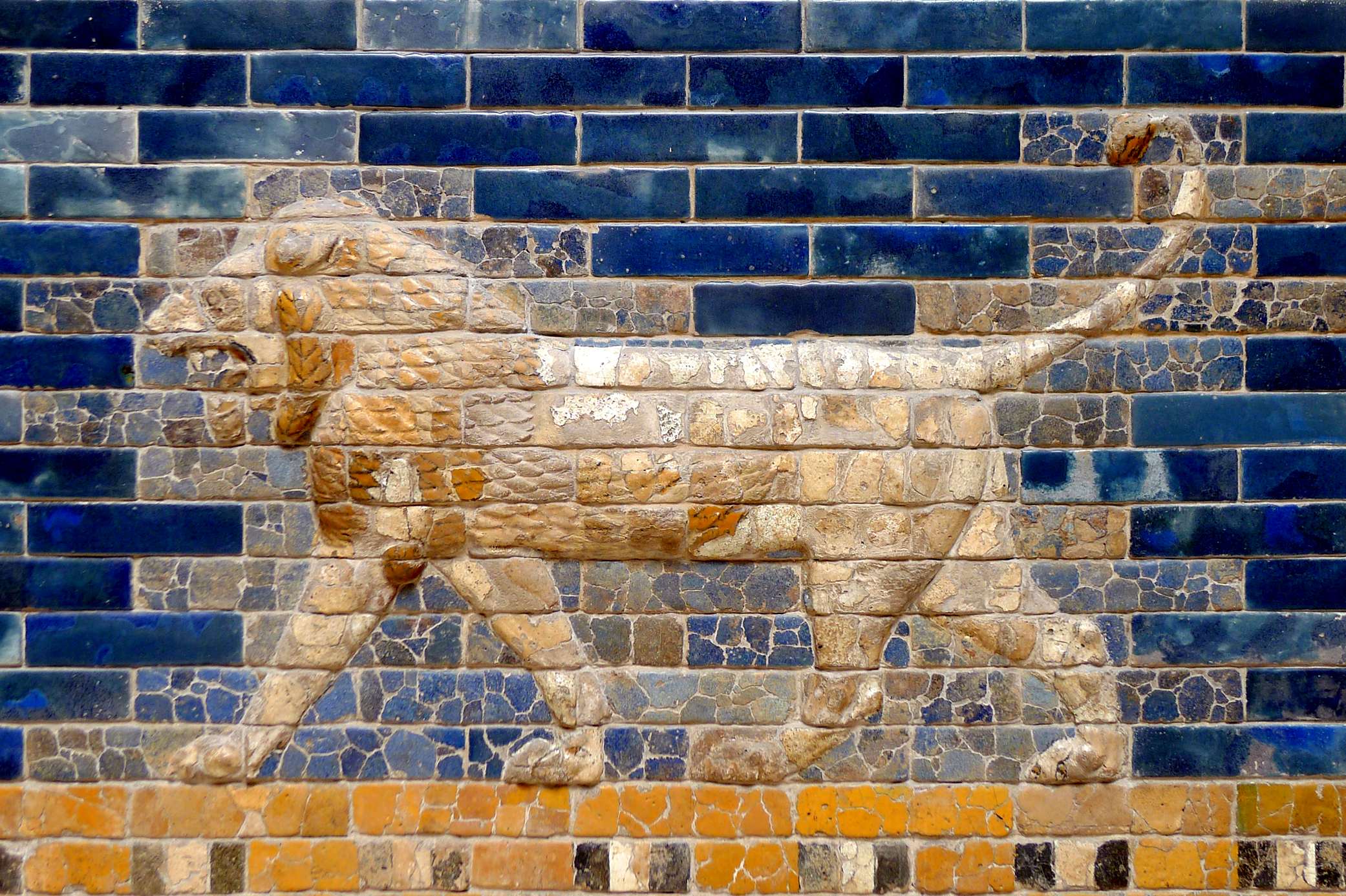
- A lion, as depicted in reliefs on the Ishtar Gate, of Babylon's Procession Street (Note: The striding lion, with its tail curved upwards, was prominently used as a royal symbol during the Neo-Babylonian Empire, appearing on a large number of bricks, seals and contracts. Such lions were also, together with other animals, prominently used in the reliefs of Babylon's Procession Street. The symbol was also used to denote royal property, with objects belonging to the king being marked with a striding lion, together with a short inscription naming the king.)
- Country: Babylonia
- Founded: 626 BC
- Founder: Nabopolassar
- Final ruler: Amēl-Marduk or Labashi-Marduk (bloodline); Nabonidus (through marriage?)
- Titles: King of Babylon; King of Sumer and Akkad; King of the Universe
- Traditions: Ancient Mesopotamian religion
- Deposition: 560 or 556 BC

The Chaldean dynasty, also known as the Neo-Babylonian dynasty (Note: The native name of this dynasty is not preserved in any sources and thus several alternate names have been used by historians. In addition to the 'Chaldean dynasty' and 'Neo-Babylonian dynasty', other names historically used by some scholars include 'Nebuchadnezzar's dynasty', the 'Bit-Yakin dynasty' and the 'Third Sealand dynasty'. The Bit-Yakin were a powerful Chaldean tribe in southern Babylonia. Though there is no evidence that connects them to the Chaldean dynasty, the tribe had supplied Babylonian kings previously, such as Marduk-apla-iddina II (r. 722–710 BC and 703 BC).) and enumerated as Dynasty X of Babylon, (Note: The numerical designation XI, rather than X, was often used in older scholarship, when the king Nabu-mukin-apli (r. c. 978–943 BC) was mistakenly ascribed to a dynasty of his own, rather than to the dynasty of E (Dynasty VIII).) was the ruling dynasty of the Neo-Babylonian Empire, ruling as kings of Babylon from the ascent of Nabopolassar in 626 BC until 556 BC. The descendants of Nabopolasser were deposed in 560 BC by the Aramean official Neriglissar (r. 560–556 BC), son-in-law of Nebuchadnezzar II. Following Neriglissar's reign, his son Labashi-Marduk (r. 556 BC), assumed the throne for about three months according to the Uruk King List. The final Neo-Babylonian king, Nabonidus (r. 556–539 BC), was genealogically unconnected to the Chaldean dynasty. (Note: Nabonidus' father was a mysterious figure named Nabu-balatsu-iqbi and his mother was Adad-guppi, whose inscriptions call Nabonidus a member of the Ashurbanipal dynasty. The Book of Daniel calls Nabonidus's son Belshazzar a son and heir of 'Nebuchadnezzar'. Donald Wiseman says this reference could mean that Nabonidus married a daughter of Nebuchadnezzar II, but no sources identify Belshazzar's mother.)

== History ==
The term "Chaldean dynasty", and the corresponding "Chaldean Empire", an alternate historiographical name for the Neo-Babylonian Empire, derives from the assumption that the dynasty's founder, Nabopolassar, was of Chaldean origin. Though contemporary sources suggest an origin in southern Mesopotamia, such as the Uruk prophecy text describing Nabopolassar as a "king of the sea" (i.e. southernmost Babylonia) and a letter from the Assyrian king Sinsharishkun describing him as "of the lower sea" (also southernmost Babylonia), there is no source that ascribes him a specific ethnic origin. Since the Chaldeans lived in southernmost Mesopotamia, many historians have identified Nabopolassar as Chaldean, but others have referred to him as Assyrian or Babylonian.

The issue is compounded by the fact that Nabopolassar never wrote of his ancestry, going as far as identifying himself as a "son of a nobody". This is almost certainly a lie since an actual son of a nobody, i.e. an obscure figure, would have been unable to gather enough influence to become king of Babylon. There is several pieces of evidence that links Nabopolassar and his dynasty to the city of Uruk (which was located south of Babylon), prominently that several of Nabopolassar's descendants lived in the city and that his son and successor, Nebuchadnezzar II, worked as a priest there before becoming king. In 2007, the Assyriologist Michael Jursa identified Nabopolassar as the son of Nebuchadnezzar (or Kudurru), a governor of Uruk who had been appointed by the Neo-Assyrian king Ashurbanipal. This Nebuchadnezzar belonged to a prominent political family in Uruk, which would explain how Nabopolassar could rise to power, and the names of his relatives correspond to names later given to Nabopolassar's descendants, possibly indicating a familial relationship through patronymics. As Nabopolassar spent his reign fighting the Assyrians, calling himself a "son of a nobody" instead of associating himself with a pro-Assyrian governor might have been politically advantageous.

Nabopolassar's descendants ruled Babylonia until his grandson, Amel-Marduk, was deposed by the general and official Neriglissar in 560 BC. Neriglissar was powerful and influential prior to becoming king, but was not related to the dynasty by blood, instead likely being of Aramean origin, probably of the Puqudu clan. He was not completely unconnected to the Chaldean dynasty, however, having secured his claim to the throne through marriage to one of Nebuchadnezzar II's daughters, possibly Kaššaya. Neriglissar was succeeded by his son, Labashi-Marduk, who was deposed shortly thereafter. Why Labashi-Marduk was deposed is not known, but it is possible that he was the son of Neriglissar and a wife other than Nebuchadnezzar II's daughter, and thus completely unconnected to the Chaldean dynasty.

The leader of the coup to depose Labashi-Marduk was likely the courtier Belshazzar, who in Labashi-Marduk's place proclaimed Nabonidus, Belshazzar's father, as king. The sources suggest that while he was part of the conspiracy, Nabonidus had not intended, nor expected, to become king himself and he was hesitant to accept the nomination. Nabonidus's rise to the throne put Belshazzar first in the line of succession (it would not have been suitable for him to have become king himself while his father was still alive) and also made him one of the wealthiest men in Babylonia as he inherited Labashi-Marduk's family's estates. It is probable that Nabonidus, like Neriglissar, was also married to a daughter of Nebuchadnezzar II and that this was the method in which he had secured a claim to the throne. This would also explain later traditions that Belshazzar was a descendant of Nebuchadnezzar II. Nabonidus appears to have been a devotee of the god Sîn, though the extent to which he might have attempted to elevate Sîn over Babylon's national deity Marduk is disputed. Subsequent Babylonians appear to have remembered Nabonidus as unorthodox and misguided, though not insane or necessarily a bad ruler. Belshazzar never became king and Babylon ultimately fell under Nabonidus's leadership, as Cyrus the Great of the Achaemenid Empire invaded Babylonia in 539 BC and put an end to the Neo-Babylonian Empire. The fates of Nabonidus and Belshazzar are not known. Nabonidus may have been allowed to live and retire but it is typically assumed that Belshazzar was killed.

== Family tree of the Chaldean dynasty ==
Broadly follows Wiseman (1983). The reconstruction of Nabopolassar's ancestry follows Jursa (2007), Neriglissar's ancestry follows Wiseman (1991) and the children of Nebuchadnezzar II follow Beaulieu (1998) and Wiseman (1983). It is not clear whether Labashi-Marduk and Gigitum were Neriglissar's children by Kashshaya, or by another wife unrelated to the ruling dynasty. It is also not certain that Nabonidus actually married one of Nebuchadnezzar's daughters, which puts some uncertainty on the assumption that Belshazzar and his siblings were descendants of Nebuchadnezzar. The birth order of any of the children, besides Nebuchadnezzar being Nabopolassar's oldest son and Nabu-shum-lishir being Nabopolassar's second son, is uncertain.

Blood relatives of Nabopolassar
Matrilineal descent – veracity of Chaldean dynasty descent not universally accepted by historians

Nabonassar
Puqudu clan (Arameans) | Nebuchadnezzar ('Kudurru') | Nabû-ušabši | Bēl-uballiṭ
Nabû-epir-la'a | Median dynasty | Nabopolassar r. 626 – 605 BC | Nabû-šumu-ukīn
Bel-šum-iškun | Amytis | Nebuchadnezzar II r. 605 – 562 BC | Nabû-šum-līšir | Nabû-zer-ušabši | Adad-gûppîʾ | Nabû-balātsu-iqbi
Neriglissar r. 560 – 556 BC | Kaššaya | Innin-etirat | Ba'u-asitu | Marduk-nadin-ahi | Eanna-šarra-uṣur | Amel-Marduk r. 562 – 560 BC | Marduk-šum-uṣur | Marduk-nadin-šumi | Mušezib-Marduk | A daughter (?) (Nitocris?) | Nabonidus r. 556 – 539 BC
Labaši-Marduk r. 556 BC | Gigitum | Nabû-šuma-ukin | Indû | Belshazzar | Ennigaldi-Nanna | Ina-Esagila-remat | Akkabuʾunma | Others (Note: The two later Babylonian rebels Nebuchadnezzar III and Nebuchadnezzar IV both claimed to be sons of Nabonidus, but this was not true for either rebel. Nebuchadnezzar III was actually the son of a man called Mukīn-zēri and Nebuchadnezzar IV was of Urartian (Armenian) origin. Regardless of the illegitimacy of these rebels, it is known that Nabonidus had great-grandchildren, though their names and precise lineages are not known. Records at Sippar may indicate the existence of at least one more daughter of Nabonidus, though her name is not known.)
Descendants (?) (Note: Nabû-šuma-ukin was the son of a man named Širikti-Marduk and belonged to the prominent Arkâ-ilī-damqā family in Borsippa, serving as the high priest of that city's main temple, the Ezida. His family's presence in Babylonia is recorded since the reign of the 8th-century BC king Nabu-shuma-ishkun. The Arkâ-ilī-damqā family is last attested in Borsippa and Babylon in the reign of Darius the Great (r. 522–486 BC).) | Descendants (?) (Note: Later Jewish tradition ascribes Belshazzar a daughter called Vashti, who in the Book of Esther is described as the first wife of the king Ahasuerus. Her existence is not historically verified.) | Descendants

== Notes ==
— Royal house — Chaldean dynasty Founding year: 626 BC
| Preceded by Sargonid dynasty | Ruling House of Babylonia; 626–539 BC | Succeeded by Achaemenid dynasty (Achaemenid Empire) |
