= Labashi-Marduk =

King of Babylon

- King of Babylon; King of Sumer and Akkad

King of the Neo-Babylonian Empire
- Reign: April – May/June 556 BC
- Predecessor: Neriglissar
- Successor: Nabonidus
- Died: May/June 556 BC; Babylon?
- Akkadian: Lâbâši-Marduk; Lā-bâš-Marduk
- House: Puqudu
- Dynasty: Chaldean dynasty (matrilineal) (?)
- Father: Neriglissar
- Mother: Kashshaya (?)

Labashi-Marduk (Neo-Babylonian Akkadian: 𒆷𒁀𒅆𒀭𒀫𒌓, romanized: Lâbâši-Marduk or Lā-bâš-Marduk, meaning "O Marduk, may I not come to shame") was the fifth and penultimate king of the Neo-Babylonian Empire, ruling in 556 BC. He was the son and successor of Neriglissar. Though classical authors such as Berossus wrote that Labashi-Marduk was just a child when he became king, Babylonian documents indicate that he had been in charge of his own affairs before his rise to the throne, suggesting he was an adult, though possibly still relatively young.

Labashi-Marduk's reign was very short, lasting only one to three months, with the last evidence of Neriglissar's life dating in April 556 BC and documents dated to Labashi-Marduk's successor, Nabonidus, appearing in May that same year and becoming widespread in Babylonia by the end of June. Nabonidus's son Belshazzar led a coup against the king, deposing and killing Labashi-Marduk and proclaiming Nabonidus as king. The reason for Labashi-Marduk's deposition is unknown, Berossus simply describes the justification as Labashi-Marduk having indulged in "evil ways". One possible explanation is that whereas Neriglissar derived his claim to the throne from having married a daughter of Nebuchadnezzar II, a previous king, Labashi-Marduk may have been wholly unconnected to the Babylonian ruling dynasty, as a result of being the son of another wife.

== Background ==
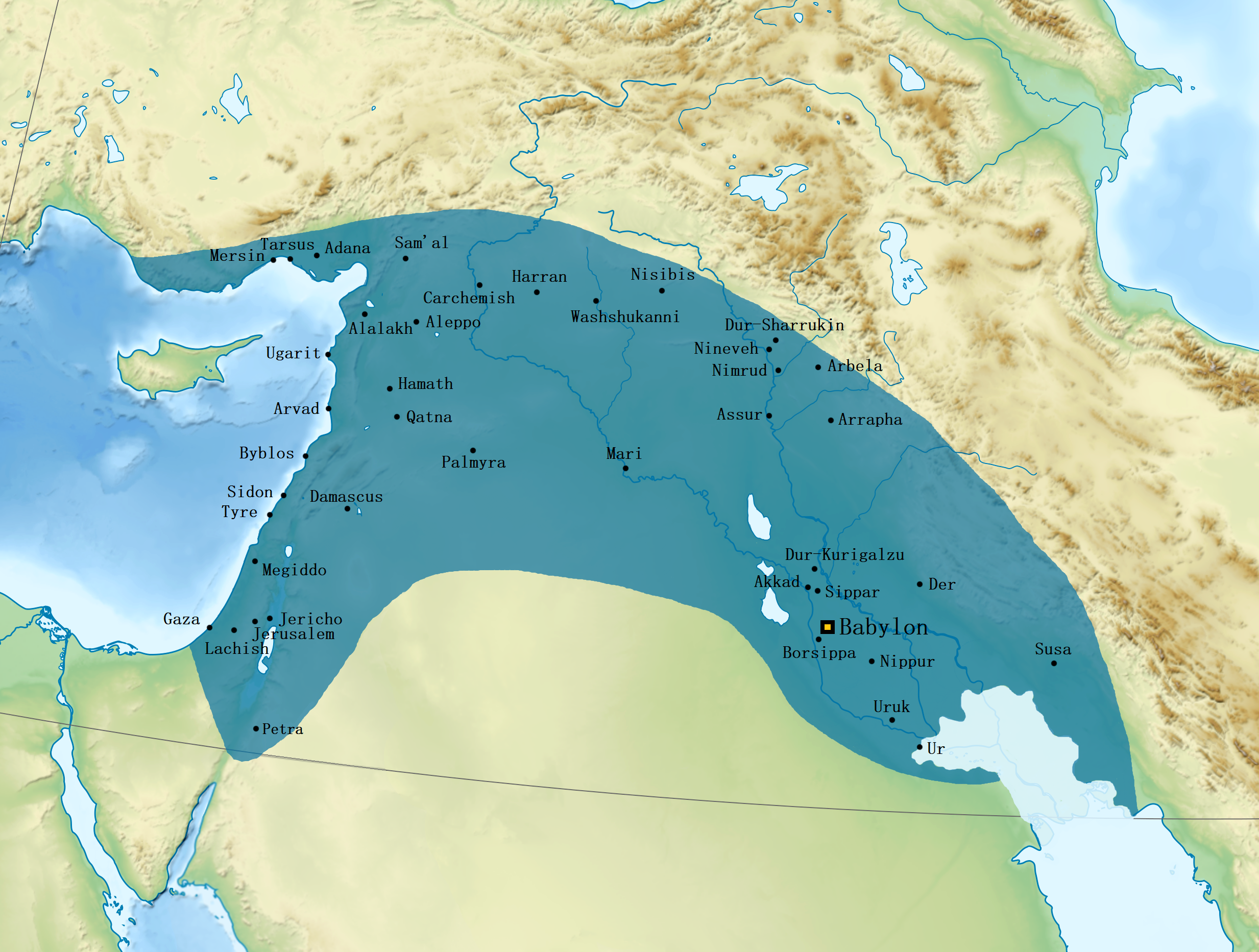
The Neo-Babylonian Empire under Nebuchadnezzar II

Labashi-Marduk was the son and heir of Neriglissar (r. 560–556 BC), the fourth king of the Neo-Babylonian Empire. Labashi-Marduk's mother was a daughter of Nebuchadnezzar II (r. 605–562 BC), the empire's second and most powerful king. Three daughters of Nebuchadnezzar are known; Kashshaya, Innin-etirat and Ba'u-asitu, but no cuneiform text explicitly mentions which daughter Neriglissar married. Historian David B. Weisberg proposed in 1974 that Neriglissar's wife was Kashshaya, since her name appears together with the name of Nebuchadnezzar and Neriglissar in economic documents. Though no concrete evidence exists, this identification has generally been accepted by subsequent historians, such as Donald Wiseman and Jona Lendering.

Neriglissar was the son of a man by the name Bel-shum-ishkun and might originally have been from the Aramean clan of the Puqudu, since Bel-shum-ishkun is recorded as originating in the Babylonian province of the same name. According to the later Hellenistic-era Babylonian writer and astronomer Berossus, Naboukhodonosoros (Nebuchadnezzar) died of sickness after a reign of 43 years and was succeeded by his son Euilmaradokhos (Amel-Marduk), who "ruled capriciously and had no regard for the laws". After a reign of two years, Neriglassaros (Neriglissar) plotted against Amel-Marduk and had him deposed and killed. If Berossus is to be believed, Neriglissar was the leader of this conspiracy. It is likely that the conflict between Amel-Marduk and Neriglissar was a case of inter-family discord rather than some other form of rivalry. Neriglissar's claim to the throne likely came through his marriage to Nebuchadnezzar's daughter, who might have been significantly older than either of Nebuchadnezzar's sons (as she is attested significantly earlier in her father's reign).

== Reign ==
Neriglissar probably died in April 556 BC. The last known documents dated to Neriglissar's reign are a contract from 12 April 556 BC at Babylon and a contract from 16 April that same year from the city of Uruk. The Uruk King List (IM 65066, also known as King List 5), a record of rulers of Babylon from Shamash-shum-ukin (r. 668–648 BC) to the Seleucid king Seleucus II Callinicus (r. 246–225 BC), accords Neriglissar a reign of three years and eight months, consistent with the possibility that Neriglissar died in April.

Labashi-Marduk thus became king of Babylon, but his reign proved to be brief. Because he reigned for such a short period of time, no inscriptions survive from his time as king. Berossus erroneously gives Labashi-Marduk's reign as nine months (though it is possible that this is a scribal error) and states that Labashi-Marduk's "evil ways" led to his friends plotting against him, eventually resulting in the child king being beaten to death. The plotters then agreed that Nabonnedos (Nabonidus), one of the plotters, should rule. The Uruk King List only gives Labashi-Marduk a reign of three months and contract tablets from Babylonia suggest that he might have ruled as briefly as just two months. It appears the transition in leadership was either a brief period of confusion after a discrete palace coup, or a brief civil war. Labashi-Marduk was still recognised as king at Uruk up until at least 19 June, and in the key city of Sippar until at least 20 June. The earliest known document dated to the reign of Nabonidus at Sippar is from 26 June. However, the earliest document dated to Nabonidus at the city of Nippur is from 25 May and the latest documents dated to Labashi-Marduk at Babylon itself are from 24 May. The earliest known tablet dated to Nabonidus at Babylon is from 14 July. This evidence can be reconciled by positing that Nabonidus may have been recognised in the Babylonian heartland, including Nippur and Babylon, already on 25 May, whereas some outlying cities continued to recognise Labashi-Marduk (even though he quite possibly was dead at the time on account of a possible palace coup) as king until June. By the end of June 556 BC, tablets dated to Nabonidus are known from across Babylonia.

Although Berossus refers to Labashi-Marduk as a child, it possible that he became king as an adult since commercial texts from two years earlier indicate that Labashi-Marduk was in charge of his own affairs at that time. Labashi-Marduk may still have been relatively young, however. One of the inscriptions of Nabonidus refers to Labashi-Marduk as "a young boy who had not yet learned proper behavior".

The reason for the coup against Labashi-Marduk is unknown. It is possible that despite Labashi-Marduk and his father being well-connected and wealthy, they were ultimately seen as commoners, lacking noble blood. Though his mother would have connected him to the royal dynasty as the grandson of Nebuchadnezzar, it is also possible that Labashi-Marduk was the son of Neriglissar and another of his wives. Thus, Labashi-Marduk's rise to the throne might have signified a true break in the dynasty of Nebuchadnezzar and might as such have aroused opposition from the Babylonian populace. After Labashi-Marduk's death, the considerable wealth and estates of Neriglissar's family were confiscated and eventually taken up by Belshazzar, the son of Nabonidus, who (as the main beneficiary) was likely the main orchestrator of the conspiracy against Labashi-Marduk.

Labashi-Marduk Clan of the Puqudu / Chaldean dynasty Died: 556 BC
Preceded by Neriglissar	King of Babylon; 556 BC	Succeeded by Nabonidus
