= Amytis of Media =

Nebuchadnezzar II's wife

Amytis
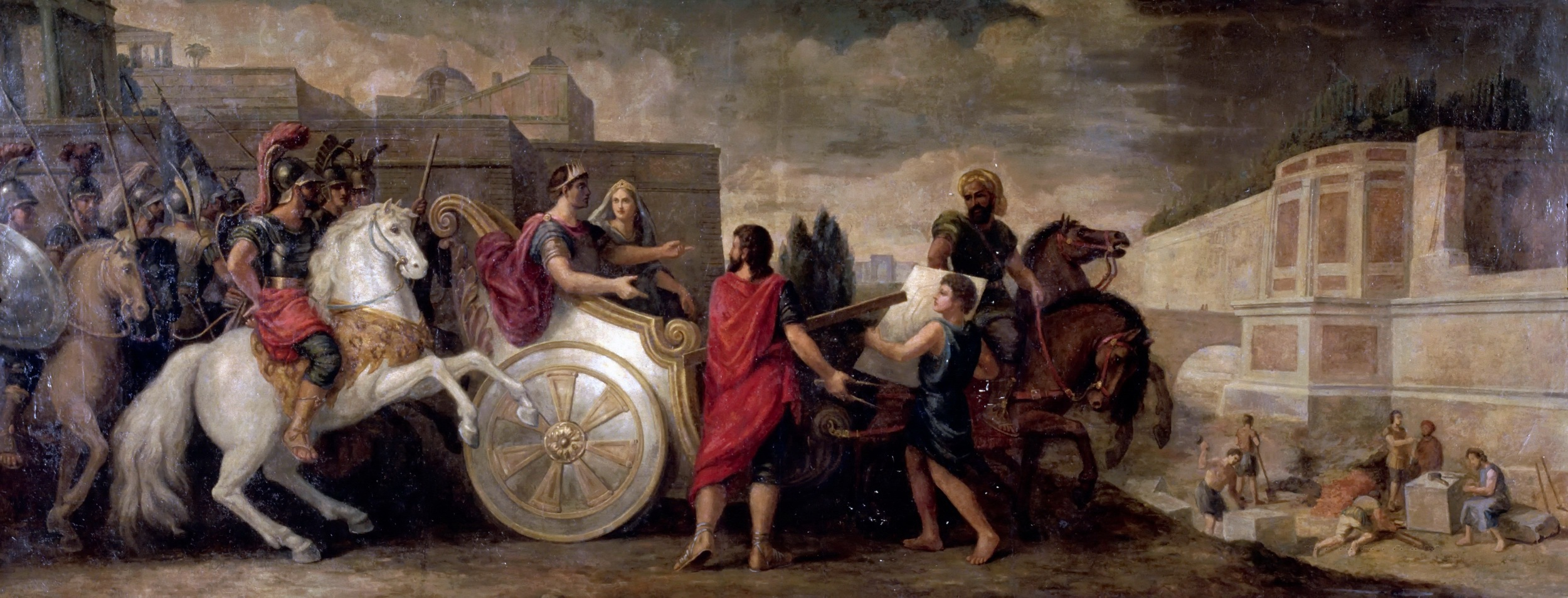
- Nebuchadnezzar and his wife watching the construction of the hanging gardens
- Born: Ecbatana
- Died: c. 565 BCE; Babylon
- Spouse: Nebuchadnezzar II (?)
- Issue: Kaššaya (?); Amel-Marduk (?); Nitocris (?)
- Median: *ᴴumati
- House: Median
- Father: Cyaxares

Amytis of Media (c. 630-565 BCE; Median: *ᴴumati; Ancient Greek: Ancient Greek: Αμυτις, romanized: Amutis; Latin: Amytis) was a queen of Babylon, wife of Nebuchadnezzar II and daughter of the Median king Cyaxares.

== Name ==
The female name Amytis is the Latinised form of the Greek name Amutis (Αμυτις), which perhaps may reflect (with vowel metathesis) an original Median name *ᴴumati, meaning "having good thought," and which is an equivalent of the Avestan term humaⁱti (𐬵𐬎𐬨𐬀𐬌𐬙𐬌) or humata (𐬵𐬎𐬨𐬀𐬙𐬀).

== Life ==
Amytis was the daughter of Cyaxares, and the sister of Astyages. Amytis had a niece, also named Amytis, from her brother Astyages.

Amytis married Nebuchadnezzar to formalize the alliance between the Babylonian and Median dynasties.

Tradition relates that Amytis's yearning for the forested mountains of Media led to the construction of the Hanging Gardens of Babylon, as Nebuchadnezzar attempted to please her by planting the trees and plants of her homeland. Historical evidence, however, does not lend support to this tradition.

== Bibliography ==
- Schmitt, R. (1989). "AMYTIS". Encyclopædia Iranica.
