= Neriglissar =

Babylonian king from 560 BC to 556 BC

- King of Babylon; King of Sumer and Akkad

King of the Neo-Babylonian Empire
- Reign: August 560 BC – April 556 BC
- Predecessor: Amel-Marduk
- Successor: Labashi-Marduk
- Died: April 556 BC; Babylon
- Spouse: Kashshaya (?)
- Issue: Labashi-Marduk; Gigitum
- Akkadian: Nergal-šar-uṣur; Nergal-šarra-uṣur
- House: Puqudu
- Dynasty: Chaldean dynasty (through marriage)
- Father: Bel-shum-ishkun

Neriglissar (Neo-Babylonian Akkadian: 𒀭𒌋𒄥𒈗𒋀, romanized: Nergal-šar-uṣur or Nergal-šarra-uṣur, meaning "Nergal, protect the king") was the fourth king of the Neo-Babylonian Empire, ruling from his usurpation of the throne in 560 BC to his death in 556 BC. Though unrelated to previous Babylonian kings, possibly being of Aramean ancestry, Neriglissar was a prominent official and general in the reign of Nebuchadnezzar II (r. 605–562 BC) and became even more influential through marrying one of Nebuchadnezzar's daughters, possibly Kashshaya.

Nebuchadnezzar was initially succeeded by his son, Amel-Marduk, but Amel-Marduk's reign only lasted for two years before Neriglissar usurped the Babylonian throne and put him to death. Through his marriage to Nebuchadnezzar's daughter, possibly significantly older than any of the old king's sons, Neriglissar might have represented a less legitimate but more wealthy and well-established faction of the royal family, even if he himself was not part of this family.

The most well documented event of Neriglissar's reign is his successful 557–556 BC campaign in Anatolia against Appuwashu, king of a small kingdom in Cilicia. Neriglissar successfully captured Appuwashu's capital, Ura, as well as another city, Kirshu, before conducting an amphibious attack against a nearby island and then laying waste to mountain passes on the western border to Lydia. Shortly after returning home to Babylonia victorious, Neriglissar died in April 556 BC. He was succeeded as king by his son, Labashi-Marduk, whose reign would only last for two or three months before being deposed and killed in favour of Nabonidus.

== Background ==
=== Reign of Nebuchadnezzar ===
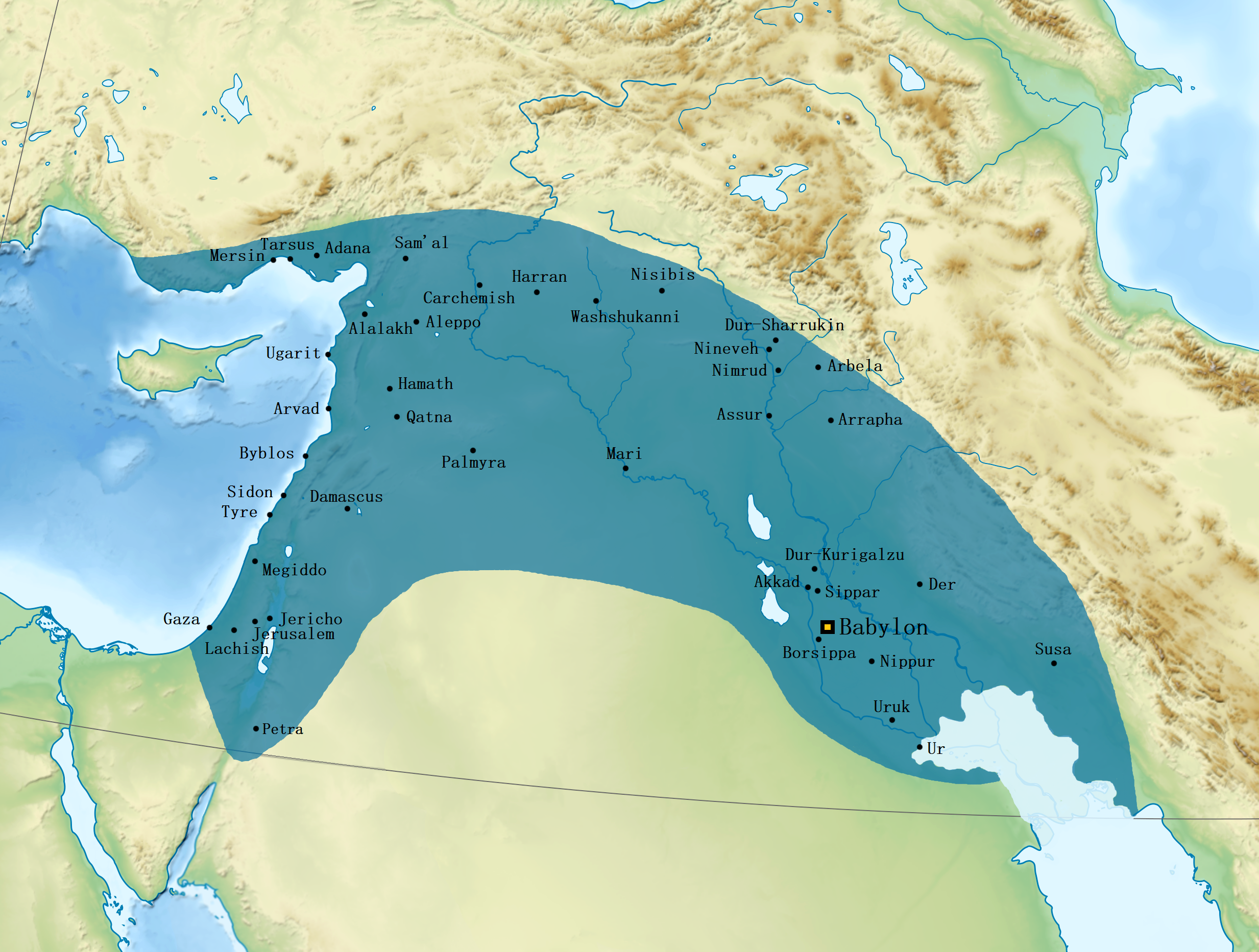
The Neo-Babylonian Empire under Nebuchadnezzar II

The Neo-Babylonian Empire reached the apex of its power during the reign of its second king, Nebuchadnezzar II (r. 605–562 BC). During his rule, the empire consolidated its territories and army and established its hegemony over territories that had once belonged to the Neo-Assyrian Empire, defeated and destroyed by Nebuchadnezzar's father Nabopolassar (r. 626–605 BC). Throughout his reign, Nebuchadnezzar spent much time and many resources on extensive building projects throughout Babylonia, mostly focusing on his capital, Babylon. As the royal treasury became more and more strained under the weight of the expenditures, local businessmen would come to grow wealthier and, as a consequence, more influential in political matters.

According to Neriglissar's own inscriptions, he was the son of a man by the name Bel-shum-ishkun (Bêl-šum-iškun). This is probably the same person as Bel-shum-ishkun, son of Nabu-epir-la'a (Nabû-ēpir-la'î), whose income is listed in a Babylonian economic document alongside the incomes of Nebuchadnezzar and one of the king's daughters, Kashshaya. Both Neriglissar and Bel-shum-ishkun are also listed in another royal document that records various officials of the empire, wherein Neriglissar is recorded as a Simmagir official and Bel-shum-ishkun is recorded as originating in the province Puqudu. Both Neriglissar and his father might have been from the Aramean clan of the Puqudu (same name as the province from which Bel-shum-ishkun originated).

Neriglissar was an active businessman and landowner during Nebuchadnezzar's reign. He is recorded as having purchased properties from a bankrupt man by the name Nabu-ahhe-iddina and from a wealthy banker by the name Iddina-Marduk, both in Sippar. In addition to Sippar, Neriglissar also owned estates in Uruk. Due to his presence at Sippar, and due to him being recorded as present at Opis in 565/564 BC, it is possible that Neriglissar was involved in the construction of Nebuchadnezzar's Median Wall, meant to protect Babylon from attacks from the north. In addition to being a wealthy landowner, Neriglissar was also one of Nebuchadnezzar's leading officials as a Simmagir. During Nebuchadnezzar's military campaigns, Neriglissar served as an officer of the rank rab māg. He might be identical to a "Nergalšareṣer" which the Bible describes as present at Nebuchadnezzar's siege of Jerusalem in 597 BC (Jeremiah 39:13).

=== Rise to the throne ===
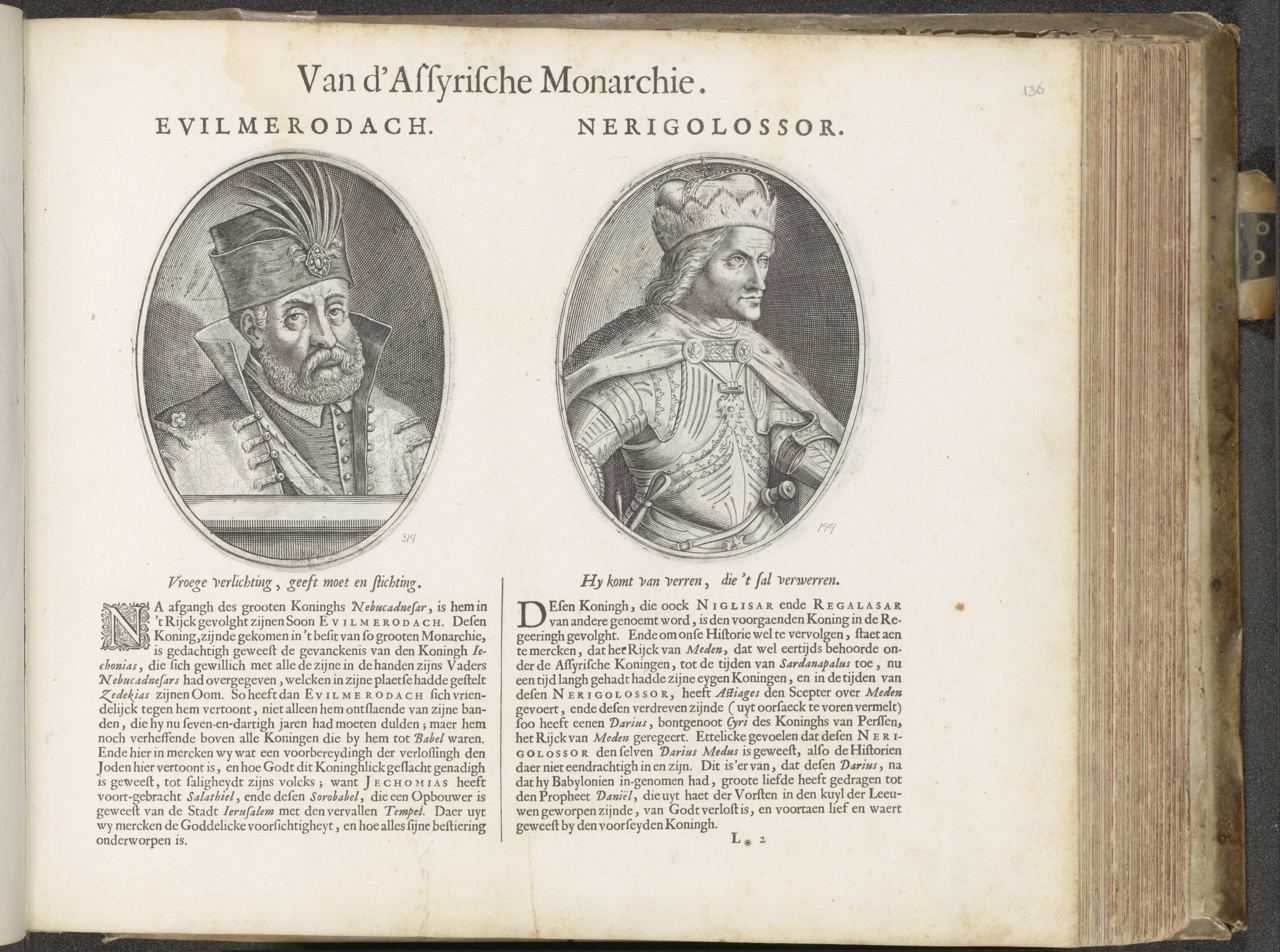
17th-century portraits of Neriglissar ('Nerigolossor') and his predecessor Amel-Marduk ('Evilmerodach')

Neriglissar's influence was further increased through his marriage to one of Nebuchadnezzar's daughters. Historian David B. Weisberg proposed in 1974 that the daughter in question was Kashshaya, since her name appears together with the name of Nebuchadnezzar, Neriglissar and Bel-shum-ishkun in economic documents. Although there is no concrete evidence that Kashshaya, instead of one of Nebuchadnezzar's other daughters, was the wife of Neriglissar, subsequent historians, such as Donald Wiseman and Jona Lendering, have accepted the assumption that Neriglissar married Kashshaya.

According to the later Hellenistic-era Babylonian writer and astronomer Berossus, Naboukhodonosoros (Nebuchadnezzar) died of sickness after a reign of 43 years and was succeeded by his son Euilmaradokhos (Amel-Marduk), who "ruled capriciously and had no regard for the laws". After ruling two years, Neriglassaros (Neriglissar) plotted against Amel-Marduk and had him deposed and killed. If Berossus is to be believed, Neriglissar was the leader of this conspiracy. It is likely that the conflict between Amel-Marduk and Neriglissar was a case of inter-family discord rather than some other form of rivalry.

Neriglissar's marriage to Kashshaya (or another of Nebuchadnezzar's daughters) is probably what made usurping the throne possible. A factor which might have significantly improved Neriglissar's chances of becoming king was the position of Kashshaya relative to Nebuchadnezzar's other children. Kashshaya might have been the oldest of all of Nebuchadnezzar's children as she is attested as being active significantly earlier in his reign (5th year) than most of his sons (most attested in Nebuchadnezzar's 39th–41st years). Although the sons only being referenced this late could also be coincidental or accidental, the significant gap in time could even be interpreted as an indication that the sons were the product of a second marriage. It is thus possible that the usurpation was the result of infighting between an older, wealthier and more influential branch of the royal family (represented by Nebuchadnezzar's daughters, Kashshaya in particular) and a less well established and younger, though more legitimate, branch (represented by Nebuchadnezzar's sons, such as Amel-Marduk). Kashshaya is, like Neriglissar, attested as a wealthy landowner in Uruk during her father's reign.

== Reign ==
=== Early activities ===
There are only a small number of cuneiform sources for the period between 594 BC and 557 BC, covering much of the later reign of Nebuchadnezzar as well as the reigns of Amel-Marduk, Neriglissar and Neriglissar's son and successor Labashi-Marduk. Historical reconstructions of this period as such generally follow secondary sources in Hebrew, Greek and Latin to determine what events transpired at the time, in addition to contract tablets from Babylonia. The last document dated to the reign of Amel-Marduk is a contract dated to 7 August 560 BC, written in Babylon. Four days later, documents instead dated to Neriglissar are known from both Babylon and Uruk. Judging by increased economic activity attributed to him in the capital, Neriglissar was at Babylon at the time of the usurpation.

After becoming king, Neriglissar increased his hold on the throne through marrying his daughter, Gigitum (Gigītu), to Nabu-shuma-ukin, the administrator of the Ezida temple in Borsippa and an influential religious leader. Not much is otherwise documented from Neriglissar's first two years as king. He is known to have continued construction and repair work on the Esagila, the main temple in Babylon, as well as repaired the royal palace and the eastern bank of the Euphrates river after its annual flooding.

=== Campaign in Anatolia ===
In Neriglissar's third year as king, 557 BC, he led a successful military campaign into Anatolia, an expedition chronicled in contemporary annals (chiefly the 'ABC 6' chronicle). The campaign was in response to rumours that Appuwashu (Appuašu), king of Piriddu or Pirindu, was planning a raid into Syria. To counter this raid, Neriglissar marched his army into Hume (eastern Cilicia, under Babylonian control ever since the fall of the Neo-Assyrian Empire). Although Appuwashu, who ruled a portion of territory west of Hume, had prepared ambushes and attacks to halt the Babylonian advance, he was defeated and pursued by Neriglissar for more than 25 kilometres (16 mi) of mountainous terrain along the Cilician coast until he reached his capital, Ura, which was taken and sacked by Neriglissar. Where Ura was located is unclear today, but it must have been somewhere in the vicinity of the modern city Silifke. After this victory, Neriglissar continued his campaign, marching another 65 kilometres to the north along the Göksu river to attack and destroy the city Kirshu (rebuilt centuries later as Claudiopolis).

After having taken Kirshu, Neriglissar undertook an amphibious attack against the island Pitusu, two miles off-shore, and then laid waste to the mountain passes that led to the settlement Sallune at the border of Lydia. Though Appuwashu escaped Neriglissar's onslaught, the campaign was successful in asserting Babylonian control of Piriddu and turned the small kingdom into a buffer state between the Babylonian, Lydian and Median empires.

The account of the campaign presented in the ABC 6 chronicle reads:

Appuašu, the king of Pirindu, mustered a large army and set out to plunder and sack Syria. Neriglissar mustered his army and marched to Hume to oppose him.
Before his arrival Appuašu placed the army and cavalry which he had organized in a mountain valley ambush. When Neriglissar reached them he inflicted a defeat upon them and conquered the large army. The army and numerous horses he captured. He pursued Appuašu or a distance of fifteen double-hours and marched through difficult mountains, where men must walk in single file, as far as Ura, the royal city.
He captured him, seized Ura, and sacked it. When he had marched for a distance of six double hours through rough mountains and difficult passes, from Ura to Kirši – his forefather's royal city – he captured Kirši, the mighty city, his royal metropolis. He burnt its wall, its palace, and its people.
Pitusu, a land in the midst of the ocean, and six thousand combat troops who were stationed in it he captured by means of boats. He destroyed their city and captured their people.
In that same year from the pass of Sallune to the border of Lydia he started fires. Appuašu fled, so he did not capture him.

In February 556 BC, Neriglissar turned home, a journey which probably would have taken him about fifty days. That his campaign had been conducted so far from Babylonia's core territory could mean that he was aided by the Median Empire, or that the campaign was partially intended to counteract the growing influence of the Medes in Anatolia.

=== Death and succession ===
Neriglissar did not rule for long. The last known documents dated to Neriglissar's reign are a contract from 12 April 556 BC at Babylon and a contract from 16 April that same year at Uruk. The Uruk King List (IM 65066, also known as King List 5), a record of rulers of Babylon from Shamash-shum-ukin (r. 668–648 BC) to the Seleucid king Seleucus II Callinicus (r. 246–225 BC), accords Neriglissar a reign of three years and eight months, consistent with the possibility that Neriglissar died in April.

Berossus writes that Neriglissar ruled four years before dying and being succeeded by his son Laborosoardokhos (Labashi-Marduk). Berossus erroneously gives Labashi-Marduk's reign as nine months (though it is possible that this is a scribal error) and states that Labashi-Marduk's "evil ways" led to his friends plotting against him, eventually resulting in the child king being beaten to death. The plotters then agreed that Nabonnedos (Nabonidus), one of the plotters, should rule. The Uruk King List only gives Labashi-Marduk a reign of three months and contract tablets from Babylonia suggest that he might have ruled as briefly as just two months. Although Berossus refers to Labashi-Marduk as a child, it possible that he became king as an adult since commercial texts from two years earlier indicate that Labashi-Marduk was in charge of his own affairs at that time.

Why Labashi-Marduk was deposed and killed in a coup (led by Nabonidus's son, Belshazzar) is unclear. It is possible that the reason was that although Labashi-Marduk and his father before him were well-connected and rich, they were ultimately seen as commoners, lacking noble blood. Additionally, it is possible that while Neriglissar was seen as legitimate due to his connection to Nebuchadnezzar through his wife, Labashi-Marduk might have been the son of another wife of Neriglissar and thus completely unconnected to the royal dynasty. Despite this, and despite his brief reign, Neriglissar was remembered favourably by later Babylonians. In his inscriptions, Nabonidus specifically mentions Nebuchadnezzar and Neriglissar as good kings with whom he had been associated.

== Titles ==
From one of his inscriptions commemorating his restoration of the Esagila at Babylon, Neriglissar's titles read as follows:

Neriglissar, king of Babylon, pious prince, the favorite of the god Marduk, the humble (and) submissive one who reveres the lord of lords, the wise (and) pious one, the one who constantly seeks out the shrines of the god Nabû — his lord — the ruler who provides, the one who brings large gifts to Esagil and Ezida, the one who copiously supplies offerings (and) ensures that their purification rites are carried out correctly, son of Bēl-šum-iškun, wise prince, the perfect warrior, the one who ensures the protection of Esagil and Babylon, the one who blocks the approach to the country like a strong wall, am I.

In another inscription, commemorating other building projects at Babylon, the titles used are the following:

Neriglissar, king of Babylon, the one who renovates Esagil and Ezida, the one who performs good deeds, about the exercise of whose everlasting kingship the great gods made a decision, whose fate the god Marduk — the foremost of the gods, the one who determines fates — determined to exercise authority over the lands, whose hands the god Nabû — the legitimate heir — let grasp a just scepter to perform the shepherdship over the black-headed (people), (Note: "Black-headed people" was a designation for the Sumerians, see Sumer.) to whom the god Erra — the majestic one of the gods — gave his weapon(s) to save the people (and) spare the land, son of Bēl-šum-iškun, king of Babylon, am I.

== Notes ==
Neriglissar Clan of the Puqudu / Chaldean dynasty Died: 556 BC
Preceded by Amel-Marduk	King of Babylon; 560–556 BC	Succeeded by Labashi-Marduk
