= Belshazzar =

- Crown prince of Babylon
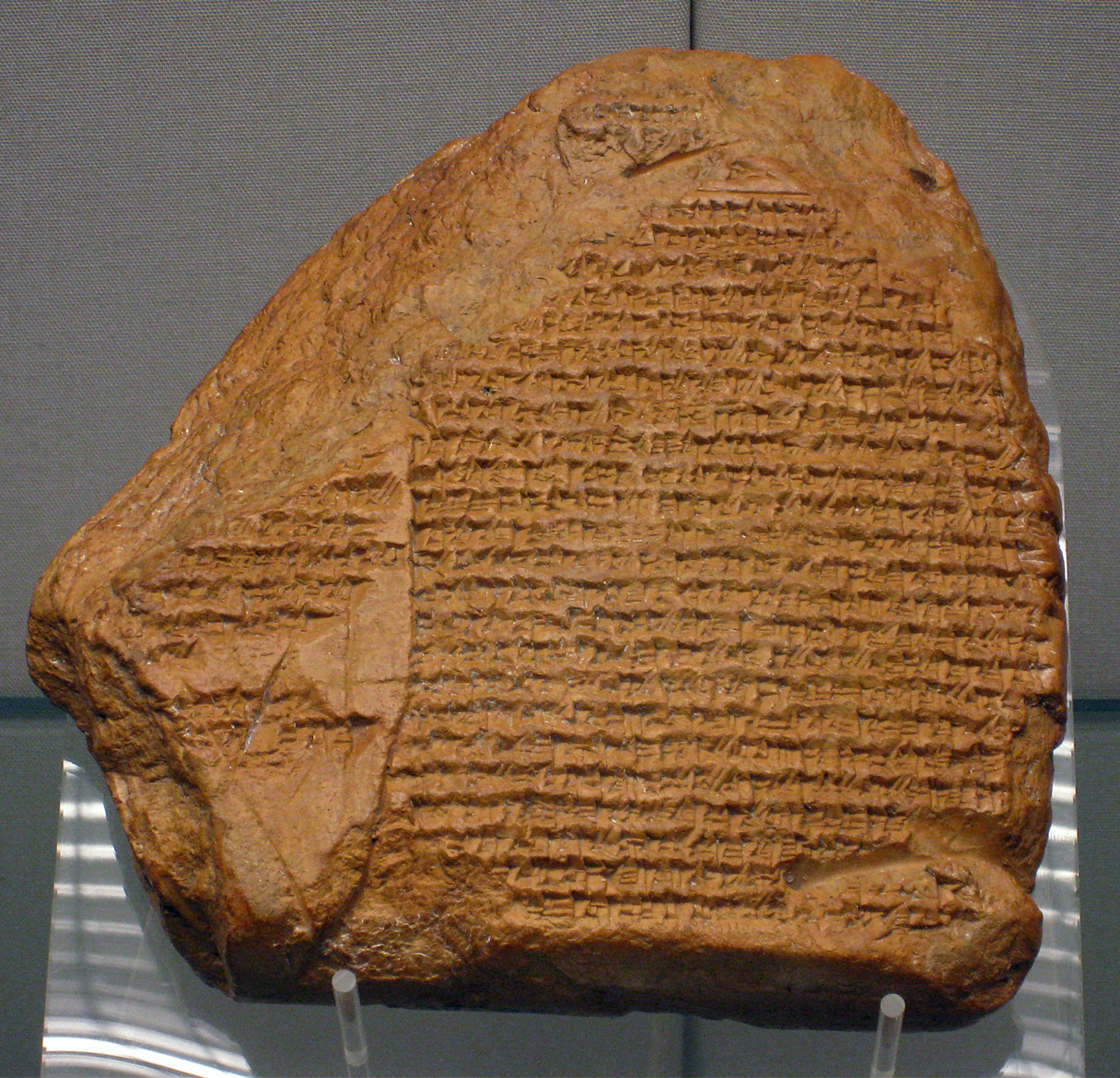
- The Nabonidus Chronicle, an ancient Babylonian text which chronicles the reign of Belshazzar's father and also documents the period during which Belshazzar was regent in Babylon
- Died: 12 October 539 BC (?); Babylon (?)
- Akkadian: Bēl-šar-uṣur
- Dynasty: Chaldean dynasty (matrilineal) (?)
- Father: Nabonidus
- Mother: Nitocris (?) (A daughter of Nebuchadnezzar II) (?)

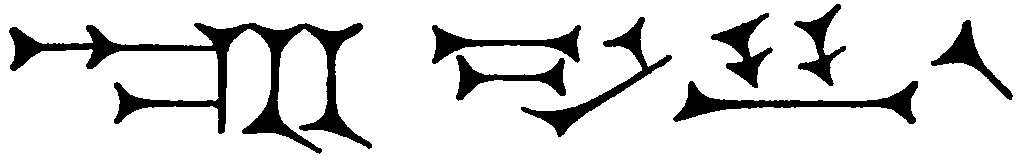
Belshazzar (Babylonian cuneiform: Bēl-šar-uṣur, meaning "Bel, protect the king"; Hebrew: בֵּלְשַׁאצַּר Bēlšaʾṣṣar) was the son and crown prince of Nabonidus (r. 556 – 539 BC), the last king of the Neo-Babylonian Empire. Through his mother, he might have been a grandson of Nebuchadnezzar II (r. 605 – 562 BC), though this is not certain and the claims to kinship with Nebuchadnezzar may have originated from royal propaganda.

Belshazzar played a pivotal role in the coup d'état that overthrew the king Labashi-Marduk (r. 556 BC– ) and brought Nabonidus to power in 556 BC. Since Belshazzar was the main beneficiary of the coup, through confiscating and inheriting Labashi-Marduk's estates and wealth, it is likely that he was the chief orchestrator. Through proclaiming his father as the new king, Belshazzar also made himself the first-in-line to the throne. As Nabonidus was relatively old at the time, Belshazzar could expect to become king within a few years.

Nabonidus was absent from Babylon from 553 BC to 543 or 542 BC, in self-imposed "exile" at Tayma in Arabia, for unknown reasons. For the duration of the decade-long absence of his father, Belshazzar served as regent in Babylon. Belshazzar was entrusted with many typically royal prerogatives, such as granting privileges, commanding portions of the army, and receiving offerings and oaths, though he continued to be styled as the crown prince (mār šarri, literally meaning "son of the king"), never assuming the title of king (šarru). Belshazzar also lacked many of the prerogatives of kingship, most importantly he was not allowed to preside over and officiate the Babylonian New Year's festival, which was the exclusive right of the king himself. Belshazzar's fate is not known, but is often assumed that he was killed during Cyrus the Great's Persian invasion of Babylonia in 539 BC, presumably at the fall of the capital Babylon on 12 October 539 BC.

Belshazzar appears as a central character in the story of Belshazzar's feast in the Biblical Book of Daniel, recognized by scholars as a work of historical fiction, written about four centuries after Belshazzar's lifetime. Daniel's Belshazzar is portrayed as arrogant but not necessarily malevolent (he, for instance, rewards Daniel for his interpretation of "the writing on the wall"), but in later Jewish tradition Belshazzar was presented as a tyrant who oppresses the Jewish people.

== Biography ==
=== Background ===
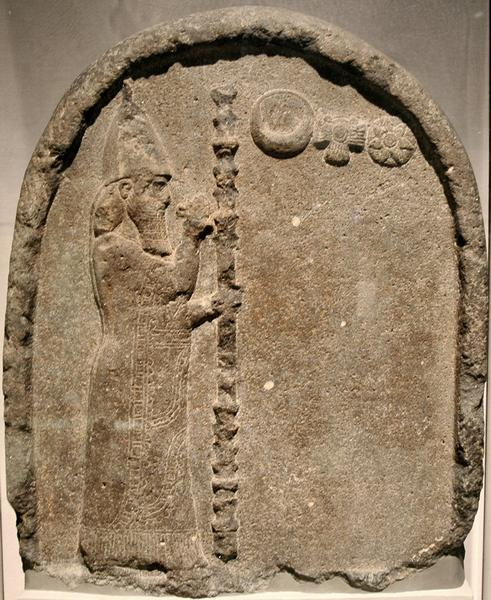
Stele depicting Nabonidus, Belshazzar's father

Belshazzar was the son of Nabonidus, an elderly courtier who would rise to become the last king of the Neo-Babylonian Empire. There are various theories concerning Nabonidus's origins, and in turn what claim he had to the throne, since it is not made clear in any contemporary sources. It is possible that Nabonidus was married to one of Nebuchadnezzar II's daughters. Not only would such a connection explain Nabonidus's rise to the throne (due to his being a member of the royal family), but it would also explain later historical traditions in which Belshazzar is described as Nebuchadnezzar's descendant. In the Book of Daniel in the Hebrew Bible, Belshazzar is referred to as Nebuchadnezzar's (grand)son. It is alternatively possible that later traditions of Belshazzar being a descendant of Nebuchadnezzar are derived from royal propaganda, and that there was no connection to the previous ruling Chaldean dynasty.

The ancient Greek historian Herodotus names the "last great queen" of the Babylonian Empire as Nitocris, though that name (nor any other name) is not attested in contemporary Babylonian sources. Herodotus's description of Nitocris contains a wealth of legendary material that makes it difficult to determine whether he uses the name to refer to Nabonidus's wife or mother, but William H. Shea proposed in 1982 that Nitocris may tentatively be identified as the name of Nabonidus's wife and Belshazzar's mother.

The most important sources for the time of Belshazzar are the Nabonidus Chronicle, the Cyrus Cylinder, and the Verse Account of Nabonidus—which, despite its name, was commissioned by the Persian conqueror Cyrus the Great. As all of these ancient Babylonian documents were written after Babylon was conquered by the Achaemenid Empire, they are biased in favor of Cyrus, and against Nabonidus and Belshazzar.

=== Conspiracy and accession of Nabonidus ===
Belshazzar's father was proclaimed as king in May 556 BC, and by the end of June, tablets recognising Nabonidus are known from across Babylonia. Belshazzar's father came to the throne as a result of a conspiracy that saw the deposition and murder of the previous king, Labashi-Marduk. The sources suggest that while he was part of the conspiracy, Nabonidus had not intended, nor expected, to become king himself and he was hesitant to accept the nomination. After the accession of his father, Belshazzar emerges in the sources as a prominent businessman and the head of a wealthy household, a role that was typically not picked up by members of the royal family in the Neo-Babylonian period. The only other similar case is Neriglissar, though Neriglissar lacked royal blood and had not been the intended successor to the throne, and abandoned his estates upon becoming king, seemingly entrusting them to Labashi-Marduk, his crown prince, and a figure of unclear connections called Nabu-sabit-qate. Whereas Neriglissar's career as a businessman prior to becoming king can be followed through a trail of surviving business documents, Belshazzar appears to have become a prominent member of the Babylonian oligarchy overnight (Belshazzar, in contrast to his co-conspirators was notably not a member of the old Babylonian aristocracy), not being mentioned in any business documents or private transactions prior to Nabonidus becoming king.

By examining surviving documents from Belshazzar's time as crown prince, it appears that the estates of Neriglissar's family were confiscated after Labashi-Marduk's death and that they were claimed and taken over by Belshazzar. This is supported by documents describing business transactions of Belshazzar mentioning the same locations, and even the same household and servants, as similar earlier documents of Neriglissar. Since there is little change in the prominent members of Neriglissar's and Labashi-Marduk's former household under Belshazzar, it is probable that Belshazzar becoming the master of the household was met with relatively little opposition. Through the deposition of Labashi-Marduk, Belshazzar had positioned himself to become the heir of one of Babylonia's wealthiest families. Belshazzar is recorded as owning lands throughout Babylonia, for instance owning an agricultural settlement near Uruk.

As he was clearly the main beneficiary of the coup, Belshazzar was likely the chief orchestrator of the conspiracy ended in the deposition and death of Labashi-Marduk. Because he could hardly proclaim himself as king while his father was still alive, Belshazzar proclaimed Nabonidus as king. As Nabonidus was relatively old at the time, his reign could be expected to be brief and transitional, meaning that Belshazzar could expect to inherit the throne within a few years.

=== Regent in Babylon ===
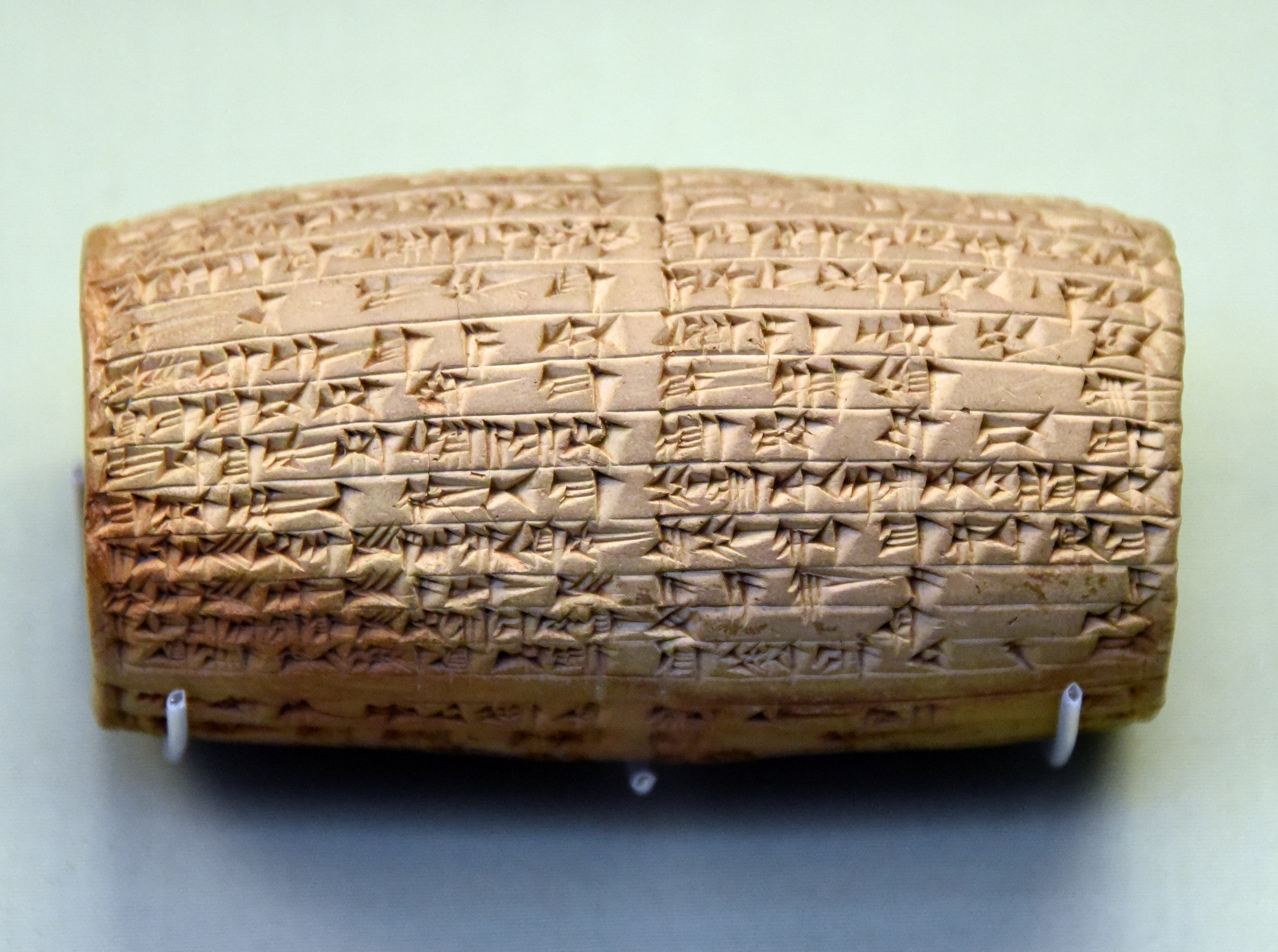
This clay cylinder records the restoration of Sin's ziggurat at Ur by Nabonidus, and also asks him to protect Nabonidus and his son, Belshazzar. From Ur, Iraq

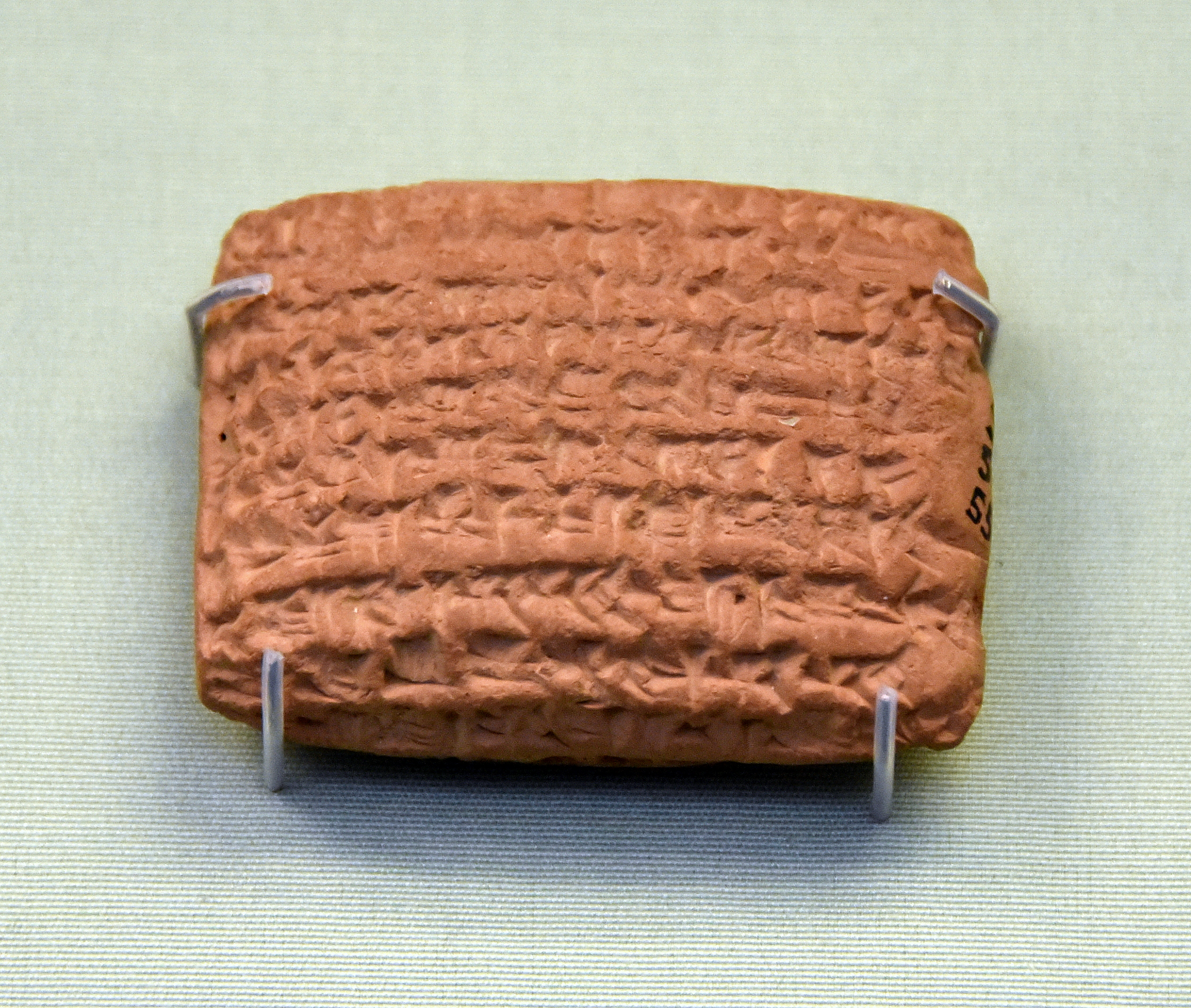
This administrative document is dated to the "24th day of Kislimu in the 11th year of Nabonidus, king of Babylon". It mentions a slave of Bel-sharra-usur (Belshazzar), son of the king. Although Belshazzar is acting as a regent, the formal date shows that Nabonidus is still the reigning king. From Borsippa, Iraq

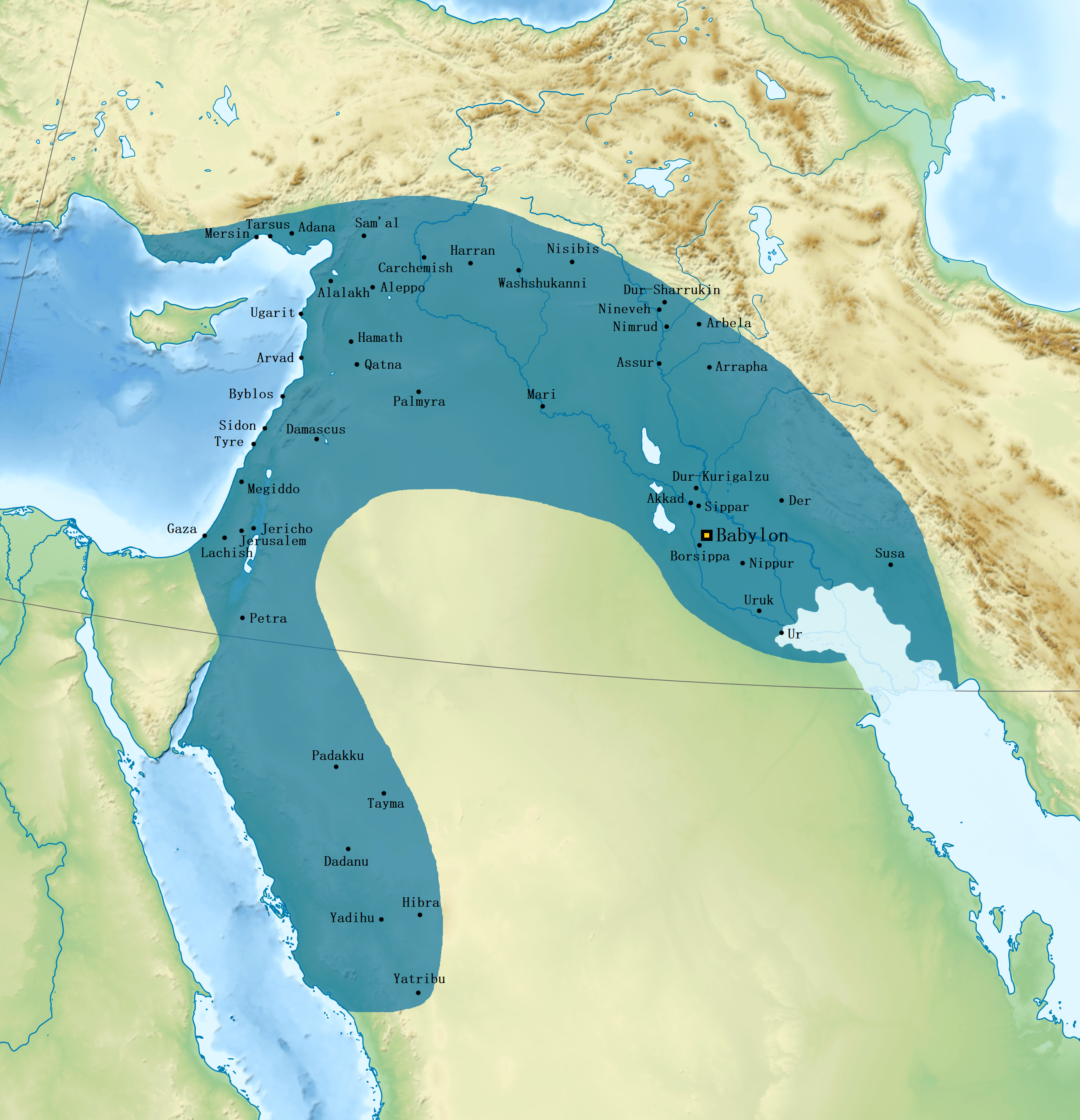
Map of the Neo-Babylonian Empire under Nabonidus

Nabonidus left Babylon in May 553 BC to campaign in the west. He eventually led his forces into Arabia conquering several cities, including the city of Tayma. Nabonidus made Tayma his provisional seat and he would stay there for about a decade, not returning to Babylon until September or October of 543 or 542 BC. October 543 BC is the return date most supported by surviving Babylonian documentation. The purpose for this prolonged stay, effectively self-exile, in Tayma is unclear and debated. During Nabonidus's absence, Belshazzar was put in charge of the administration in Babylonia. Though this period has often been dubbed a "co-regency", Belshazzar never assumed an official title. The Verse Account of Nabonidus, a biased document probably written after Nabonidus was deposed by Cyrus the Great, states that Nabonidus entrusted Belshazzar with the kingship, but there are no records of Belshazzar assuming the royal title. Though it is clear that Belshazzar during his father's absence assumed many responsibilities typically only held by the king, several prerogatives were also kept solely by Nabonidus. These include:

- Belshazzar never assumed, and was not allowed to use, the title of king (šarru), which was reserved for Nabonidus. Throughout the period of his father's absence, even though he was the effective ruler of Babylonia, contemporary documents continue to refer to Belshazzar as the crown prince (mār šarri, literally meaning "son of the king"). The only sources that refer to Belshazzar as king, rather than crown prince, are later Greek and Jewish sources that do so erroneously. Though he is never identified as king, several contemporary Babylonian documents refer to both Nabonidus and Belshazzar as "my lord", a designation usually reserved for the king alone.
- Belshazzar was not allowed to date documents after his own "regnal years". No documents are dated to the "reign of Belshazzar", and no documents mention both Belshazzar and Nabonidus as if there was a formal co-regency. Instead, documents from the period in which Belshazzar was regent continued to be dated after the years of Nabonidus's reign.
- Belshazzar was not allowed to officiate and oversee the Babylonian New Year's festival, which was the duty of the king. The festival was not celebrated throughout Nabonidus's absence, as Belshazzar was not allowed to take up the king's role in the ceremonies, and only resumed after Nabonidus returned to Babylon.
- Belshazzar is not mentioned in building inscriptions, which usually mention the king responsible. Even during the period of Nabonidus's absence, he is mentioned in building inscriptions in Babylonia as a builder and excavator as if he was actively ruling at the time, with no known references to Belshazzar. In some cases, such as a ritual performed at the temple of Bunene in Sippar, inscriptions attribute it to Nabonidus while surviving letters prove that Belshazzar was responsible.

Though Belshazzar's authority was thus limited, he also was allowed, and assumed, certain royal responsibilities. These include:

- Contemporary documents record rēḫātu (literally "remains", leftovers from food offerings presented to statues of deities) being sent to both Belshazzar and Nabonidus during the regency. Otherwise, rēḫātu is only recorded as having been sent to kings, receiving the remainders of cultic food having been an exclusive right of kings.
- In Babylonia, temples usually carried out offerings to the king, such as sacrificing a specified number of sheep. Prior to and after Belshazzar's regency, surviving texts only contain references to offerings to the king (i.e. Nabonidus), but during the period of the regency there are references to both "offerings to the king" and "offerings to the son of the king".
- In the Neo-Babylonian Empire, oaths were typically sworn by the king, and several gods, by individuals who were going to conduct various services. Though oaths for most of the regency only refer to Nabonidus, some oaths from late in the regency were sworn by "the majesty of Nabonidus, king of Babylon, and Belshazzar, his son", or even by "the majesty of Nabonidus and Belshazzar". As this phenomenon only began late in the regency period, it is not clear whether this was a prerogative that had been granted to Belshazzar, or if he inserted his name into oaths in violation of an agreement with his father.
- There may have been a division of the Babylonian army. The Verse Account of Nabonidus states that Nabonidus campaigned in Arabia with the "army of Akkad" (possibly referring to troops of Babylonian origin) whereas Belshazzar was entrusted at home with the "army of all the lands" (possibly referring to troops of foreign origin). Babylonian chronicles refer to the crown prince being stationed at home in Babylonia with "his army".
- Belshazzar could grant royal privileges identical to those granted by kings. One preserved document, which regards the granting of the privilege to cultivate a tract of land belonging to the Eanna temple in Uruk, is virtually identical to similar privileges issued by Nabonidus, though it is specified to have been issued by Belshazzar. As he could lease out temple land, this suggests that Belshazzar, in administrative matters, could act with full royal power. He was clearly the highest legal authority in Babylonia during Nabonidus's absence. Still, orders by Nabonidus superseded orders by Belshazzar. In one case, sacred garments that Belshazzar ordered to be granted to a temple in Uruk were held back because Nabonidus had given a contrary order before departing for Tayma. Nabonidus also sometimes sent orders to Belshazzar, which Belshazzar was forced to respect and implement.

The events that transpired in Babylonia during Belshazzar's regency are not well known, owing to a lack of surviving sources. It is clear that the New Year's festival was not celebrated, and that there was concern regarding the rising power of the Achaemenid Empire under Cyrus the Great. The Babylonian chronicles describe the actions and conquests of Cyrus in detail throughout Belshazzar's regency. As Nabonidus's stay in Tayma continued, Belshazzar became acutely aware of the threat presented by the Achaemenids, as he is recorded as having expended resources at projects in Sippar and nearby defenses. In 546 BC, Cyrus the Great crossed the Tigris to invade Lydia, ostensibly a Babylonian ally, and though Belshazzar took up a defensive position with his army, perhaps expecting a sudden Persian attack against Babylonia itself, no aid was sent to the Lydians, who were swiftly conquered by Cyrus. It is possible that Belshazzar had campaigned against the Persians on Lydia's behalf a year prior, in 547 BC. The fall of Lydia in 546 BC meant that the Neo-Babylonian Empire was now effectively encircled by a stronger kingdom which had nearly unlimited resources at its disposal. It seems likely that skirmishes along the border were frequent from then until Babylon's fall.

It is possible that a noteworthy return to orthodox Babylonian religion, following early attempts by Nabonidus to exalt the moon god Sîn over the traditional Babylonian supreme deity Marduk, can be attributed to Belshazzar. It may even have been Belshazzar who convinced his father to stay away from Babylonia in the first place, fearing a confrontation with the Babylonian oligarchy and clergy over his father's religious beliefs. It is probable that Nabonidus, a reformer, and Belshazzar, apparently more religiously conservative, did not see eye to eye in religious matters. Belshazzar appears to have worked to restore Marduk's status in his father's absence. Upon Nabonidus's return to Babylon, Belshazzar was demoted from his administrative responsibilities and officials he had appointed were dismissed. Nabonidus also had certain inscriptions made during the period of the regency edited to add prayers urging Belshazzar and the people of Babylonia to accept and receive Sîn's blessing.

=== Fate ===
Regardless of any potential animosity between Nabonidus and Belshazzar, Belshazzar retained the status of crown prince and intended successor, as a handful of documents still reference the "son of the king". Otherwise his status and position after Nabonidus's return is never made clear. The sources also do not make Belshazzar's location clear, but it appears that he was stationed some distance away from Babylon, but that he also was no longer in Sippar, where he had stationed himself in 546 BC out of fear of Cyrus. One possibility, suggested by Paul-Alain Beaulieu, is that Belshazzar was put in charge of Babylonia's defense and was moving with the army along the northern and eastern border.

Belshazzar partook in Babylon's defense against the invasion by Cyrus the Great in 539 BC. After a decisive victory at the battle of Opis, the Persian army, on 12 October, led by Ugbaru, entered Babylon without a fight. The last tablet dated to Nabonidus's reign is from Uruk and is dated to 13 October, which is considered the end date of his reign. Nabonidus was captured and possibly exiled to Carmania. Belshazzar's fate is not known, since none of the sources record it. It is often assumed that Belshazzar was killed by the Persians at Babylon when the city fell, on 12 October. He may have alternatively been killed already at the battle of Opis, captured and executed, or exiled together with his father.

== Legacy ==
=== Portrayal in the Book of Daniel ===
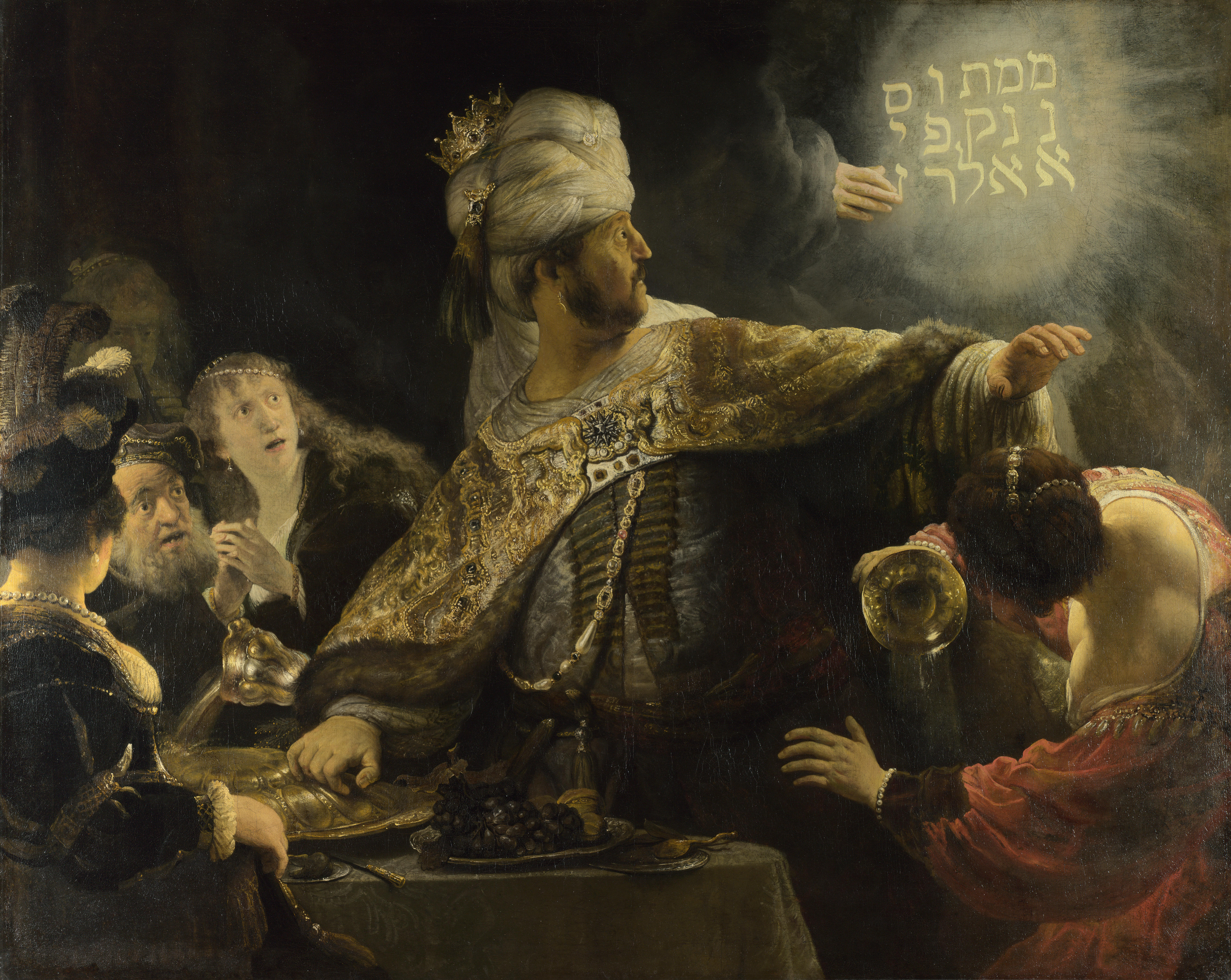
Belshazzar's Feast, (Rembrandt, c. 1635–1638)

In the Book of Daniel, Belshazzar (Hebrew: בֵּלְשַׁאצַּר, Bēlšaʾṣṣar) plays a significant role in the tale of Belshazzar's feast, a variation on the story of Nebuchadnezzar's madness showing what happens when a king does not repent. During a feast, Babylonians eat and drink from the holy vessels of Yahweh's temple, and "king" Belshazzar sees a hand writing the words mene, mene, tekel, upharsin on a wall. Daniel interprets the writing as a judgment from Yahweh, the god of Israel, foretelling the fall of Babylon. Daniel tells Belshazzar that because he has not given honor to God, his kingdom will be given to the Medes and Persians. Belshazzar is killed that night, and Darius the Mede takes the kingdom.

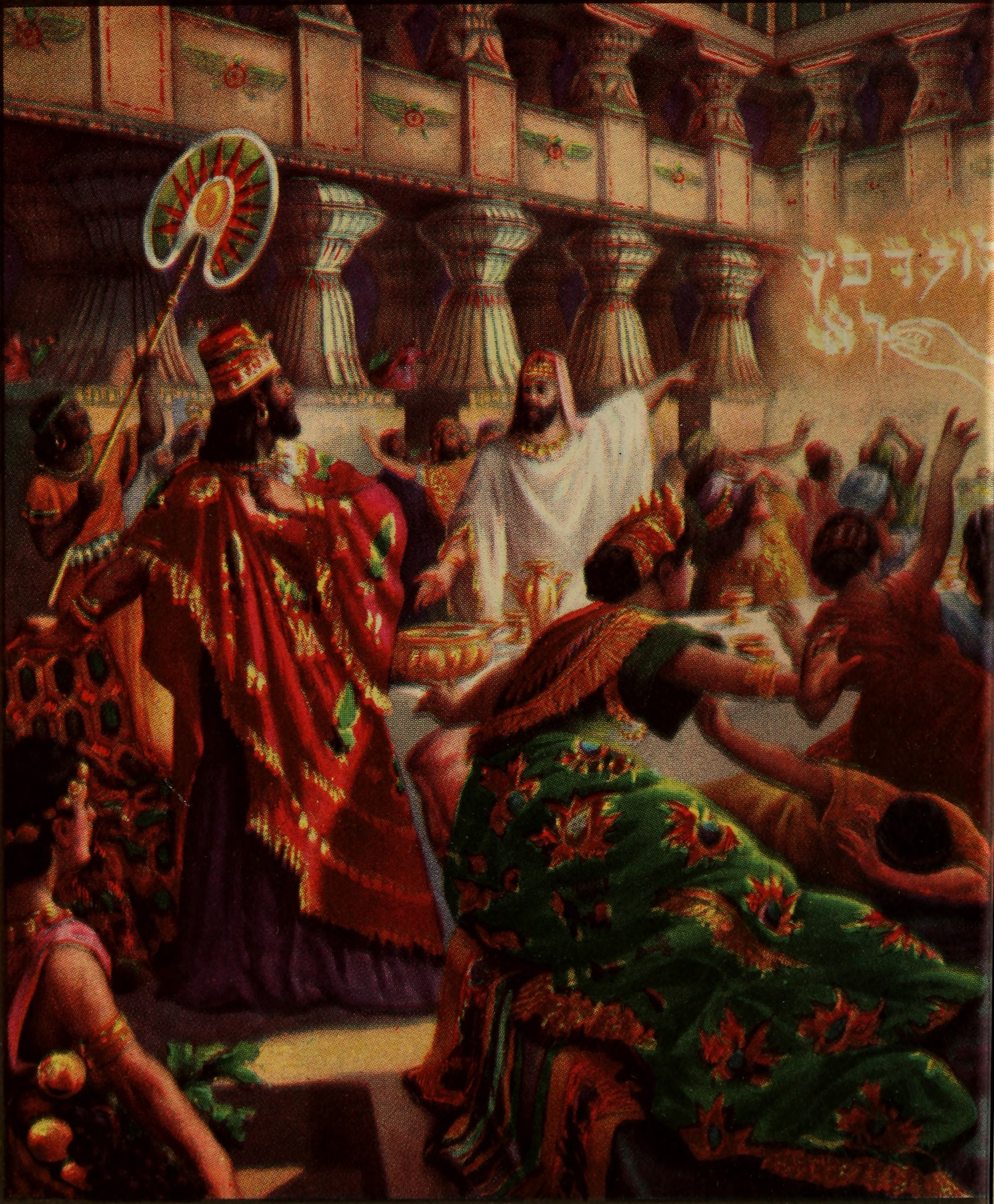
Depiction of Belshazzar seeing "the writing on the wall" by Adolf Hult (1919)

The broad consensus among scholars is that the Book of Daniel was compiled shortly after the Maccabean Revolt in the 160s BC. The story of Belshazzar's feast is thus deemed historical fiction, and several details are not consistent with historical facts. Belshazzar is portrayed as the king of Babylon and "son" of Nebuchadnezzar, though he was actually the son of Nabonidus—one of Nebuchadnezzar's successors—and he never became king in his own right, nor did he lead the religious festivals as the king was required to do. In the story, the conqueror who inherits Babylon is Darius the Mede, but no such individual is known to history. This is typical of the "tale of court contest" in which historical accuracy is not an essential element.

=== Portrayal in later Jewish tradition ===
In the Book of Daniel, Belshazzar is not malevolent (he rewards Daniel and raises him to high office). The later authors of the Talmud and the Midrash emphasize the tyrannous oppression of his Jewish subjects, with several passages in the Prophets interpreted as referring to him and his predecessors. For example, in the passage, "As if a man did flee from a lion, and a bear met him" (Amos 5:19), the lion is said to represent Nebuchadnezzar, and the bear, equally ferocious if not equally courageous, is Belshazzar. The Babylonian kings are often mentioned together as forming a succession of impious and tyrannical monarchs who oppressed Israel and were therefore foredoomed to disgrace and destruction. Isaiah 14:22, "And I will rise up against them, saith the Lord of hosts, and cut off from Babylon name and remnant and son and grandchild, saith the Lord", is applied to the trio: "Name" to Nebuchadnezzar, "remnant" to Amel-Marduk, "son" to Belshazzar, and "grandchild" Vashti (ib.). The command given to Abraham to cut in pieces three heifers (Genesis 15:9) as a part of the covenant established between him and his God was thus elucidated as symbolizing Babylonia, which gave rise to three kings, Nebuchadnezzar, Amel-Marduk, and Belshazzar, whose doom is prefigured by this act of "cutting to pieces" (Midrash Genesis Rabbah xliv.).

The Midrash literature enters into the details of Belshazzar's death. Thus the later tradition states that Cyrus and Darius were employed as doorkeepers of the royal palace. Belshazzar, being greatly alarmed at the mysterious handwriting on the wall, and apprehending that someone in disguise might enter the palace with murderous intent, ordered his doorkeepers to behead anyone who attempted to force an entrance that night, even though such person should claim to be the king himself. Belshazzar, overcome by sickness, left the palace unobserved during the night through a rear exit. On his return, the doorkeepers refused to admit him. In vain did he pled that he was the king. They said, "Has not the king ordered us to put to death anyone who attempts to enter the palace, though he claims to be the king himself?" Suiting the action to the word, Cyrus and Darius grasped a heavy ornament forming part of a candelabrum, and with it shattered the skull of their royal master (Shir ha-Shirim Rabbah 3:4).

== See also ==
- Cylinders of Nabonidus
- Cultural depictions of Belshazzar
- List of biblical figures identified in extra-biblical sources
