= Nabu-shum-lishir =

- Prince of Babylon
- Died: 602 BC (?); Babylonia (?)
- Akkadian: Nabû-šum-līšir
- Dynasty: Chaldean dynasty
- Father: Nabopolassar

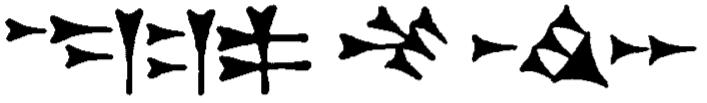
Nabu-shum-lishir (Babylonian cuneiform: Nabû-šum-līšir, meaning "Nabu, make the name prosper!") was a Babylonian prince of the Chaldean dynasty and the second eldest son of Nabopolassar, the founder of the Neo-Babylonian Empire. He may have attempted to usurp the Babylonian throne from his elder brother, Nebuchadnezzar II, in 602 BC.

== Biography ==
Nabu-shum-lishir was the second son of Nabopolassar, the founder of the Neo-Babylonian Empire. He thus had one older brother, Nebuchadnezzar II, and he had at least one younger brother, Nabu-zer-ushabshi. Though Nebuchadnezzar had always been their father's designated heir, Nabu-shum-lishir was recognised by Nabopolassar as Nebuchadnezzar's 'equal brother', a dangerously vague title. Upon Nabopolassar's death in 605 BC, Nebuchadnezzar, away on campaign at that time, hastened back to Babylon, possibly in order to ensure that his brothers did not try to usurp the throne. Nabu-shum-lishir does not appear to have made a move to attempt to take the throne at this time.

In the Babylonian Chronicles, the entry for the year 602 BC mentions Nabu-shum-lishir, but as the text is fragmentary, it is in an unclear context. Given that princes are rarely mentioned after their father's reigns if they did not become kings, and Nebuchadnezzar's early reign being shaky, it is possible that Nabu-shum-lishir revolted against his elder brother in this year to attempt to take the throne. Though the damage to the text makes this idea speculative and conjectural, Nabu-shum-lishir is not mentioned in any documents after 602 BC, perhaps reinforcing the theory that he led an unsuccessful revolt.
