= Kaššaya =

- Princess of Babylon
- Born: 6th century BC
- Died: 6th century BC
- Spouse: Neriglissar (?)
- Dynasty: Chaldean dynasty
- Father: Nebuchadnezzar II
- Mother: Amytis of Media (?)

Kaššaya or Kashshaya was a princess of Babylon, daughter of Nebuchadnezzar II. Kaššaya was the eldest daughter of king Nebuchadnezzar II (605-562 BC). She is documented as a historical person in cuneiform economic texts. One of the preserved cuneiform texts mentions that, in her father's 31 years of reign, she received large quantities of blue wool for making ullâku robes.

According to another text, she gave the land to the temple of the goddess Ishtar in the city of Uruk. Kaššaya might have been the wife of Neriglissar, who in August 560 BC, after murdering his brother-in-law Amel-Marduk, took the throne of Babylon. It is also possible that Neriglissar was married to another of Nebuchadnezzar's daughters.

== Etymology ==
The name Kaššaya occurs several times in Neo-Babylonian texts and is written in various ways in Akkadian: Kaš-šá-a, Kaš-ša-a and Kaš-šá-a-a (as a masculine name). The Kaššaya pronunciation is suggested by the last two spellings. Johann J. Stamm originally classified Kaššaya as a name of unknown origin, but typical of the neo-Babylonian affectionate nickname given by husbands to their wives. Although the origin of the name is unclear, the Chicago Assyrian Dictionary (CAD) suggests that the name may be etymologically derived from the word 'kaššu "Kassite". If so, the name was probably given in honor of the Kassite dynasty that reigned in Babylon centuries before her lifetime.
