= Nitocris of Babylon =

Queen of Babylon

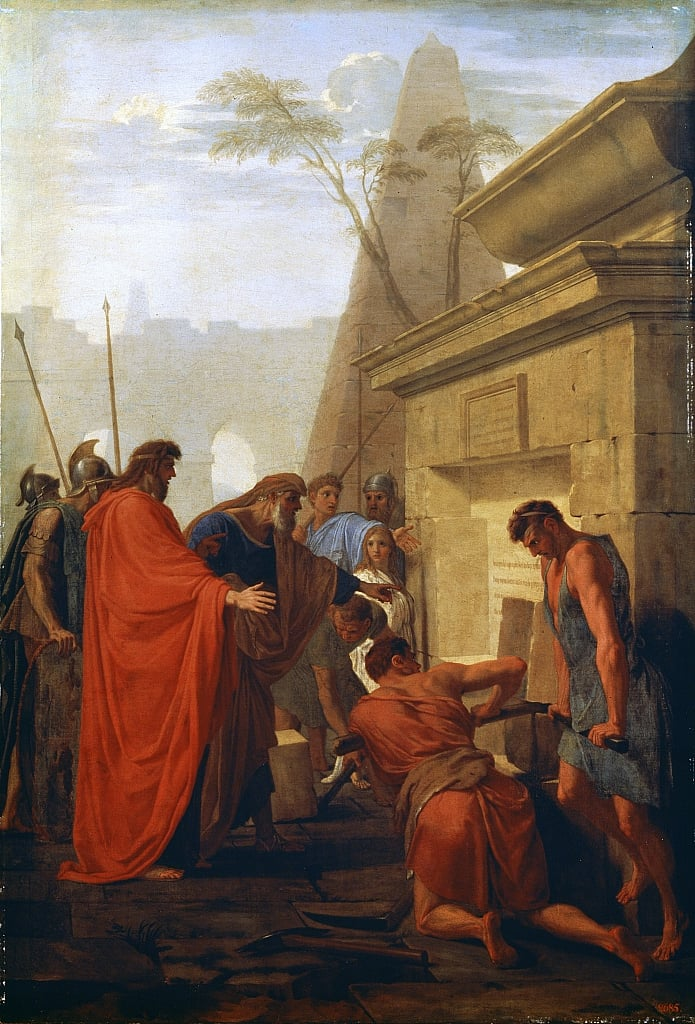
Darius Forcing the Babylonians to Open the Tomb of Nitocris (a painting by Eustache Le Sueur, ca 1649)

Nitocris of Babylon (c. 550 BC) is an otherwise unknown queen regnant of Babylon described by Herodotus in his Histories.

According to Herodotus' Histories, among sovereigns of Babylon two were women, Semiramis and Nitocris.

Nitocris is credited by Herodotus with various building projects in Babylon. She is also said to have tricked Darius I by placing her tomb above a gate so that no Persian could pass below and enter through. According to the account, Darius was lured in by a mysterious inscription that served as a trap for greedy kings. According to Herodotus, she was the mother of Nabonidus (Greek Labynētos) against whose son an expedition was launched by Cyrus the Great. Dougherty and Beaulieu identify the son as Belshazzar.

If this is the case, she is most likely the queen in the story of Belshazzar's feast, and she is identified as such in Handel's oratorio Belshazzar.

== Identity of Nitocris ==
In the past, various hypotheses have been proposed to link her with one or several known persons:

- Naqi'a, wife of Sanherib, known for building activities
- Adad-happe, the historical mother of Nabonidus, last king of Babylon
- an otherwise unknown wife of Nebuchadnezzar II or a daughter of his. The latter view is the most commonly accepted.

It is possible as well that Nabonidus married one of Nebuchadnezzar II's daughters, a marriage which could potentially have been secured through his mother's influence. Not only would such a connection explain Nabonidus's rise to the throne (being connected to the royal family) but it would also explain later historical traditions in which Nabonidus's son, Belshazzar, is described as Nebuchadnezzar II's descendant; as in the Book of Daniel in the Hebrew Bible, where Belshazzar is referred to as Nebuchadnezzar II's (grand)son. William H. Shea proposed in 1982 that Nitocris may tentatively be identified as the name of Nabonidus's wife and Belshazzar's mother.

In the mid-19th century, it was conjectured that Nabonidus married Queen regnant Nitocris, a daughter of Nebuchadnezzar, and that Nitocris was credited with many constructions as co-sovereign with her husband.

== See also ==
- Kings of Babylon
