= Puqudu =

Ancient Aramean tribe

The term Puqudu or Piqudu (or in the Bible, Peqod or Pekod) refers to a prominent Aramean tribe and its associated region in southern or eastern Babylonia. They lived along the eastern edge of Elam and in the area near Uruk and the Tigris. Their tribal name is sometimes spelled with an accent mark as Puqūdu, and the members of the tribe are sometimes referred to as Puqūdian, Puqūdians, or Puqudaeans (e.g. in the Nimrud Letters). Some older publications use Pukud.

The Puqudu, known from governmental archives of Assyria, were "prominent between the mid-8th century and 626 B.C.", although their presence is documented in Babylonia at least as early as the ninth century. It is not certain when they migrated into the area.

They appear to have been a loosely associated set of clans, forming alliances for war but not governed under any form of permanent centralized government. In common with other Aramean tribes of the area, including the Gambūlu, Ruʾa, and Gurasimmu, the Puqudu had multiple leaders at the same time. There is not enough surviving evidence to speak more specifically about their political organization. Their way of life appears to have been largely rural, with many caring for herds. The surviving records concerning Puqudu and other groups point to an ongoing tension between the largely rural Aramean tribes, including the Puqudu, and the rural elite of Assyria.

== History ==
Cuneiform name of Neriglissar (6th century BCE)

Tiglath-Pileser III, king of Assyria (745–722), conquered the Puqudu, and destroyed Hilimmu and Pillutu, two of their cities. He relocated many of the defeated Puqudu into other parts of his empire. Although incorporated into the Assyrian Empire, the Puqudu repeatedly rebelled against Assyria and engaged in warfare against Assyrian provincial governors and Assyrian allies in the late eighth century and well into the seventh.

From 721 to 710, Babylonia was ruled by Marduk-apla-iddina II, who successfully fought a war at the beginning of his reign to make it independent of Assyria and its ruler Sargon II (king of Assyria 721-705). In 710, Sargon defeated Marduk-apla-iddina and his coalition, which included the Puqudu.

Sargon integrated the Puqudu land into the Gambulu province in 710, but still found it necessary to carry out military expeditions, which were ultimately successful, against Bit-Yakin (a Chaldean tribe) and the Puqudu between 709 and 707. After the death of Sargon and the accession of his son Sennacherib (ruled 705–681), the Puqudu again participated in rebellions in 704 and 691.

From 652–648, a war broke out between Ashurbanipal, king of Assyria, and his rebellious brother Shamash-shum-ukin, governor of Babylon, who claimed the right to rule the entire empire. The Puqudu, along with other Aramean groups, sided with Shamas-shum-ukin, who was defeated and died in 648. Preserved letters indicate that during the war Puqudians managed to enter Uruk and take prisoners. However, as Ashurbanipal began to gain the upper hand, Puqudians were deported several times to other parts of the empire.

Two biblical references, both concerned with the destruction of Jerusalem in 587 by Babylon, make passing reference to the Puqudu. Spelled in Hebrew (which largely lacks vowels) as pqd, the Hebrew version of the name is now traditionally pronounced as Pekod. Ezekiel, interpreting the destruction of Jerusalem as judgment by God, says, "Assuredly, Oholibah, thus said the Lord God: I am going to rouse against you the lovers from whom you turned in disgust, and I will bring them upon you from all around – the Babylonians and all the Chaldeans, [the people of] Pekod, Shoa, and Koa, and all the Assyrians with them, all of them handsome fellows, governors and prefects, officers and warriors, all of them riding on horseback." Jeremiah mentions Pekod briefly as a region of Babylon in an oracle of judgment against Babylonia: "Advance against her – the land of Merathaim – / And against the inhabitants of Pekod; / Ruin and destroy after them to the last / – says the Lord – / Do just as I have commanded you."

The Babylonian emperor Neriglissar (reigned 560-556), was a member of the Puqudu tribe, and the son of the governor of the Puqudu district within the Babylonian Empire.

== Sources ==
- Beaulieu, Paul-Alain (2013). "Arameans, Chaldeans, and Arabs in Cuneiform Sources from the Late Babylonian Period". Arameans, Chaldeans, and Arabs in Babylonia and Palestine in the First Millennium B.C. Wiesbaden: Harrassowitz Verlag. pp. 31–55.
- Brinkman, John A. (1977). "Notes on Arameans and Chaldeans in Southern Babylonia in the Early Seventh Century B.C." Orientalia. 46 (2): 304–325. JSTOR 43074768.
- Fales, Frederick M. (2011). "Moving around Babylon: On the Aramean and Chaldean Presence in Southern Mesopotamia". Babylon: Wissenskultur in Orient und Okzident. Berlin-Boston: Walter de Gruyter. pp. 91–112.
- Frame, Grant (2013). "The Political History and Historical Geography of the Aramean, Chaldean, and Arab Tribes in Babylonia in the Neo-Assyrian Period". Arameans, Chaldeans, and Arabs in Babylonia and Palestine in the First Millennium B.C. Wiesbaden: Harrassowitz Verlag. pp. 87–121.
- Gzella, Holger (2015). A Cultural History of Aramaic: From the Beginnings to the Advent of Islam. Leiden-Boston: Brill. ISBN 9789004285101.
- Streck, Michael P. (2014). "Babylonia". The Aramaeans in Ancient Syria. Leiden: Brill. pp. 297–318. ISBN 9789004229433.
- Lipiński, Edward (2000). The Aramaeans: Their Ancient History, Culture, Religion. Leuven: Peeters Publishers. ISBN 9789042908598.
- Younger, Kenneth Lawson (2016). A Political History of the Arameans: From Their Origins to the End of Their Polities. Atlanta: SBL Press. ISBN 9781628370843.
- Zadok, Ran (2013). "The Onomastics of the Chaldean, Aramean, and Arabian Tribes in Babylonia during the First Millennium". Arameans, Chaldeans, and Arabs in Babylonia and Palestine in the First Millennium B.C. Wiesbaden: Harrassowitz Verlag. pp. 261–336. ISBN 9783447065443.
