= 530 BC =

530 BC in various calendars
- Gregorian calendar: 530 BC; DXXX BC
- Ab urbe condita: 224
- Ancient Egypt era: XXVI dynasty, 135
- Pharaoh: Amasis II, 41
- Ancient Greek Olympiad (summer): 62nd Olympiad, year 3
- Assyrian calendar: 4221
- Balinese saka calendar: N/A
- Bengali calendar: −1123 – −1122
- Berber calendar: 421
- Buddhist calendar: 15
- Burmese calendar: −1167
- Byzantine calendar: 4979–4980
- Chinese calendar: 庚午年 (Metal Horse); 2168 or 1961 — to — 辛未年 (Metal Goat); 2169 or 1962
- Coptic calendar: −813 – −812
- Discordian calendar: 637
- Ethiopian calendar: −537 – −536
- Hebrew calendar: 3231–3232
- Hindu calendars
- Vikram Samvat: −473 – −472
- Shaka Samvat: N/A
- Kali Yuga: 2571–2572
- Holocene calendar: 9471
- Iranian calendar: 1151 BP – 1150 BP
- Islamic calendar: 1186 BH – 1185 BH
- Javanese calendar: N/A
- Julian calendar: N/A
- Korean calendar: 1804
- Minguo calendar: 2441 before ROC 民前2441年
- Nanakshahi calendar: −1997
- Thai solar calendar: 13–14
- Tibetan calendar: ལྕགས་ཕོ་རྟ་ལོ་ (male Iron-Horse) −403 or −784 or −1556 — to — ལྕགས་མོ་ལུག་ལོ་ (female Iron-Sheep) −402 or −783 or −1555

The year 530 BC was a year of the pre-Julian Roman calendar. In the Roman Empire, it was known as year 224 Ab urbe condita. The denomination 530 BC for this year has been used since the early medieval period, when the Anno Domini calendar era became the prevalent method in Europe for naming years.

== Events ==
=== By place ===
==== Asia ====
- Cyrus II is killed in battle against unknown tribes and succeeded by Cambyses II.

=== By topic ===
==== Chronology ====
- Royal Arch Masons use this year for dating their documents Anno Inventionis, after the beginning of the Second Temple by Zerubbabel.

==== Art and architecture ====
- The Temple of Apollo at Delphi is built (approximate date).
- Peplos Kore, from the Acropolis in Athens, is made. It is now at Acropolis Museum, Athens (approximate date).
- Kroisos Kouros, from a cemetery at Anavysos near Athens, is made. It is now at the National Archaeological Museum, Athens (approximate date).
- The Siphnian Treasury in Delphi is begun (approximate date).
- Battle between the Gods and the Giants, fragments of the north frieze of the Siphnian Treasury, from the Sanctuary of Apollo, Delphi, is begun (approximate date). It is now at the Delphi Archaeological Museum.
- Ennigaldi-Nanna's Museum at Ur is established, the earliest known public museum with the oldest known museum labels (approximate date).

== Births ==
- Aristides, Athenian statesman (d. 468 BC)
- Onomacritus, Greek compiler of oracles (approximate date) (d. 480 BC)
- Pheidippides, Greek runner (approximate date) (d. c. 490 BC)

== Deaths ==
- December — Cyrus the Great, ruler of Persia (b. 576 or 600 BC)
- Battus III of Cyrene, Greek king of Cyrenaica
- Spargapises, Massagetae general
