= Ennigaldi-Nanna =

Babylonian princess

- Princess of Babylon

High priestess of Ur
- Reign: 547 BC – before 500 BC
- Predecessor: Daughter of Nebuchadnezzar I (12th century BC)
- Dynasty: Chaldean dynasty
- Father: Nabonidus
- Mother: Nitocris (?)

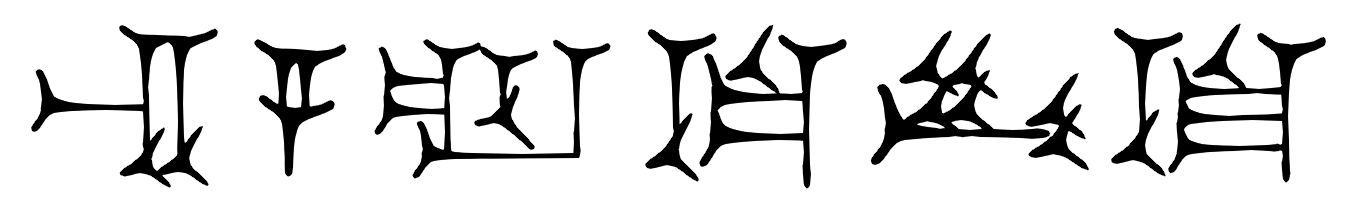
Ennigaldi-Nanna (Babylonian cuneiform: En-nígaldi-Nanna), also known as Bel-Shalti-Nanna (Note: Sometimes (incorrectly) spelled Bel-shalti-narrar.) and commonly called just Ennigaldi, was a princess of the Neo-Babylonian Empire and high priestess (entu) of Ur. As the first entu in six centuries, serving as the "human wife" of the moon-god Sin, Ennigaldi held large religious and political power. She is most famous today for founding a museum in Ur c. 530 BC. Ennigaldi's museum showcased, cataloged, and labelled artifacts from the preceding 1,500 years of Mesopotamian history and is often considered to have been the first museum in world history.

== Family ==
Ennigaldi was a daughter of Nabonidus, who ruled as king of Babylon from 556 to 539 BC. She had at least three siblings: the brother Belshazzar and the sisters Ina-Esagila-risat and Akkabuʾunma. Nabonidus was genealogically unconnected to previous Babylonian kings but he might have been married to a daughter of the previous ruler Nebuchadnezzar II (r. 605–562 BC), which would make Ennigaldi and her siblings into Nebuchadnezzar's grandchildren. The name of their mother is unknown but she may have been the figure remembered in later tradition under the name Nitocris.

Nabonidus had great interest in archaeology. He conducted extensive excavations, included more allusions to past rulers in his writings than most other kings, and is the earliest known person in history to attempt to chronologically date archaeological artifacts. Ennigaldi's interest in archaeology and history probably stemmed from her father.

== Career ==
=== High priestess ===
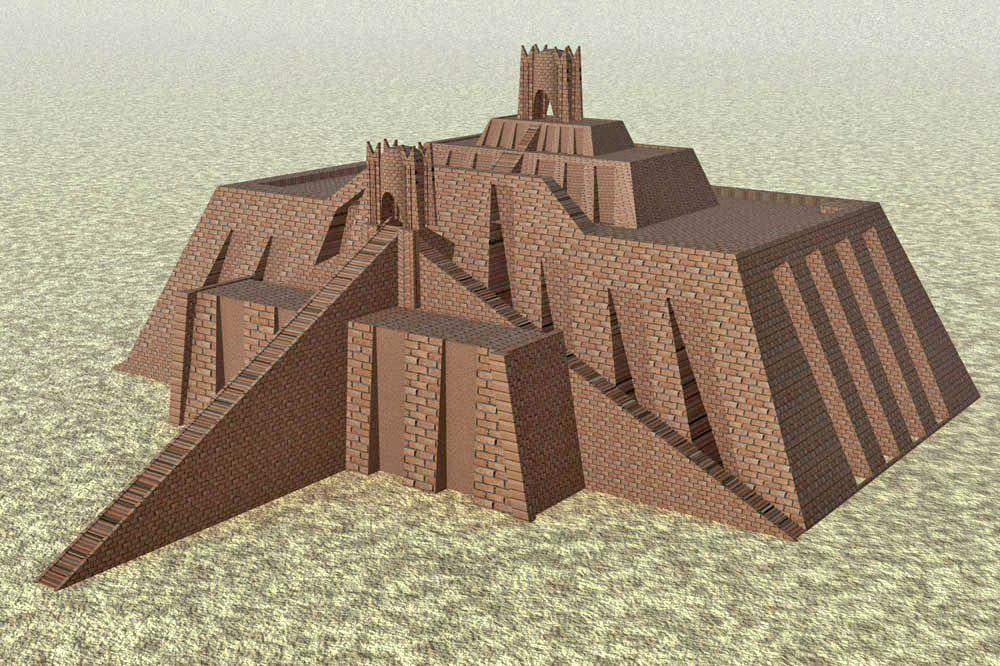
Reconstruction of the Ziggurat of Ur

In 547 BC, Nabonidus revived the office of entu ("high priestess") of Ur, which had been vacant since the time of Nebuchadnezzar I in the 12th century BC, and named Ennigaldi to this office. The entu was devoted to the moon-god Sin (known as Nanna in Sumerian times) and was the highest-ranking priestess in the country, supposedly divinely elected by the god himself and revealed through omens. All known entu were of royal blood, having been sisters or daughters of kings. Nabonidus was supposedly inspired to restore the office after a partial lunar eclipse in 554 BC, which he interpreted as an omen, and the find of a stele created by Nebuchadnezzar I showing the investiture of that king's daughter as entu. According to Nabonidus, he selected Ennigaldi as entu only after having learnt through lengthy divination that she was the choice of Sin. The name Ennigaldi-Nanna was in all likelihood assumed at this time as her priestess name, since it means "Nanna requests an entu".

As entu, Ennigaldi would have devoted much of her religious time in the evenings to worship of Sin in a small blue room on top of the Ziggurat of Ur. Her official dwelling was a building called the giparu, located adjacent to the ziggurat. The giparu had been in ruins for centuries but was rebuilt for Ennigaldi on the orders of Nabonidus. The most important part of the religious role of the entu was to serve as the human wife of the god Sin and to perform rites relating to this sacred marriage. What these rites entailed is poorly known. The entu also had to pray for the life of the king, who served as the living embodiment of Babylonia's prosperity, and had to provide comfort and adornment for the goddess Ningal, Sin's divine consort. The entu also served as the manager of the considerable estates and wealth belonging to the temple complex of Ur. In addition to these duties, Ennigaldi also ran, and possibly taught in, a school for aspiring priestesses from upper-class Babylonian families. By the time Ennigaldi became entu, this school had been in continuous operation for more than eight hundred years. The school taught a special women's scribal dialect called Emesal.

=== Museum curator ===
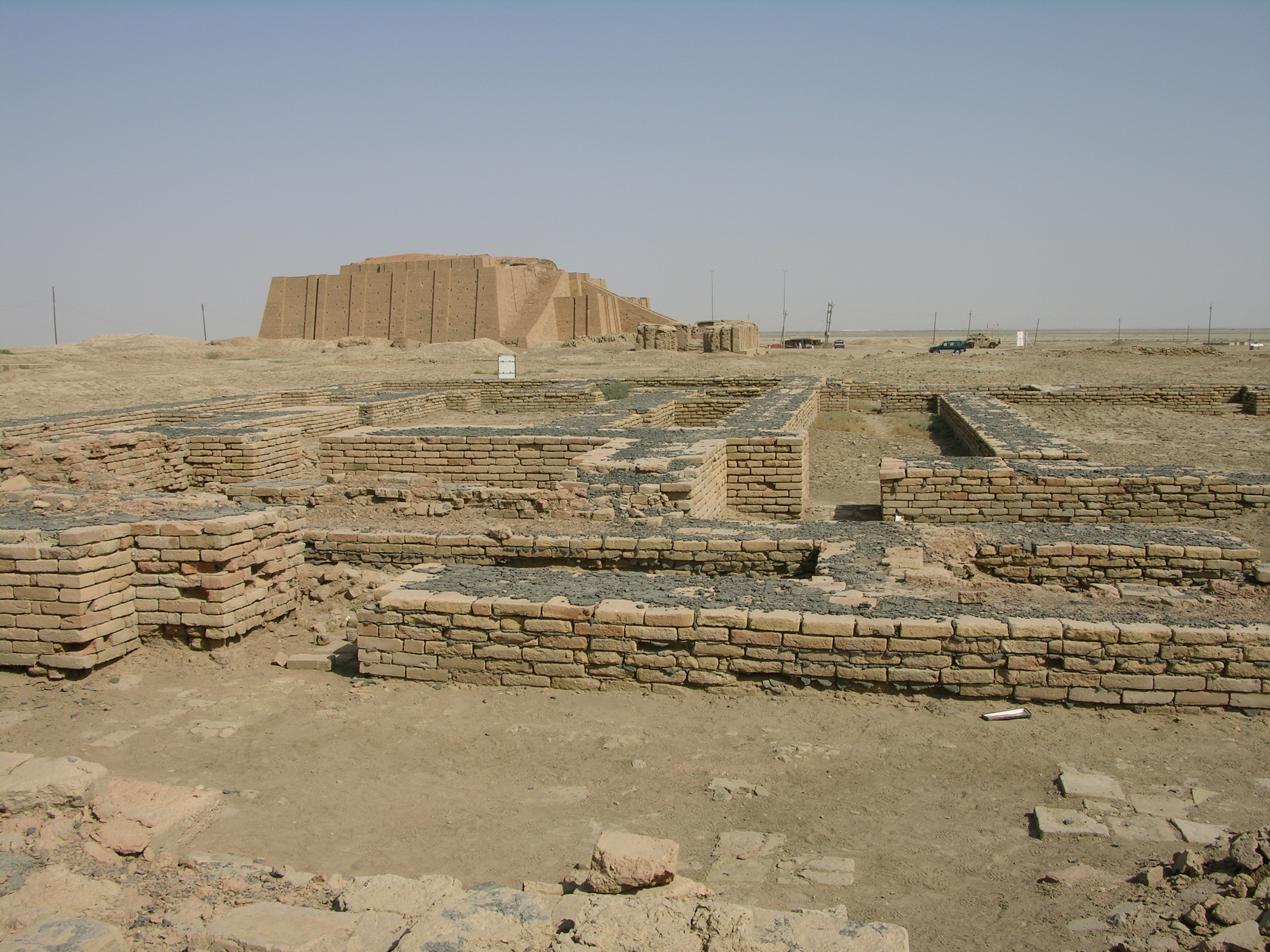
Ruins of Ennigaldi-Nanna's museum

The reign of Ennigaldi's father came to an end when the Neo-Babylonian Empire was conquered by Cyrus the Great of the Achaemenid Empire in 539 BC. Nabonidus appears to have been allowed to live and retire in peace, perhaps to Carmania. The change in government does not appear to have impacted Ennigaldi's position in Ur since she c. 530 BC founded a museum containing artifacts from past Mesopotamian civilizations, located about five hundred feet southeast of the ziggurat. Ennigaldi's museum is often considered the first museum in world history.

Some of the objects on display may have been personally excavated by Ennigaldi and her father. Most of the artifacts dated to the 20th century BC, though the collection covered a timespan of about 1,500 years (c. 2100–600 BC). Ennigaldi developed a research program around the museum's collection of artifacts and she was presumably herself responsible for cataloging and labelling the collections. Among the items on display were artifacts that had once belonged to Nebuchadnezzar II, a ceremonial mace-head, a Kassite boundary stele (kudurru), as well as a statue of Shulgi, a famous Sumerian king of Ur (r. 2094–2046 BC), which had been carefully restored to preserve the inscriptions on it. The museum included clay tablets and cones with inscriptions containing descriptions of the objects (i.e. museum labels) written in three different languages, including Sumerian. The museum was also equipped with tablets listing the objects on display; the earliest known museum catalogs.

The subsequent fate of Ennigaldi is unknown. She is believed to have been the last occupant of the entu office. Ennigaldi's museum ceased operations at the latest around 500 BC; changing climate conditions (including a change in the course of the Euphrates river, a drought, and the recession of the Persian Gulf) caused Ur to rapidly decline under Achaemenid rule and rendered the city uninhabited by that time.

== Legacy ==
The ruins of Ennigaldi's museum were discovered by the British archaeologist Leonard Woolley during excavations of the Ur temple complex in 1925. The neatly arranged objects of various different ages allowed Woolley to quickly identify the site as the remains of a museum.

Ennigaldi is one of 998 historically impactful women memorialized in the artwork The Dinner Party by Judy Chicago.

The Devonian brachiopod Spinatrypa ennigaldinannae was named in her honour.
