= Ur-Nammu =

King of Ur

Ur-Nammu 𒌨𒀭𒇉
- King of Sumer and Akkad
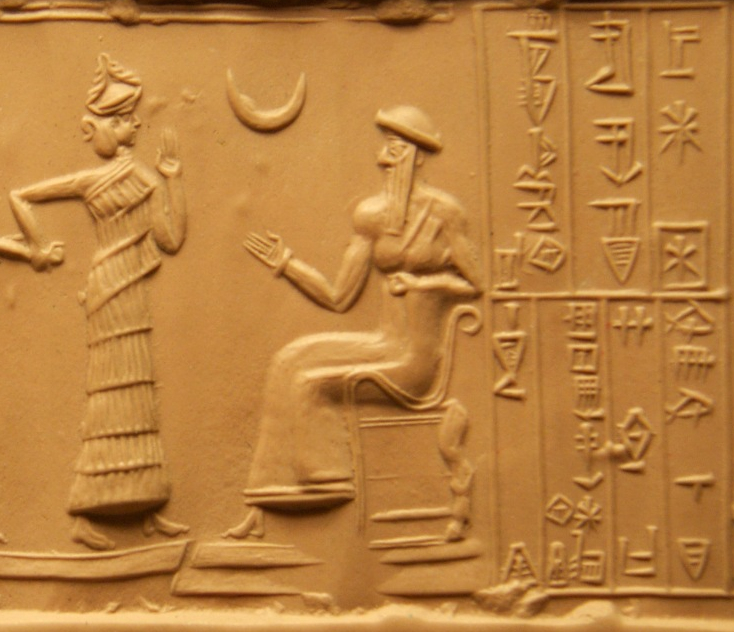
- Enthroned King Ur-Nammu, founder of the Third Dynasty of Ur, on a cylinder seal. Inscription of the upper segment: "Ur-Nammu, the Great man, King of Ur". The name of King Ur-Nammu (𒌨𒀭𒇉) appears vertically in the upper right corner.

King of Ur
- Reign: c. 2112 – c. 2094 BC
- Predecessor: Utu-hengal
- Successor: Shulgi
- Died: c. 2094 BC
- Consort: Watartum
- Issue: Shulgi; Ama-barag; En-nirgal-ana
- Dynasty: 3rd Dynasty of Ur
- Religion: Sumerian religion

Ur-Nammu (or Ur-Namma, Ur-Engur, Ur-Gur, Sumerian: 𒌨𒀭𒇉; died c. 2094 BC) was a Sumerian king who founded the Sumerian Third Dynasty of Ur, in southern Mesopotamia, following several centuries of Akkadian and Gutian rule. Though he built many temples and canals his main achievement was building the core of the Ur III Empire through military conquest. Ur-Nammu is chiefly remembered today for his legal code, the Code of Ur-Nammu, the oldest known surviving example in the world. He also initiated the construction of the Ziggurat of Ur. He held the titles of "King of Ur" and "King of Sumer and Akkad". His personal goddess was Ninsuna. In royal hymns of the Ur III period, Ur-Nammu of Ur and his son Shulgi describe Lugalbanda and Ninsun as their holy parents, and in the same context call themselves the brother of Gilgamesh.

== Reign ==
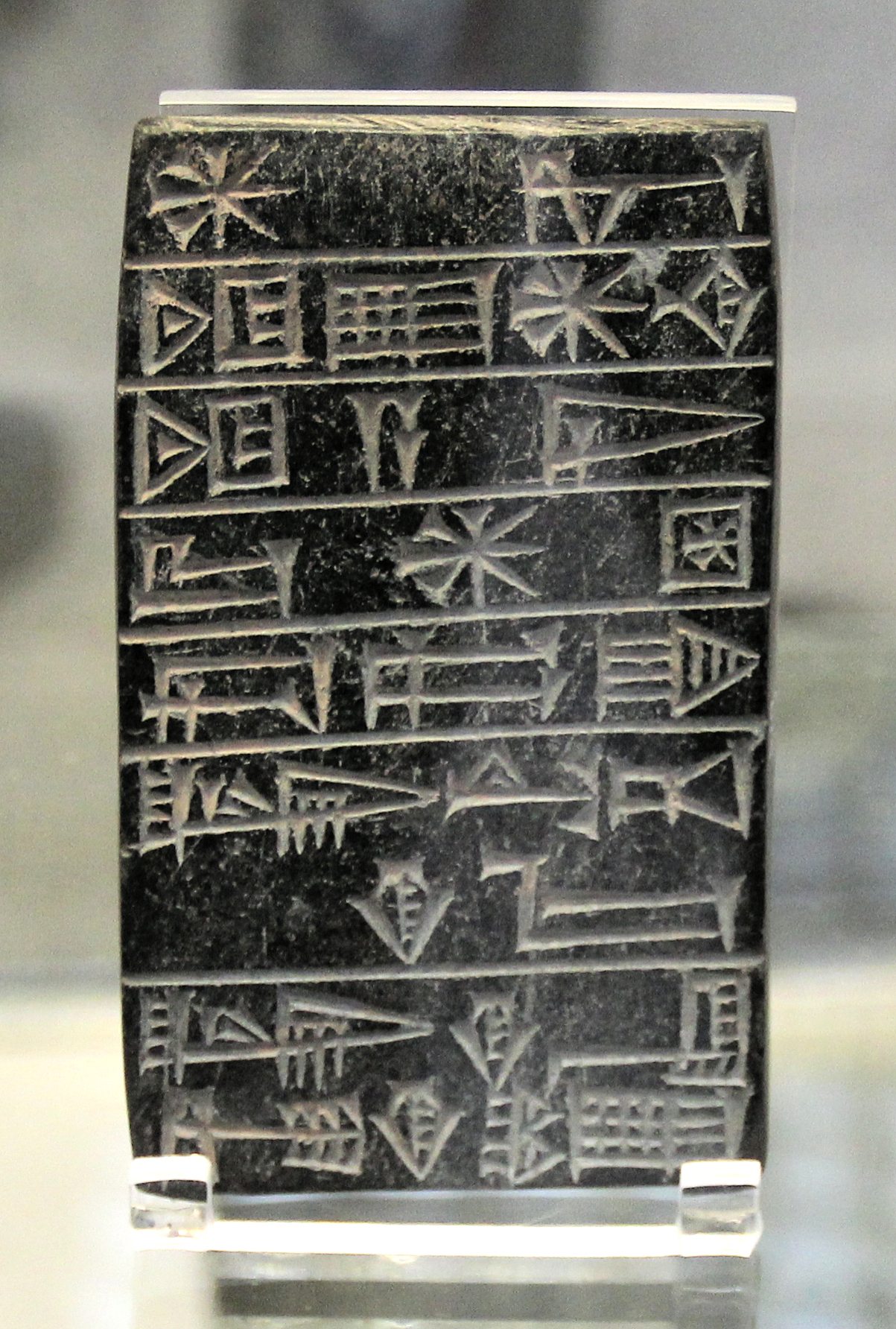
Ur-Nammu dedication tablet for the Temple of Inanna in Uruk. Inscription "For his lady Inanna, Ur-Nammu the mighty man, King of Ur and King of Sumer and Akkad": 𒀭𒈹 ^{D}inanna.... "For Inanna-" 𒎏𒂍𒀭𒈾 Nin-e-an-na.... "Ninanna," 𒎏𒀀𒉌 NIN-a-ni.... "his Lady" 𒌨𒀭𒇉 UR-NAMMU.... "Ur-Nammu" 𒍑𒆗𒂵 NITAH KALAG ga.... "the mighty man" 𒈗𒋀𒀊𒆠𒈠 LUGAL URIM KI ma.... "King of Ur" 𒈗𒆠𒂗𒄀𒆠𒌵𒆤 LUGAL ki en gi ki URI ke.... "King of Sumer and Akkad"

According to the Sumerian King List, Ur-Nammu reigned for 18 years. Year-names are known for 17 of these years, but their order is uncertain. One year-name of his reign records the devastation of Gutium, while two years seem to commemorate his legal reforms ("Year in which Ur-Nammu the king put in order the ways [of the people in the country] from below to above", "Year Ur-Nammu made justice in the land").

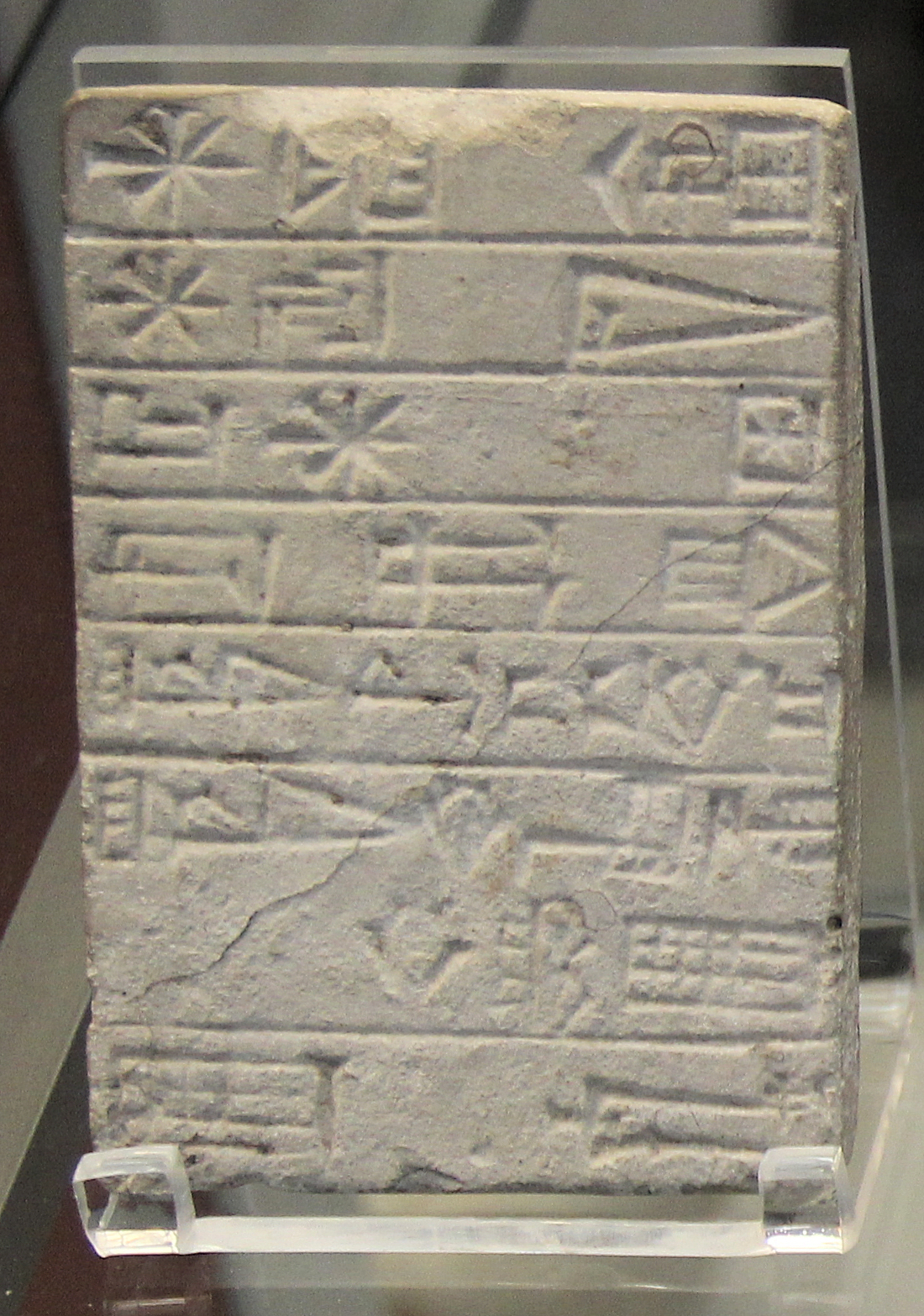
Ur-Nammu's dedication tablet for the temple of Ninsun in Ur: "For his lady Ninsun, Ur-Nammu the mighty man, King of Ur and King of Sumer and Akkad, has built her temple"

Among his military exploits were the conquest of Lagash and the defeat of his former masters at Uruk. He was eventually recognized as a significant regional ruler (of Ur, Eridu, and Uruk) at a coronation in Nippur, and is believed to have constructed buildings at Nippur, Larsa, Kish, Adab, and Umma. He was known for restoring the roads and general order after the Gutian period. In the interregnum after the fall of the Akkadian Empire, a number of cities became independent and an area in the northeast came under the control of Elam. Ur-Nammu in his Sumerian language inscriptions reports defeating a coalition of Kutik-Insusinak, Elamite ruler, and some other cities including Tutub and Eshnunna. It has been suggested that this was another name for the Elamite ruler Puzur-Inshushinak, about whom little is known. There is equal support for the idea that Puzur-Inshushinak was contemporary with Akkad ruler Naram-Sin a century earlier.

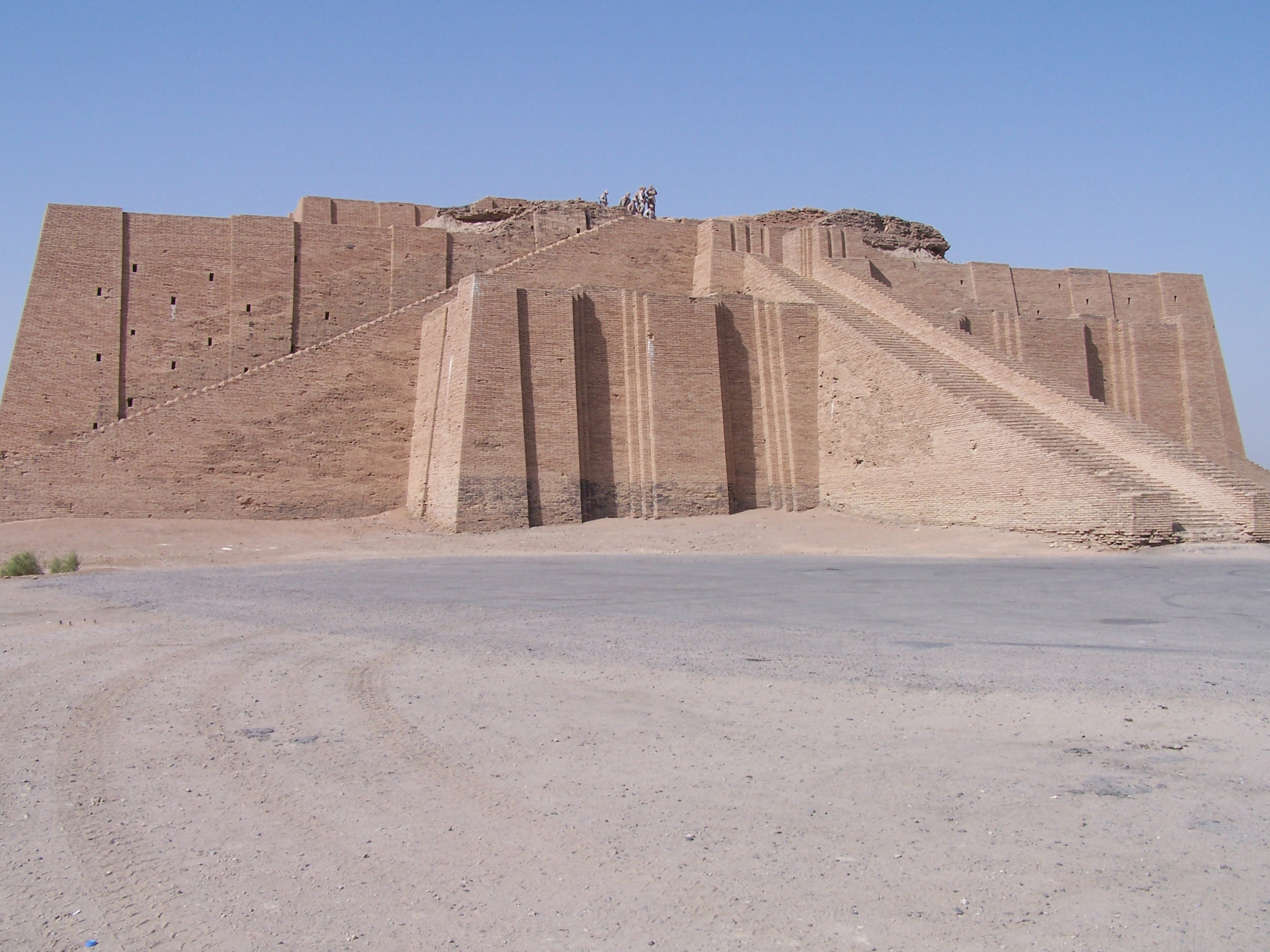
Ur-Nammu built the great Ziggurat of Ur

Ur-Nammu was also responsible for ordering the construction of a number of ziggurats, including the Great Ziggurat of Ur. It has been suggested, based on a much later literary composition, that he was killed in battle after he had been abandoned by his army. He was succeeded by his son Shulgi. One known daughter, Ama-barag, married a local man. The other known daughter was consecrated as the en-priestess of Nanna in Ur, taking the clerical name En-nir-gal-an-na (En-nirgal-ana). Two inscriptions found in Ur read:

" For the goddess Ningal, his [la]dy, or the [li]fe of Ur-Nammu, [m]ighty [man], king] of the lands of Sumer and Akkad, her father, En-nirgal-ana, [e]n of the god Nanna, dedicated (this object) to her"

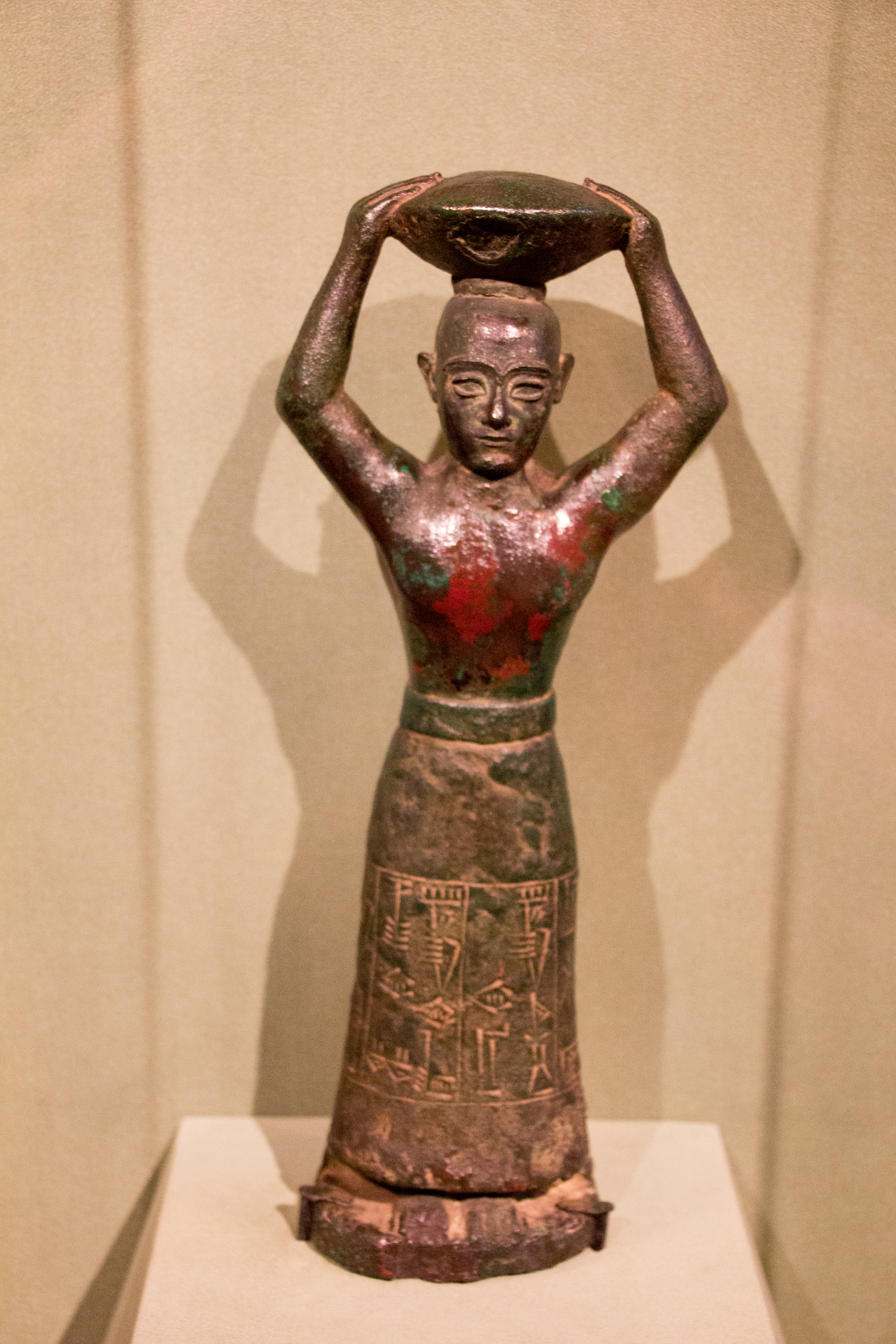
Foundation statue of Ur-Nammu

A later Sumerian literary composition known variously as "The Coronation of Ur-Nammu" and "Ur-Namma D" lists canals built by Ur-Nammu. It is known in three Old Babylonian Period recensions, from Nippur, Ur, and of an unknown provenance. There are a number of known Sumerian literary compositions about Ur-Namma, labeled from A to H. The other important later Sumerian literary work is the "Death of Ur-Nammu" (Ur-Namma A), variously described as a "hymn', "lamentation" or "wisdom". It describes the death, funeral, and passage through the underworld of Ur-Nammu. It is known from about 9 damaged tablets and fragments, held in various museums, which together allow restoration of much of the text. The description of Ur-Nammu's death is damaged, vague, and metaphoric, which has not stopped later scholars from interpreting it to say Ur-Nammu died in battle at the hands of his own troops.

Kings of the Third Dynasty of Ur also described Ninsun as their divine mother. For example, in Death of Ur-Nammu, Ninsun is described as the mother of the eponymous ruler and mourns the passing. By extension, the rulers also treated Gilgamesh as their divine brother, and Ur-Nammu's successor Shulgi called Lugalbanda his divine father.

== Deification debate ==
Ur-Nammu is notable for having been one of the few Mesopotamian kings of the third millennium BC who was not deified after his death. This is testified by the posthumous Sumerian literature which never includes the divine determinative before Ur-Nammu's name (this can be seen on the transliterations for the texts on ETCSL), the themes of divine abandonment in "The Death of Ur-Nammu", and the fact that Shulgi promoted his lineage to members of the legendary Uruk dynasty as opposed to Ur-Nammu. While some translations of Sumerian texts had included the divine determinative before Ur-Nammu's name, more recent evidence indicates this was a mistaken addition. Despite this, the belief that the king was deified after death has been expressed just as recently, demonstrating a lack of certainty on this issue (though these were written during the same year as the new interpretations of the evidence and thus could not refer to them). Sharlach has more recently noted that favour for Ur-Nammu not having been deified has been accepted by many scholars.

Whatever the current state of the deification debate, Ur-Nammu was clearly worshiped after his death. The palace at Tummal included funerary chapels for Ur-Nammu (e Tum-ma-al Ur-^{d}Namma) and his wife. His wife is known to have been named SI . A.tum, read as Watartum. Building materials came from as far away as Babylon, Kutha, and Adab. The ki-a-nag, or funerary offerings for Ur III ruler Ur-Nammu were carried out at Tummal. As his grave was not found in Ur, this has sparked speculation he was buried in Tummal.

== Year names of Ur-Nammu ==
Almost all of the year names of Ur-Nammu are known, documenting the major events of his reign. The main year names are:

- "Year Ur-Nammu (became) king"
- "Year Ur-Nammu made justice in the land"
- "Year in which the city wall of Ur was built"
- "Year in which the temple of Nanna was built"
- "Year Gutium was destroyed"
- "Year in which the temple of Enlil was built"
- "Year in which the canal 'en-erin-nun' was dug"
- "Year in which the temple of Ninsun in Ur was built"
- "Year in which the god Lugal-bagara was brought into his temple"

== The Ur-Nammu Stela ==
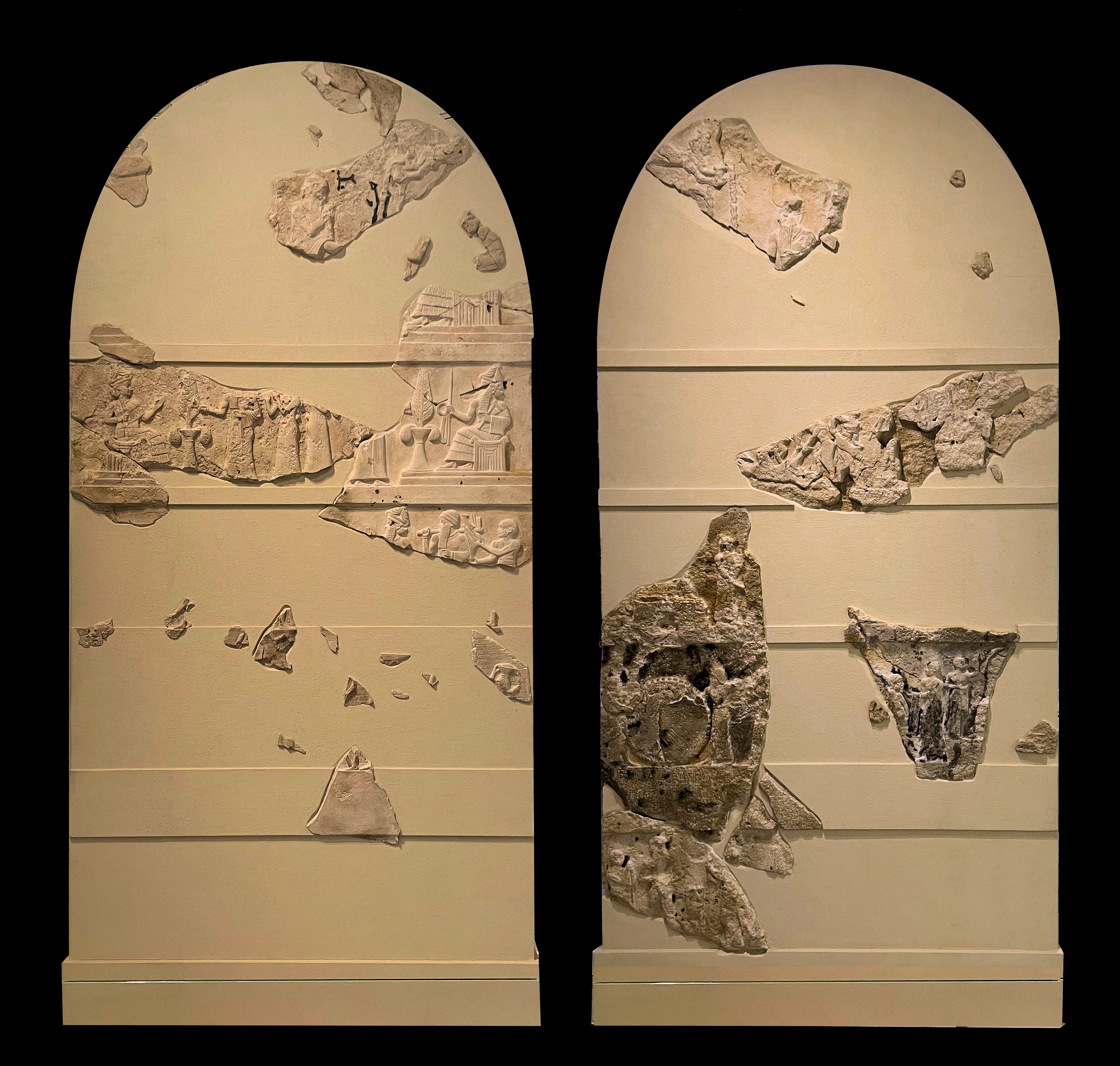
Stele of Ur-Nammu, University of Pennsylvania Museum of Archeology and Anthropology

A portion of the stela fragments were found during excavations at Ur in the 1920s, primarily in 1925, by Leonard Woolley under the auspices of the Joint Expedition of the Penn Museum and The British Museum in the temple precinct of Nanna.

But our main discovery was made in the courtyard of E-dublal-mah and in the gate-chamber leading to it, Here there were scattered over the pavement quantities of limestone fragments, large and small, which proved to be parts of one, or possibly two, huge stelae measuring five feet across and perhaps fifteen feet high, covered on both sides with finely executed reliefs. On some pieces the stone is astonishingly well preserved, on others its surface has suffered greatly by flaking and the action of salts; the reliefs had been intentionally smashed, and the fragments scattered all over the site [...].

— Leonard Woolley

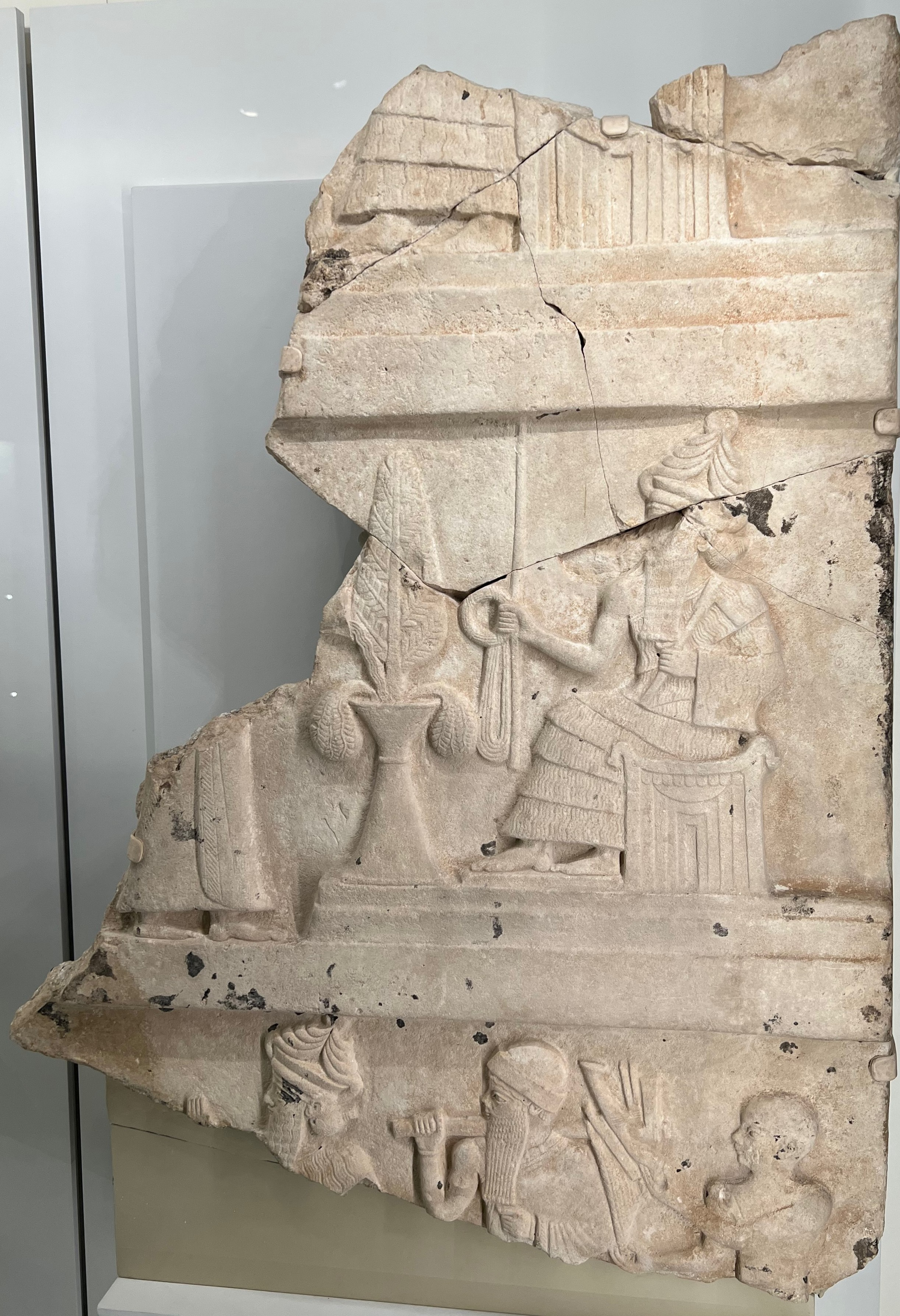
Ur Namma stele detail, Penn Museum

The first publisher of the stela called it the "Stela of the Flying Angels". Most fragments were found near the base. Some fragments had been moved and used for other purposes, including door sockets, and found on the Kassite period (c. 1595-1155 BC) levels, over half a millennium later. One side was noticeably better preserved than the other. One large fragment was recovered in the 1932-1933 season. As a few fragments were found in the level from fall of the Ur III Empire the excavator indicated that the stela had been shattered at the end of the reign of the final Ur III ruler Ibbi-Sin (c. 2028–2004 BC) and the pieces later used as convenient construction material by the Kassites.

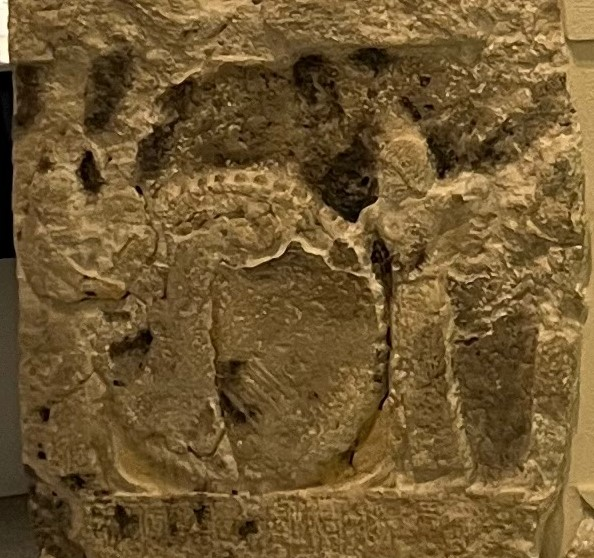
Ur Namma stele drummers Penn Museum

The limestone slab measures 3 meters high and 1.52 meters across, assuming it has been re-assembled properly. The stela fragments have been assembled several times, beginning in 1927, each time differently. The underlying basis for re-assembly is 1) one face is noticeably better preserved, 2) figures on the stela are larger the higher up they are, and 3) the edges of the stela are smooth. It is believed that there were originally five horizontal registers on each side. The identification and meaning of the surviving scenes has been much debated. When the stela was disassembled in 1989 for study mineralogical analysis showed that several fragments did not in fact belong to the stela. At the same time more fragments then in storage were identified as belonging to the stela of Ur-Nammu. This brought the fragment total to 106 including one fragment held at the British Museum (two others there are suspected as also belonging to the Ur-Nammu stela). This stela and the Utuhegal Stela were excavated at the same time and the finds divided between the sponsors. The issue of what fragments belong to this stela is still open. It is currently held at the University Museum of the University of Pennsylvania.

== Artifacts ==
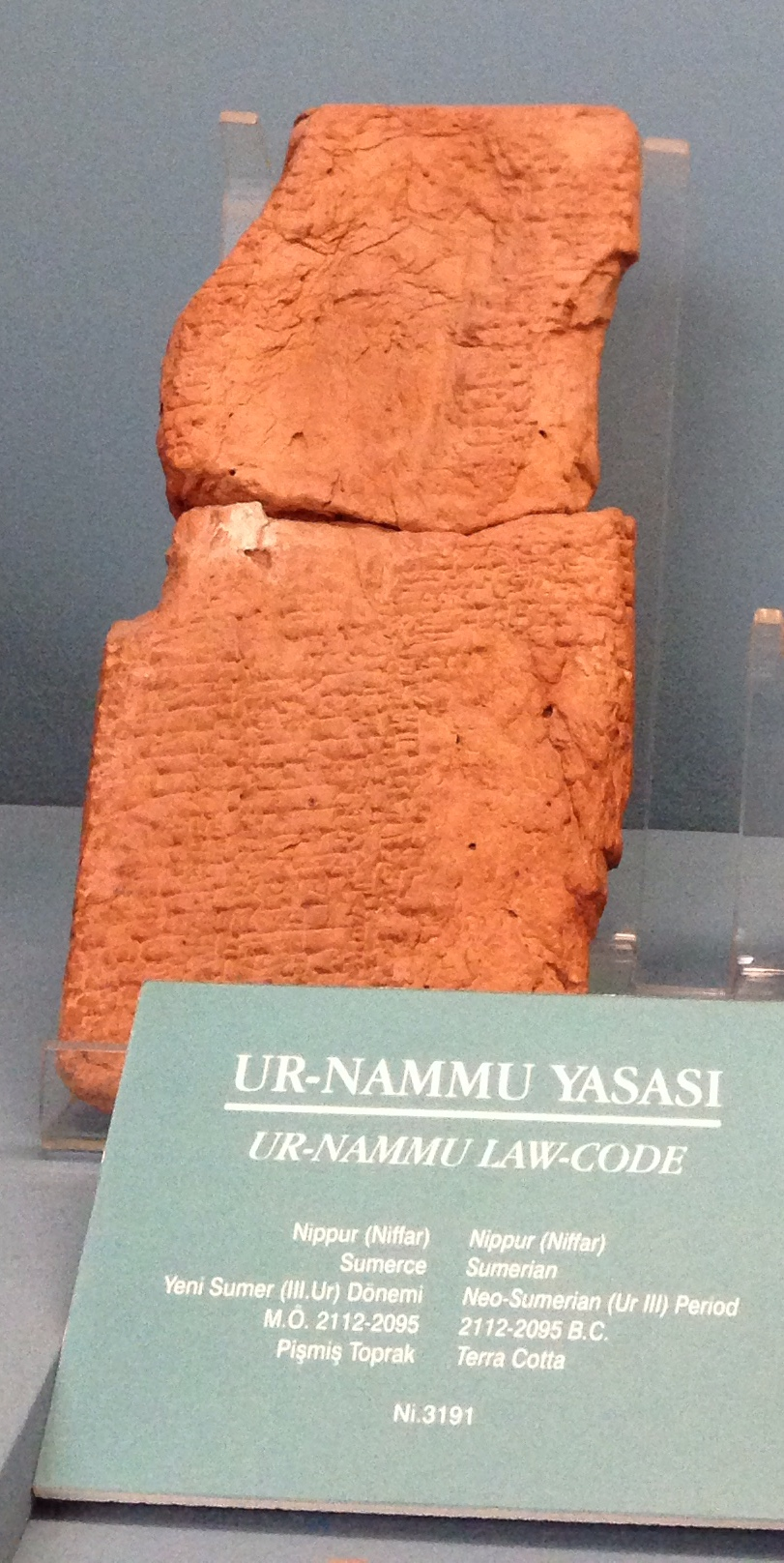
Code of Ur-Nammu

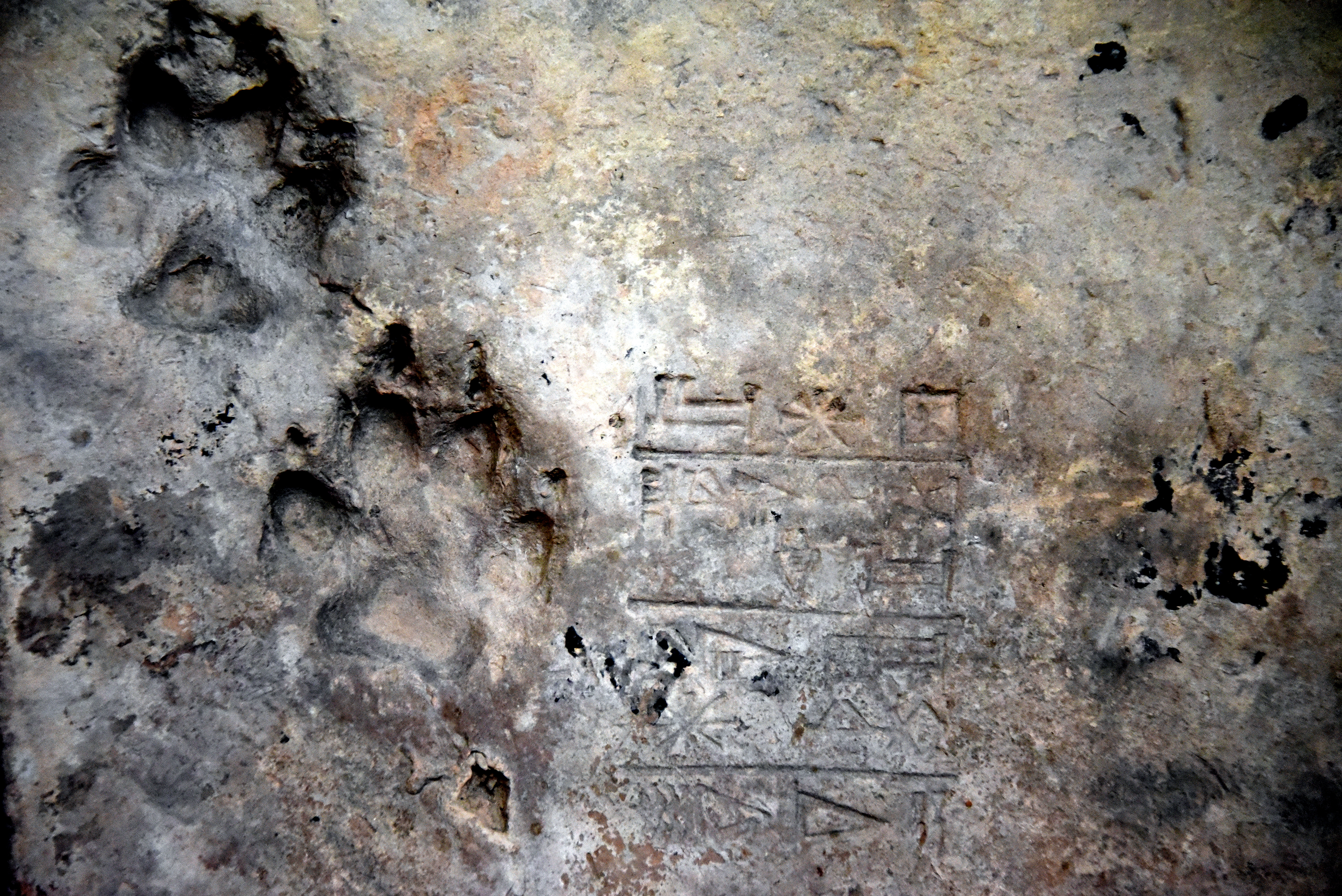
Fired mudbrick with stamped inscription of Ur-Nammu. There are two dog's paw-marks near one edge. From the Ziggurat of Ur. Ur III period. British Museum

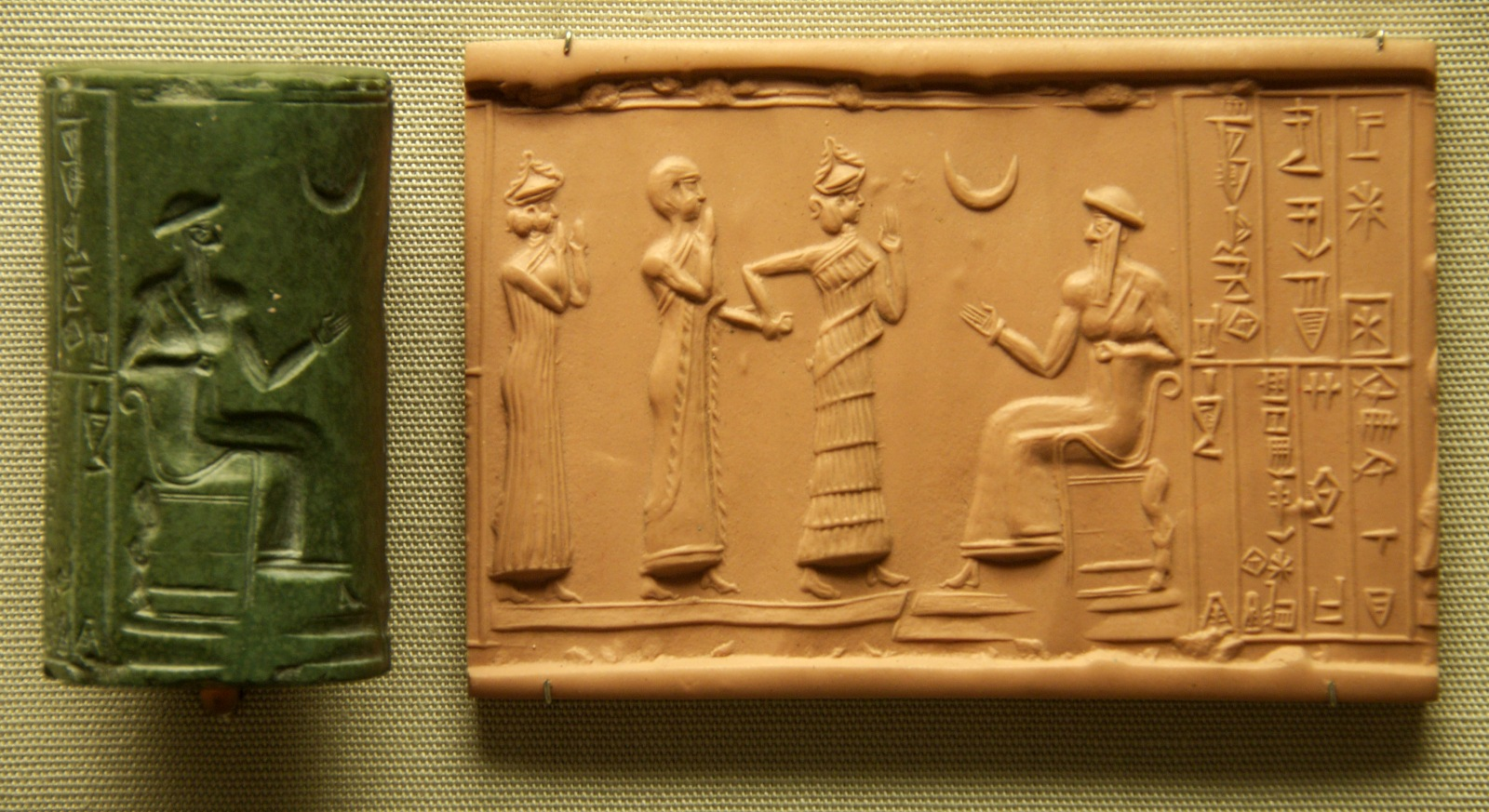
Cylinder seal of Ur-Nammu. British Museum.

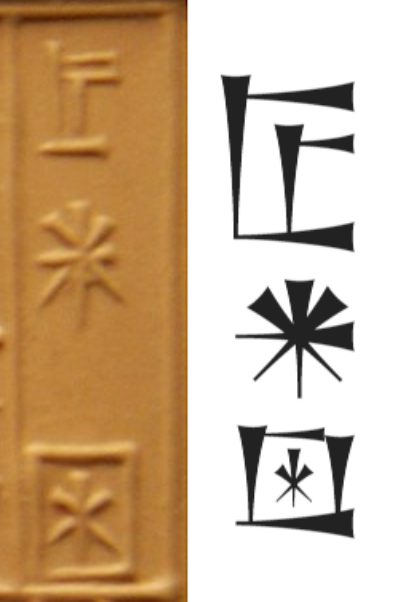
Name of Ur-Nammu on a seal, and standard cuneiform

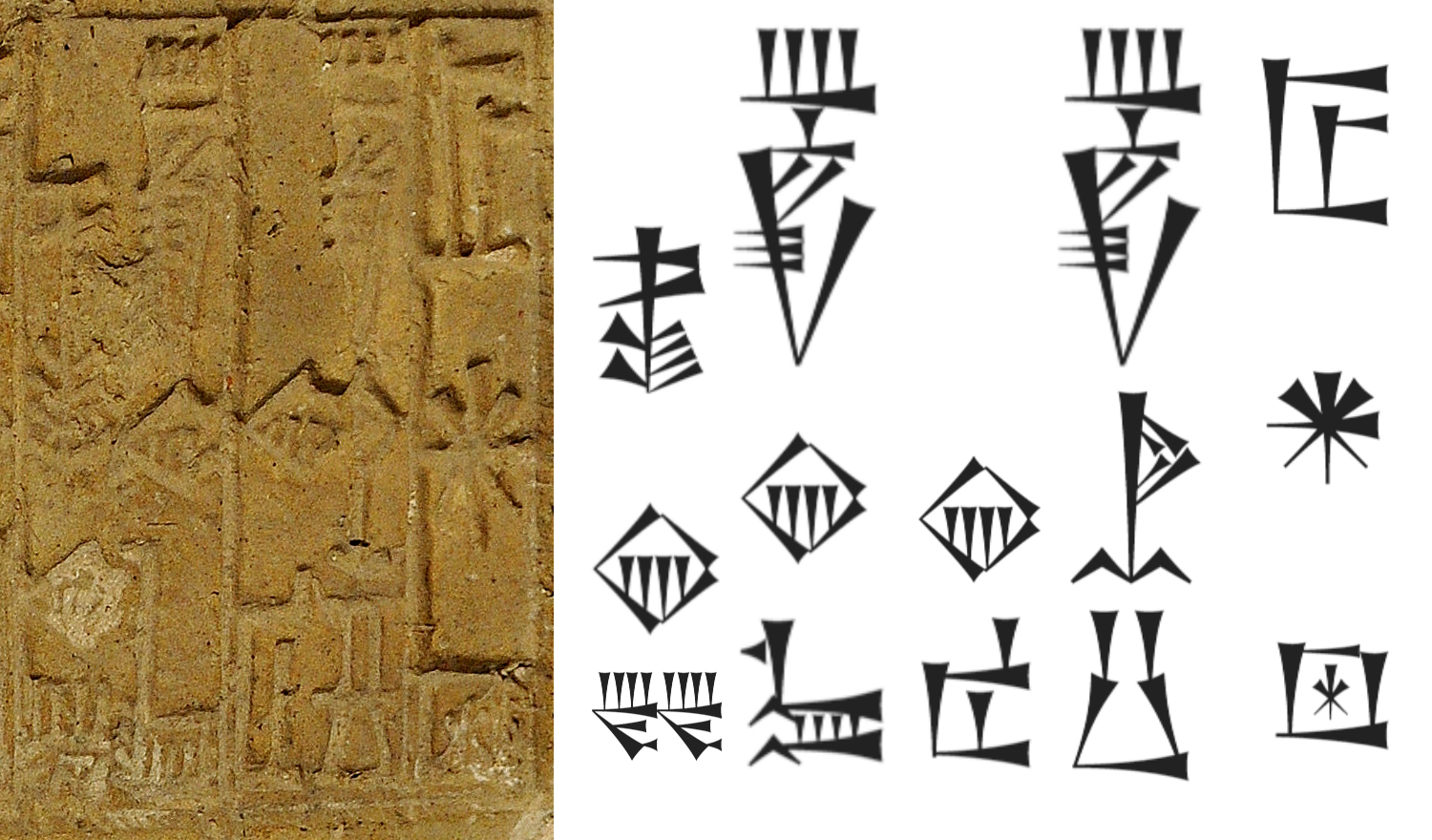
"Ur-Nammu, King of Ur, and King of Sumer and Akkad" (𒌨𒀭𒇉: Ur-Nammu 𒈗𒋀𒀊𒆠: Lugal Urimki 𒈠: ma 𒈗𒆠𒂗𒄀: Lugal Kiengir 𒆠𒌵: Kiuri)

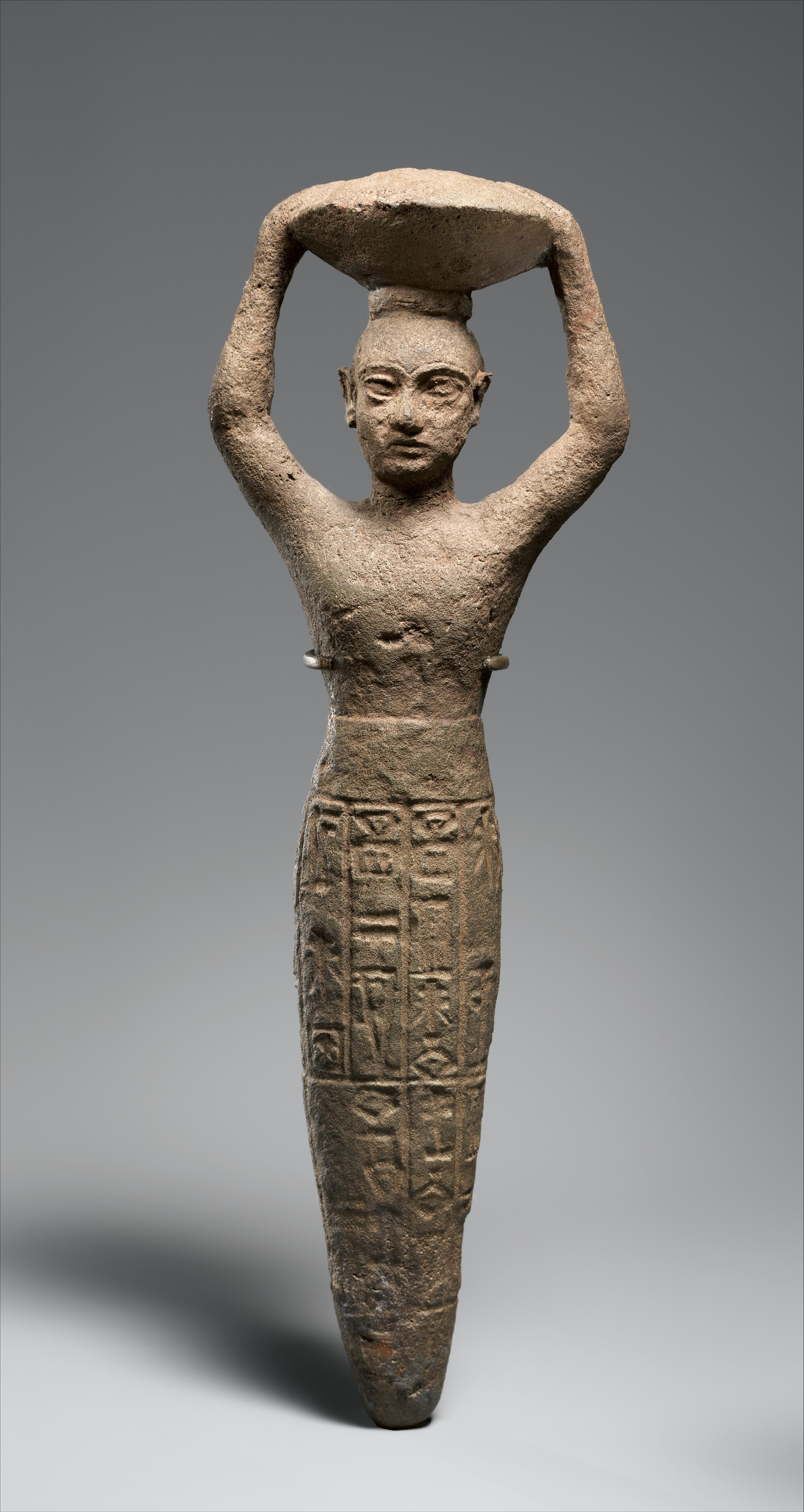
Foundation figure in the form of a peg surmounted by the bust of King Ur-Nammu

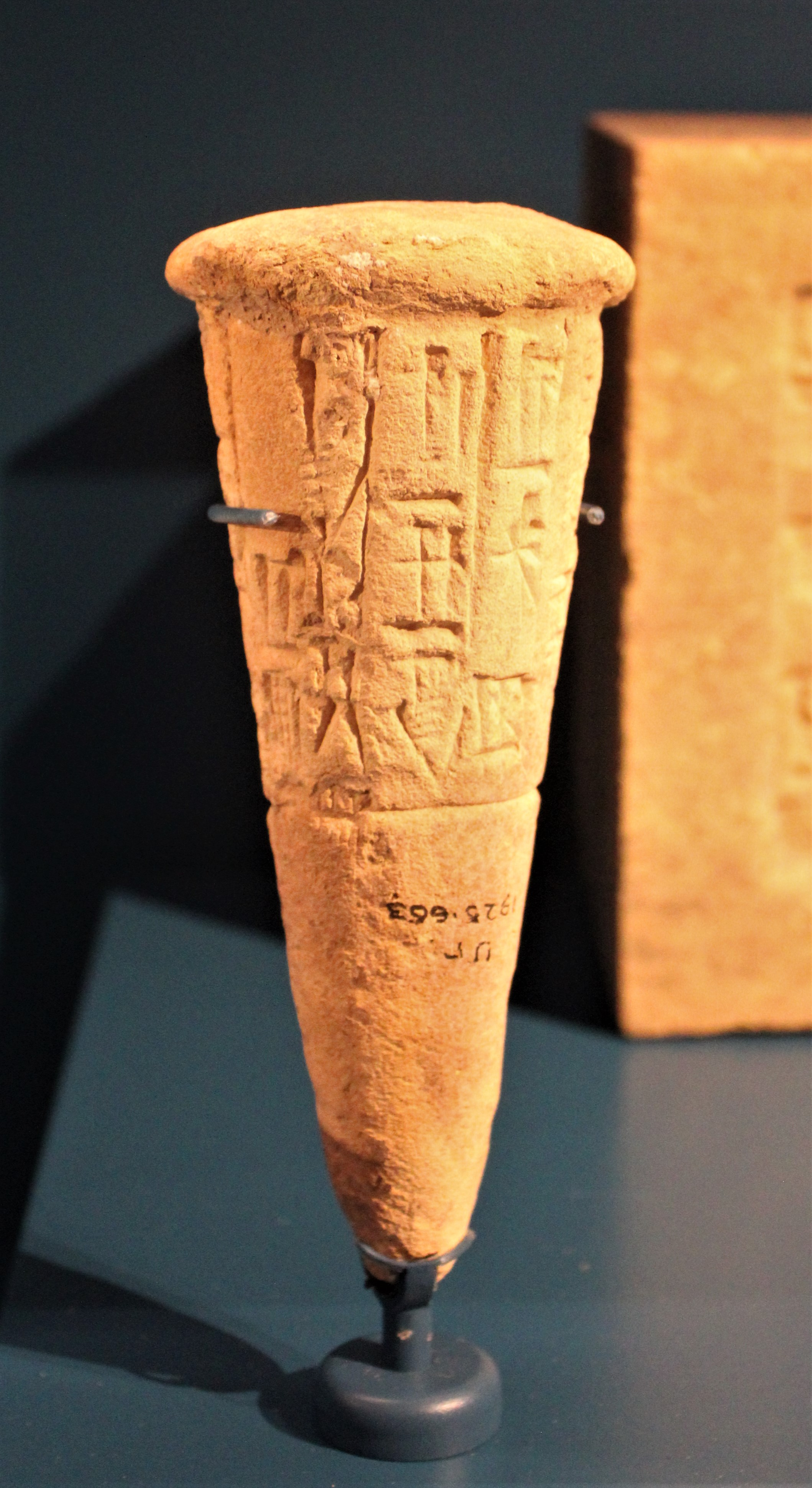
Ur Namma cone AN1925.633

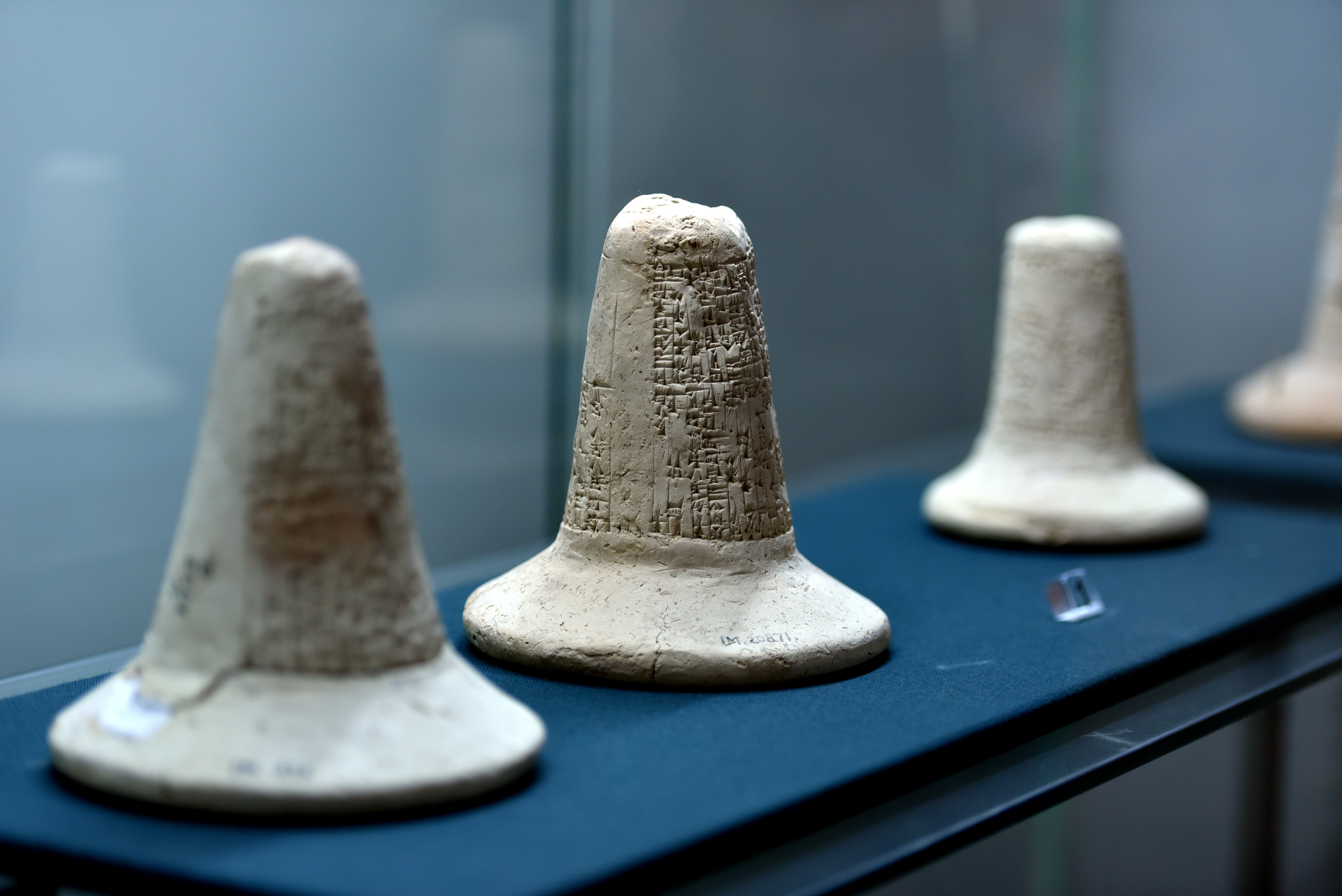
Three foundation cones from southern Iraq. The names of Gudea, Ur-Nammu, and Lipit-Ishtar. From Ur, Kish, and Warka, Iraq. Iraq Museum

== See also ==
- Nammu or Namma: the god Ur-Nammu was named after
- List of Mesopotamian dynasties
- Early and simple domes

Regnal titles
Preceded by Position established	King of Ur c. 2112 – c. 2094 BC	Succeeded by Shulgi
