= Museum label =

Label describing an object exhibited in a museum

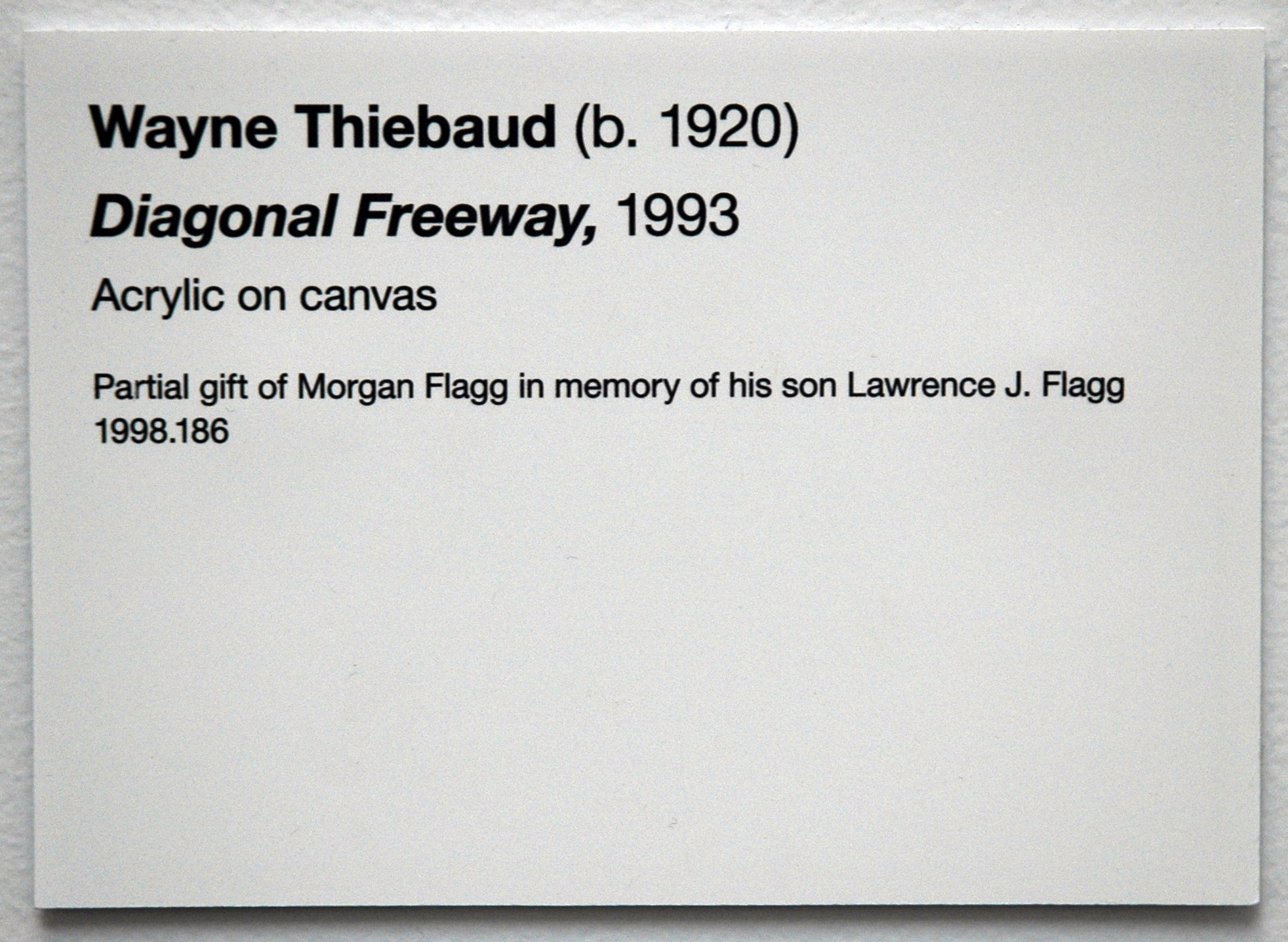
A typical museum label from the De Young Museum in San Francisco

A museum label is a label describing an object exhibited in a museum or one introducing a room or area.

At a minimum, museum labels identify the creator, title, date, location, and materials of the work, insofar as these can be known. Didactic information that can be related to wider ideas such as the history, culture, interpretation, and context of the work may also be included.

The first known museum labels are from Babylonian princess and high priestess Ennigaldi-Nanna's museum and date to circa 530 BCE.
