= Ennigaldi-Nanna's museum =

Earliest known museum

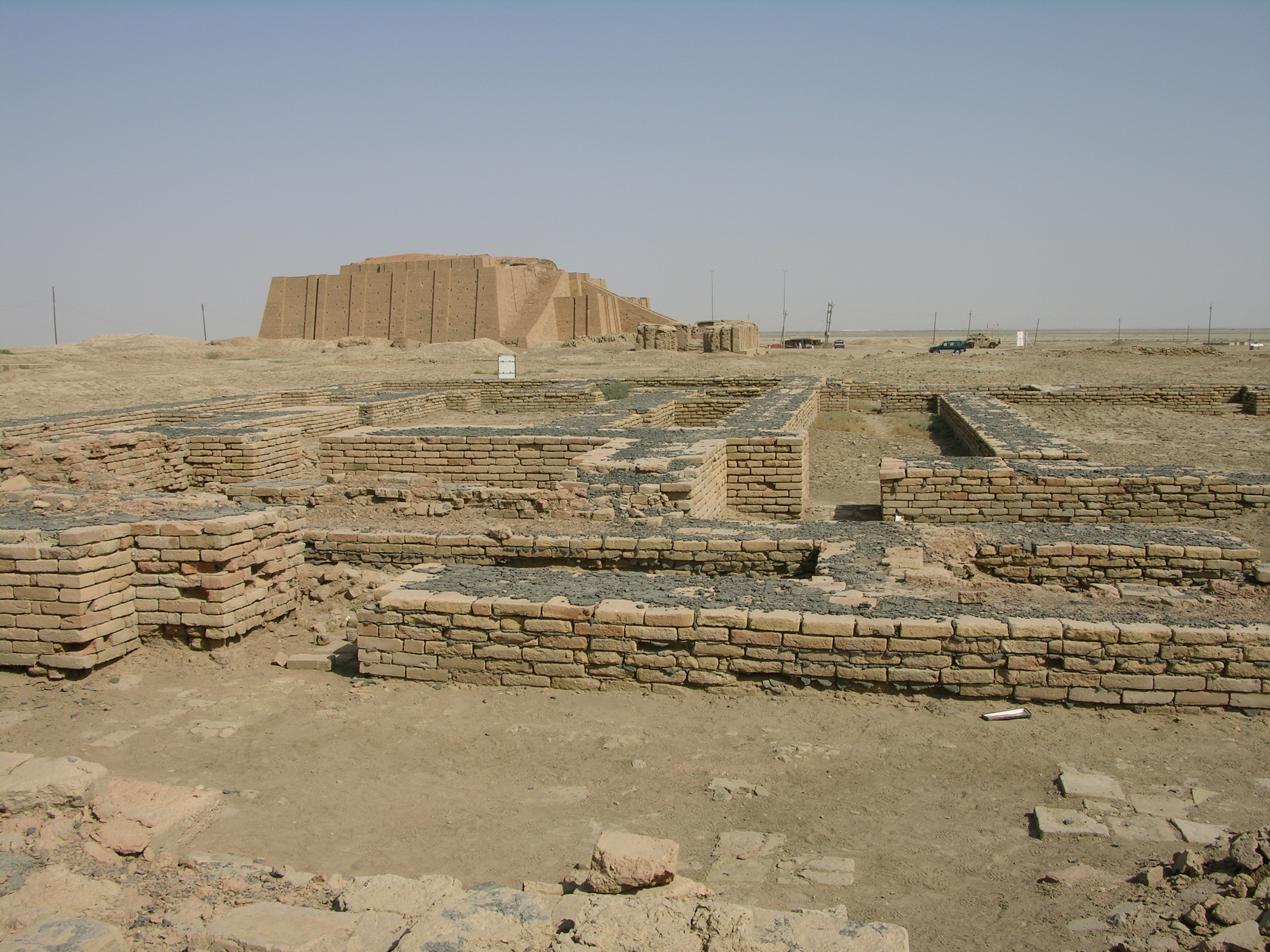
- Archeological excavations at the palace grounds

- Location within Iraq
- Established: Circa 530 BCE
- Dissolved: 5th century-BCE
- Location: Ancient Ur
- Coordinates: 30.961667°N 46.105278°E
- Type: Mesopotamian artifacts
- Curator: Princess Ennigaldi

Ennigaldi-Nanna's museum is the earliest known public museum. It dates to circa 530 BCE. The curator was Ennigaldi, the daughter of Nabonidus, the last king of the Neo-Babylonian Empire. It was in the state of Ur, in the modern-day Dhi Qar Governorate of Iraq, roughly 150 metres (490 ft) southeast of the famous Ziggurat of Ur.

== Discovery ==
The museum was discovered in 1925, when archaeologist Leonard Woolley excavated portions of the palace and temple complex at Ur. He found dozens of artifacts, neatly arranged side by side, whose ages varied by centuries. He determined that they were museum pieces, because they were accompanied by "museum labels"; clay drums written in three different languages, including Sumerian.

== History ==
The palace grounds that included the museum were at the ancient building referred to as E-Gig-Par, which included Ennigaldi's living quarters as well as subsidiary buildings.

Ennigaldi's father Nabonidus, an antiquarian and antique restorer, is known as the first serious archeologist. He taught her to appreciate ancient artifacts and influenced her to create her educational antiquity museum.

The artifacts came from the southern regions of Mesopotamia. Many had originally been excavated by Nabonidus and were from as early as the 20th century BCE. Some artifacts had been collected previously by Nebuchadnezzar. Some are thought to have been excavated by Ennigaldi herself.

Ennigaldi stored the artifacts in a temple next to the palace where she lived. She used the museum pieces to explain the history of the area and to interpret material aspects of her dynasty's heritage.

Some of these artifacts were:

- A kudurru, Kassite boundary marker (carved with a snake and emblems of various gods).
- Part of a statue of King Shulgi
- A clay cone that had been part of a building at Larsa.

== See also ==
- List of museums in Iraq

== Sources ==
- Anzovin, Steven; Podell, Janet (2000). Famous First Facts, International Edition: A Record of First Happenings, Discoveries, and Inventions in World History. H.W. Wilson. ISBN 978-0-8242-0958-2.
- Encyclopaedia Britannica (1997). The New Encyclopaedia Britannica. Vol. 2 (15 ed.). Encyclopædia Britannica, Incorporated. ISBN 978-0-85229-633-2.
- Casey, Wilson (6 October 2009). Firsts: Origins of Everyday Things That Changed the World. DK Publishing. ISBN 978-1-101-15946-0.
- HarperCollins (1997). HarperCollins atlas of archaeology. Borders Press in association with HarperCollinsPublishers. ISBN 978-0-7230-1005-0.
- Dolezal, Robert J. (1987). Reader's Digest Book of Facts. Reader's Digest Association. ISBN 978-0-89577-256-5.
- León, Vicki (1 January 1995). Uppity Women of Ancient Times. Conari Press. ISBN 978-1-57324-010-9.
- McIntosh, Jane (1999). The Practical Archaeologist: How We Know what We Know about the Past. Facts On File. ISBN 978-0-8160-3950-0.
- Nash, Stephen Edward, ed. (September 30, 2003). "Curators, collections, and contexts: anthropology at the Field Museum, 1893-2002". Fieldiana: Anthropology. 1525 (36). Field Museum of Natural History. JSTOR i29782661.
- Woolley, Leonard; Moorey, Peter Roger Stuart (1982). Ur 'of the Chaldees'. Herbert Press. ISBN 978-0-906969-21-2.
- Woolley, Leonard (1954). Excavations at Ur: A Record of Twelve Years' Work. Great Britain: Ernest Benn Limited. ISBN 978-0-8152-0110-6.
