= 532 BC =

532 BC in various calendars
- Gregorian calendar: 532 BC; DXXXII BC
- Ab urbe condita: 222
- Ancient Egypt era: XXVI dynasty, 133
- Pharaoh: Amasis II, 39
- Ancient Greek Olympiad (summer): 62nd Olympiad (victor)¹
- Assyrian calendar: 4219
- Balinese saka calendar: N/A
- Bengali calendar: −1125 – −1124
- Berber calendar: 419
- Buddhist calendar: 13
- Burmese calendar: −1169
- Byzantine calendar: 4977–4978
- Chinese calendar: 戊辰年 (Earth Dragon); 2166 or 1959 — to — 己巳年 (Earth Snake); 2167 or 1960
- Coptic calendar: −815 – −814
- Discordian calendar: 635
- Ethiopian calendar: −539 – −538
- Hebrew calendar: 3229–3230
- Hindu calendars
- Vikram Samvat: −475 – −474
- Shaka Samvat: N/A
- Kali Yuga: 2569–2570
- Holocene calendar: 9469
- Iranian calendar: 1153 BP – 1152 BP
- Islamic calendar: 1188 BH – 1187 BH
- Javanese calendar: N/A
- Julian calendar: N/A
- Korean calendar: 1802
- Minguo calendar: 2443 before ROC 民前2443年
- Nanakshahi calendar: −1999
- Thai solar calendar: 11–12
- Tibetan calendar: ས་ཕོ་འབྲུག་ལོ་ (male Earth-Dragon) −405 or −786 or −1558 — to — ས་མོ་སྦྲུལ་ལོ་ (female Earth-Snake) −404 or −785 or −1557

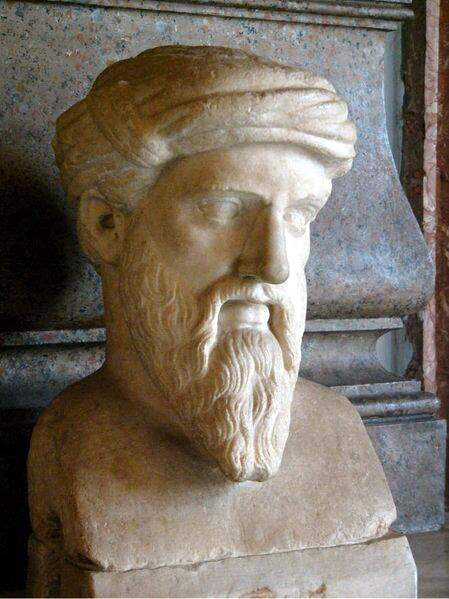
Bust of Pythagoras (c. 570–495 BC)

The year 532 BC was a year of the pre-Julian Roman calendar. In the Roman Empire, it was known as year 222 Ab urbe condita. The denomination 532 BC for this year has been used since the early medieval period, when the Anno Domini calendar era became the prevalent method in Europe for naming years.

== Events ==
=== By place ===
==== Europe ====
- Pythagoras arrives in the Greek colony of Croton (modern-day Crotone) in Magna Graecia and founds the philosophical school of Pythagoreanism (approximate date).

== Deaths ==
- Ping, ruler (duke) of the State of Jin (from 557 to 532 BC)
