= Ziggurat of Ur =

Early Bronze Age ziggurat in present-day Iraq

- Etemenniguru (Sumerian)
- Great Ziggurat of Ur
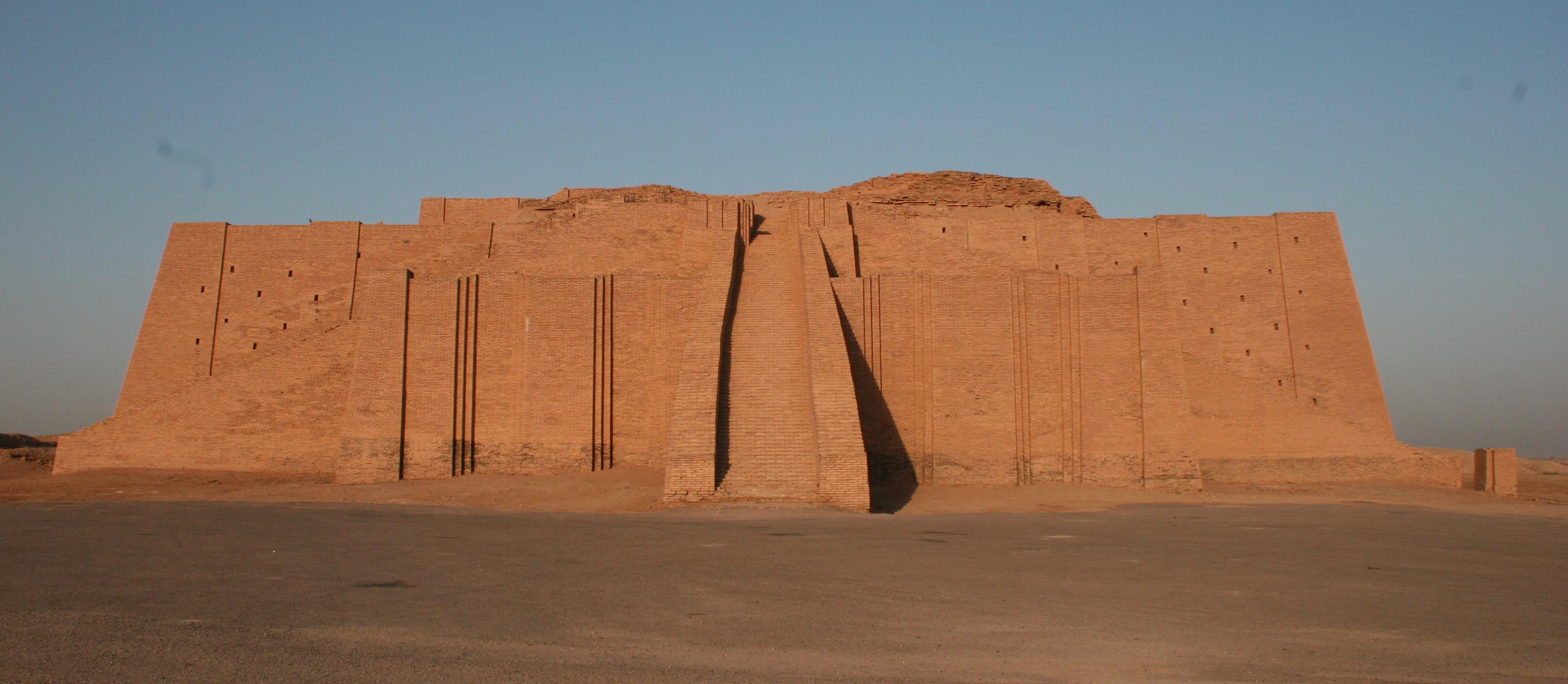
- Partially reconstructed façade and the access staircase of the ziggurat. The actual remains of the Neo-Babylonian structure can be seen at the top.

- Location within Iraq
- 30°57′46″N 46°6′11″E
- Type: Temple
- Location: Tell el-Muqayyar, Dhi Qar, Iraq

History
- Built: Construction started; c. 2040 BC; Completed; c. 2000 BC 4026 years ago; Reconstructed; c. 500s BC
- Built by: Ur-Nammu

Site notes
- Material: Mudbrick
- Height: c. 30 m (98 ft) (original)
- Length: 64 m (210 ft)
- Width: 45 m (148 ft)
- Area: 2,880 m^{2} (31,000 ft^{2})

The Ziggurat (or Great Ziggurat) of Ur (Sumerian: 𒂍𒋼𒅎𒅍 é-temen-ní-gùru "Etemenniguru", meaning "house whose foundation creates terror") is a Neo-Sumerian ziggurat in what was the city of Ur near Nasiriyah, in present-day Dhi Qar Province, Iraq. The structure was built during the Early Bronze Age (21st century BC) by King Ur-Nammu of the Third Dynasty of Ur. It had crumbled to ruins by the 6th century BC of the Neo-Babylonian period, when it was restored by King Nabonidus.

Its remains were excavated in the 1920s and 1930s by international teams led by Sir Leonard Woolley. Under Saddam Hussein in the 1980s, they were encased by a partial reconstruction of the façade and the monumental staircase. Today, Ur Tourist City is being developed adjacent to the site to serve Christian pilgrims and tourists, based on later religious traditions that identify a nearby complex as the home of the patriarch Abraham. The Ziggurat of Ur is the best-preserved of those known from Mesopotamia, besides the ziggurat of Dur Untash (Chogha Zanbil). It is one of three well-preserved structures of the Neo-Sumerian city of Ur, along with the Royal Mausolea and the Palace of Ur-Nammu (the E-hursag).

== Sumerian ziggurat ==
The ziggurat was built by King Ur-Nammu, who dedicated it in honour of Nanna/Sîn in approximately the 21st century BC (short chronology) during the Third Dynasty of Ur. The massive step pyramid measured 64 m (210 ft) in length, 45 m (148 ft) in width and over 30 m (98 ft) in height. The height is speculative, as only the foundations of the Sumerian ziggurat have survived.

The ziggurat was a piece in a temple complex that served as an administrative center for the city, and which was a shrine of the moon god Nanna, the patron deity of Ur.

The construction of the ziggurat was finished in the 21st century BC by King Shulgi, who, in order to win the allegiance of cities, proclaimed himself a god. During his 48-year reign, the city of Ur grew to be the capital of a state controlling much of Mesopotamia.

== Neo-Babylonian restoration ==
King Nabonidus, the last king of the Neo-Babylonian Empire in the 6th century BC, after "finding little left but the last stage and nothing to guide him as to the monument's original appearance", had it restored in seven stages rather than three.

== Excavation and preservation ==
The remains of the ziggurat were rediscovered by William Loftus in 1850. The first excavations at the site were conducted by John Taylor (mistakenly credited as "J. E. Taylor") in the 1850s, leading to the identification of the site as Ur. After World War I, preliminary excavations were performed by Reginald Thompson and Henry Hall. The site was extensively excavated in the 1920s by Sir Leonard Woolley by appointment of the University Museum of the University of Pennsylvania and the British Museum in the period of 1922 to 1934.

The remains of the ziggurat consist of a three-layered solid mass of mud brick faced with burnt bricks set in bitumen. The lowest layer corresponds to the original construction of Ur-Nammu, while the two upper layers are part of the Neo-Babylonian restorations. The façade of the lowest level and the monumental staircase were rebuilt under the orders of Saddam Hussein.

The rebuilt ziggurat was damaged in the Gulf War in 1991 by small arms fire, and the structure was shaken by explosions. Four bomb craters can be seen nearby, and the walls of the ziggurat are marred by over 400 bullet holes.

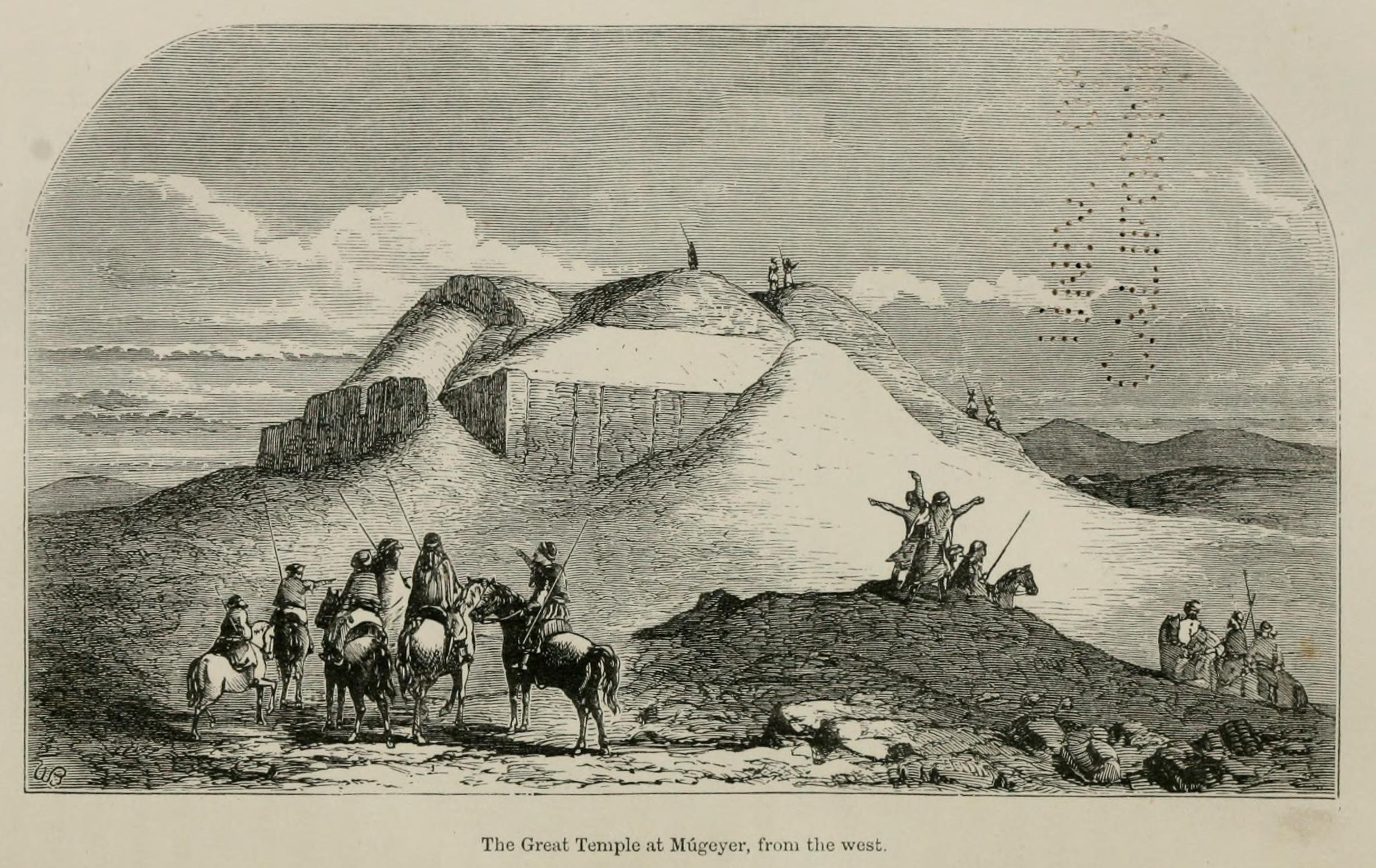
William Loftus's sketch of his discovery of the ziggurat

As of 2008, the site was under the supervision of curator Dief Mohssein Naiif al-Gizzy.

== Gallery ==
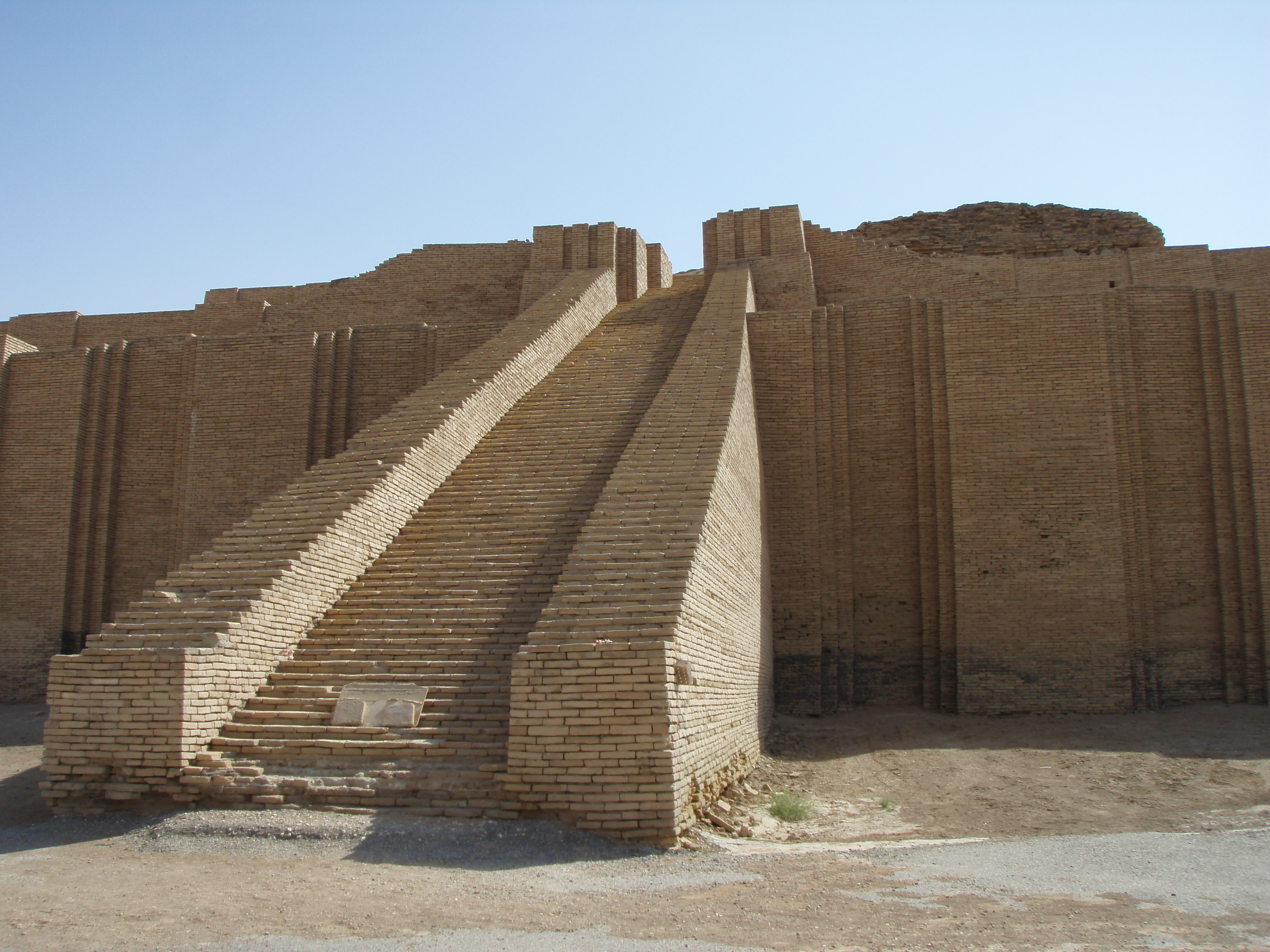

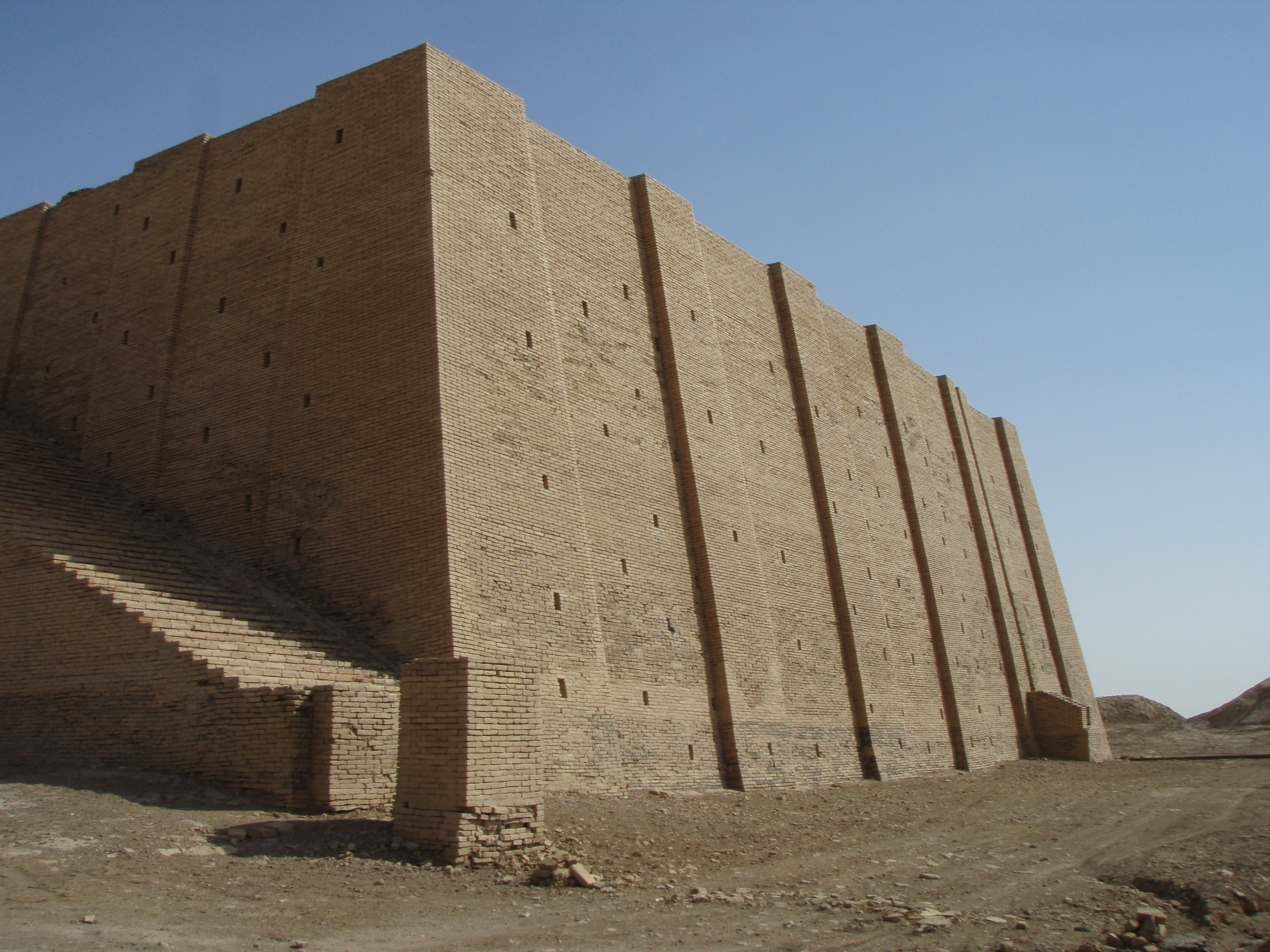

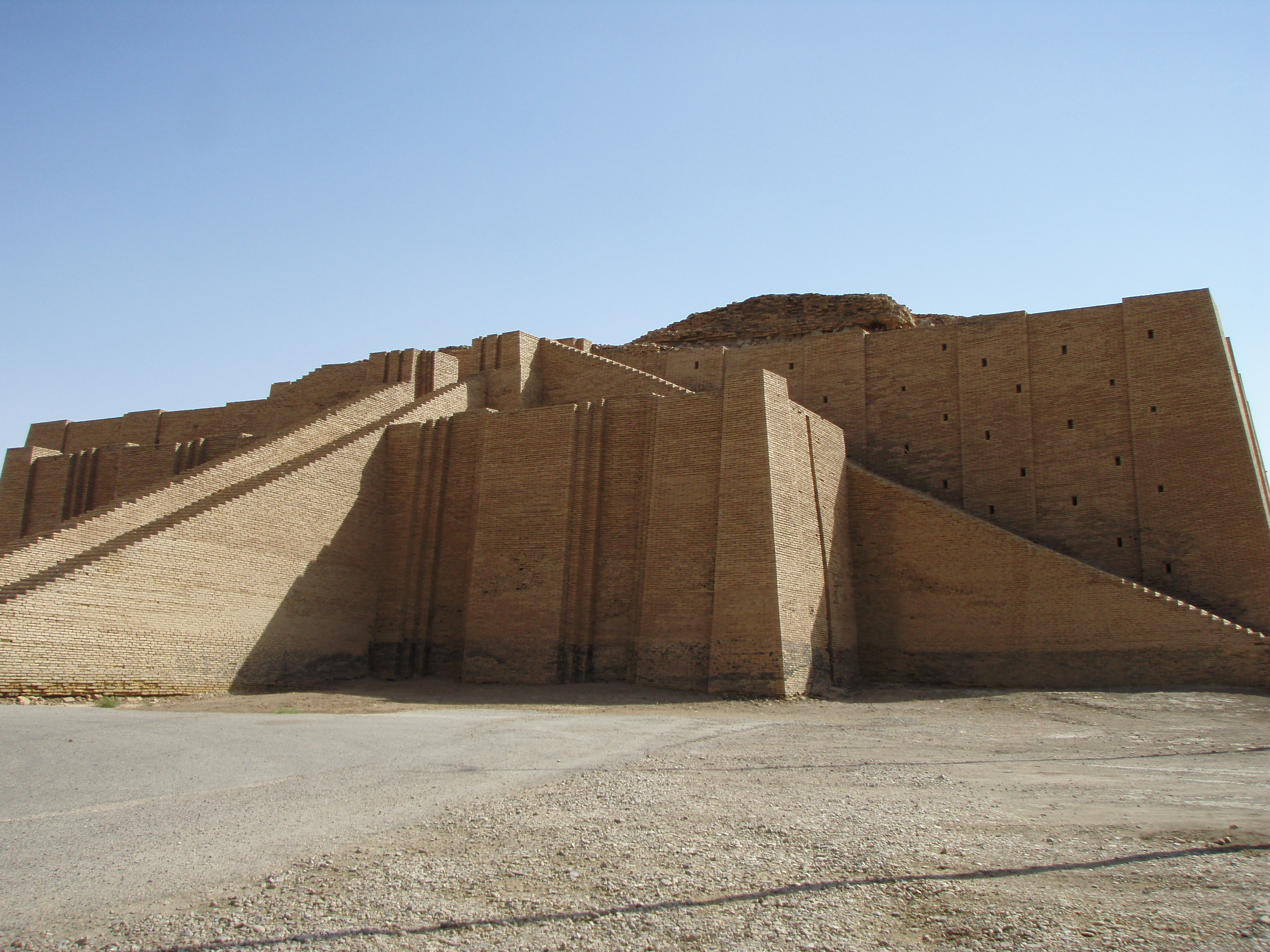

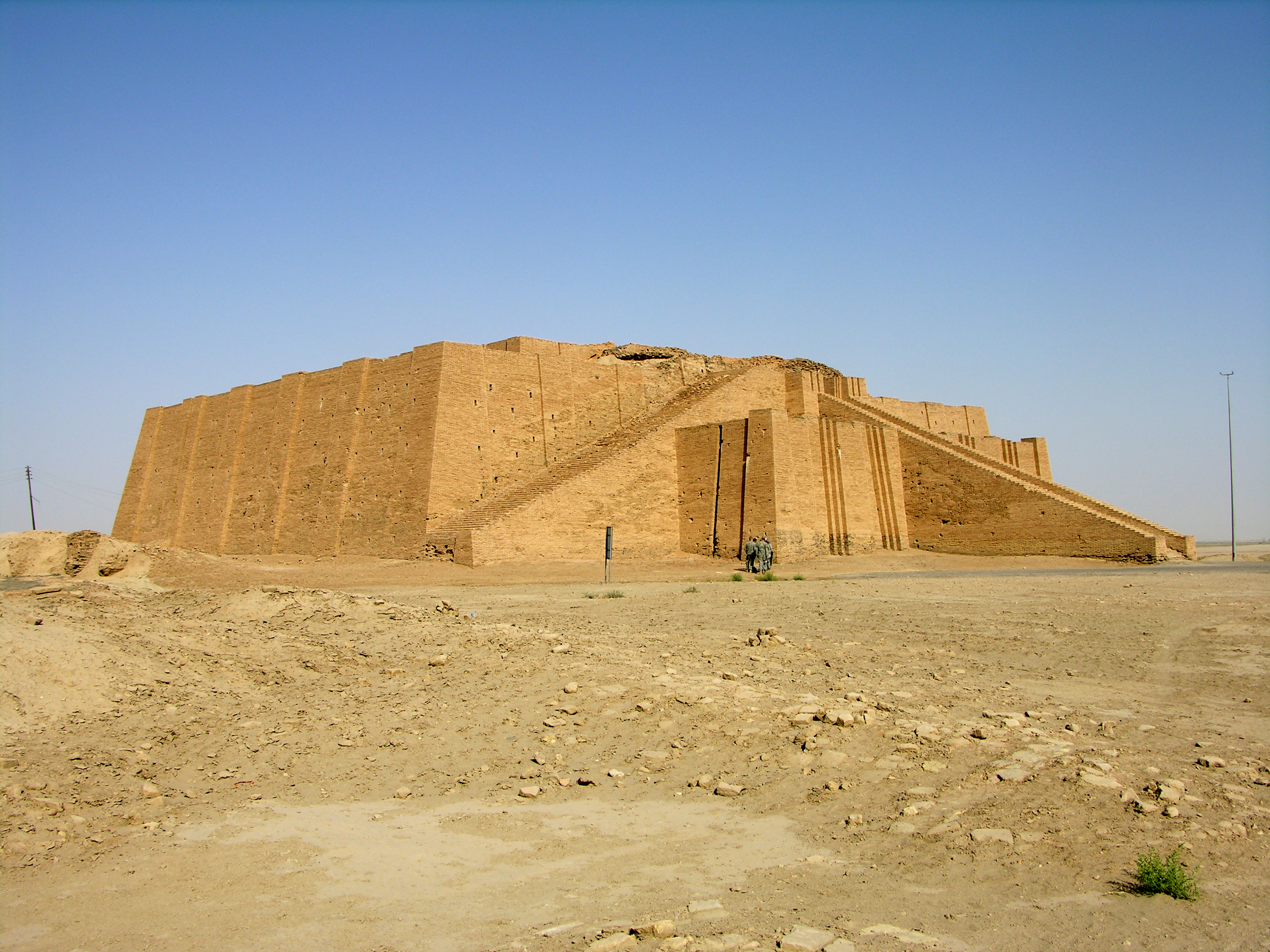

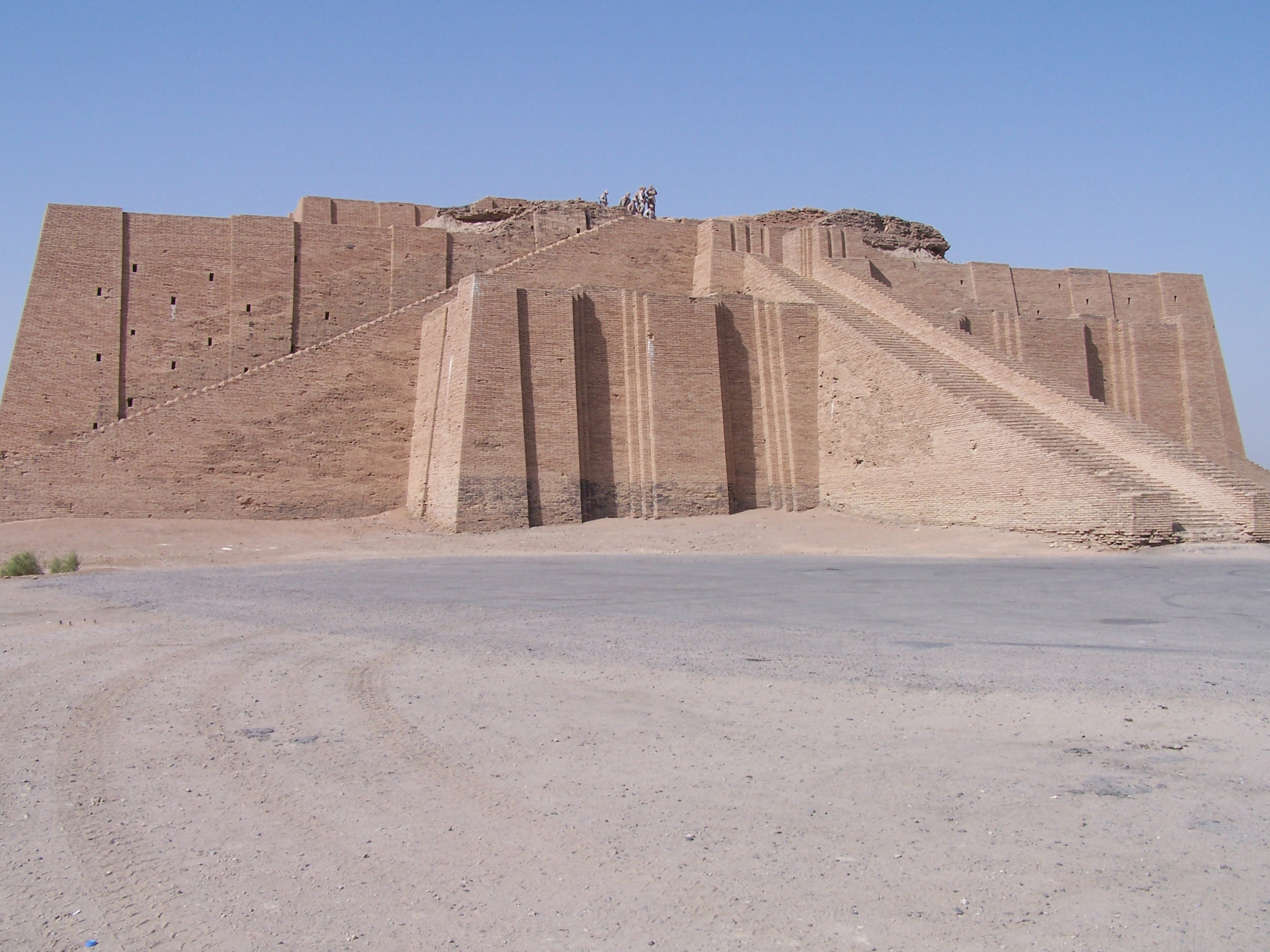

== See also ==
- Abraham
- Nasiriyah Airport
- Abraham and the temple in Islamic tradition
- Ennigaldi-Nanna's museum
- Architecture of Mesopotamia
- Ur of the Chaldees
- Ziggurat of Aqar Quf
