= Statue of Marduk =

Statue of the patron deity of the ancient city of Babylon

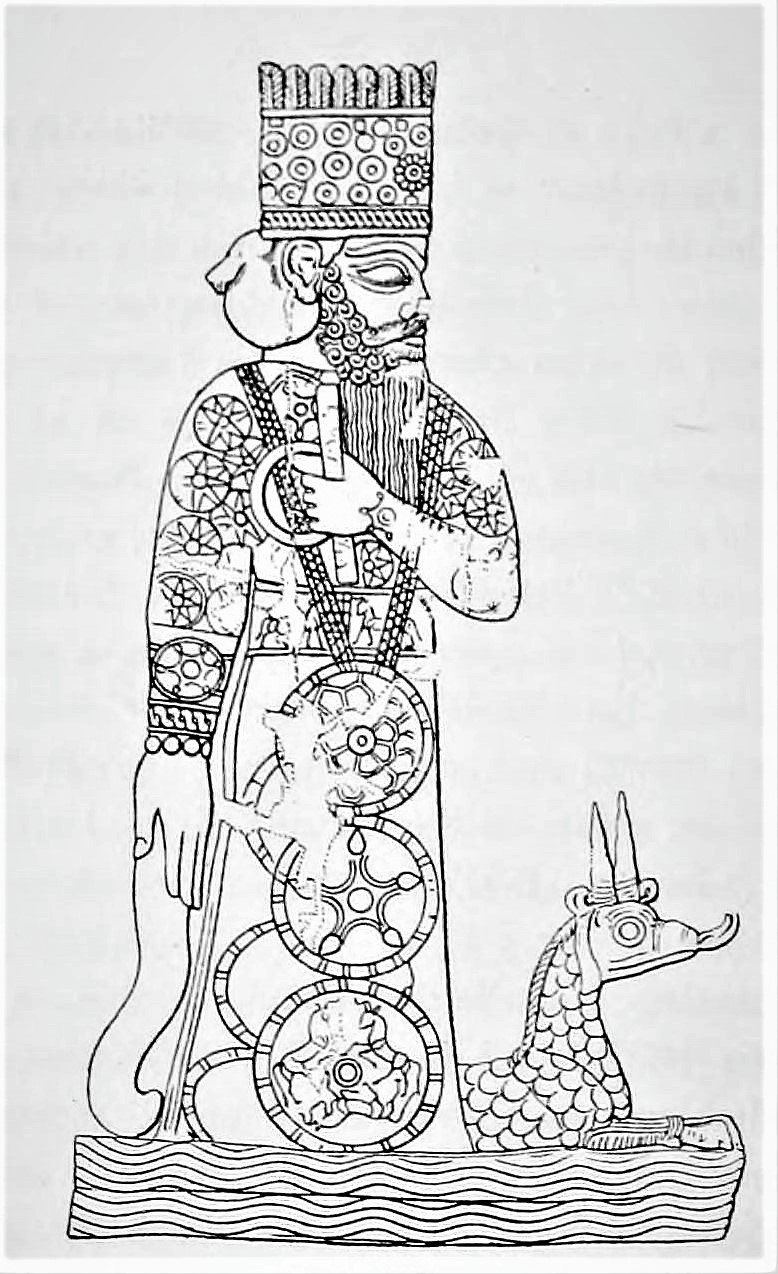
The Statue of Marduk depicted as being mounted on Marduk's dragon Mušḫuššu and standing victorious in the primordial water of Tiamat. From a cylinder seal of the 9th century BC Babylonian king Marduk-zakir-shumi I.

The Statue of Marduk, also known as the Statue of Bêl (Bêl, meaning "lord", being a common designation for Marduk), was the physical representation of the god Marduk, the patron deity of the ancient city of Babylon, traditionally housed in the city's main temple, the Esagila. There were seven statues of Marduk in Babylon, but 'the' Statue of Marduk generally refers to the god's main statue, placed prominently in the Esagila and used in the city's rituals. This statue was nicknamed the Asullḫi and was made of a type of wood called mēsu and covered with gold and silver.

Similar to statues of deities in other cities in Mesopotamia, the Babylonians conflated this statue with their actual god, believing that Marduk himself resided in their city through the statue. As such, the statue held enormous religious significance. It was used during the Babylonian New Year's festival and the kings of Babylon incorporated it into their coronation rituals, receiving the crown "from the hands" of Marduk.

Because of the enormous significance of the statue, it was sometimes used as a means of psychological warfare by Babylon's enemies. Enemy powers such as the Hittites, the Assyrians and the Elamites stole the statue during sacks of the city, which caused religious and political turmoil, as Babylon's traditional rituals could then not be completed. All the foreign kings known to have stolen the statue ended up later being killed by their own family members, something the Babylonians hailed as divine punishment. Returns of the statue, either through the enemies giving it back or through a Babylonian king campaigning and successfully retrieving it, were occasions for great celebrations.

The ultimate fate of the statue is uncertain. A common assumption is that it was destroyed by the Achaemenid Persian king Xerxes I after a Babylonian uprising against his rule in 484 BC, but historical sources used for this assumption could be referring to a completely different statue. The statue's crown was restored by Alexander the Great in 325 BC, meaning it was still in the Esagila at that time. There are a handful of references to later rulers giving gifts "to Marduk" in the Esagila, some from as late as during the time of Parthian rule in Mesopotamia in the 2nd century BC.

== Background ==
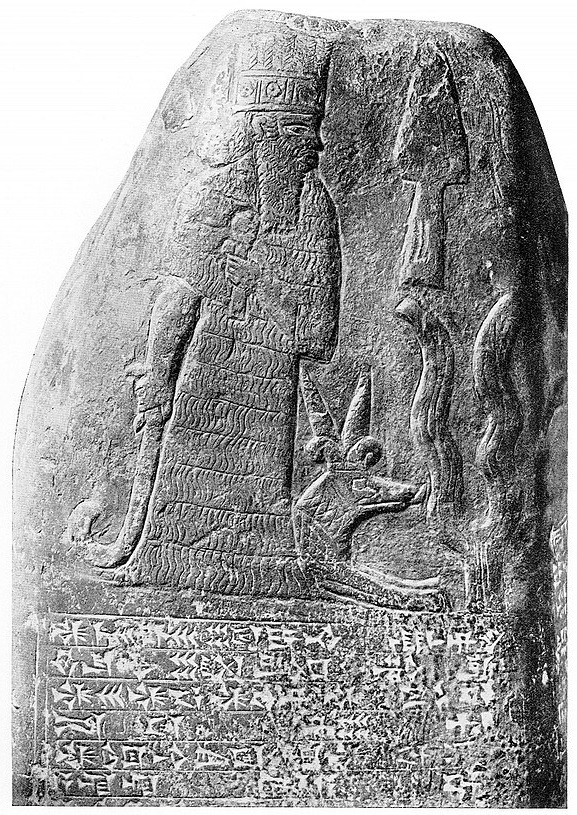
The Statue of Marduk on a kudurru stele of the Babylonian king Meli-Shipak (12th century BC)

Marduk was the patron deity of the city of Babylon, having held this position since the reign of Hammurabi (18th century BC) in Babylon's first dynasty. Although Babylonian worship of Marduk never meant the denial of the existence of the other gods in the Mesopotamian pantheon, it has sometimes been compared to monotheism. The history of worship of Marduk is intimately tied to the history of Babylon itself and as Babylon's power increased, so did the position of Marduk relative to that of other Mesopotamian gods. By the end of the second millennium BC, Marduk was sometimes just referred to as Bêl, meaning "lord".

In Mesopotamian mythology, Marduk was a creator god. Going by the Enûma Eliš, the Babylonian creation myth, Marduk was the son of Enki, the Mesopotamian god of wisdom, and rose to prominence during a great battle between the gods. The myth tells how the universe originated as a chaotic realm of water in which there originally were two primordial deities, Tiamat (salt water, female) and Abzu (sweet water, male). These two gods gave birth to other deities. These deities (including gods such as Enki) had little to do in these early stages of existence and as such occupied themselves with various activities.

Eventually, their children began to annoy the elder gods and Abzu decided to rid himself of them by killing them. Alarmed by this, Tiamat revealed Abzu's plan to Enki, who killed his father before the plot could be enacted. Although Tiamat had revealed the plot to Enki to warn him, the death of Abzu horrified her and she too attempted to kill her children, raising an army together with her new consort Kingu. Every battle in the war was a victory for Tiamat, until Marduk convinced the other gods to proclaim him as their leader and king. The gods agreed, and Marduk was victorious, capturing and executing Kingu and firing a great arrow at Tiamat, killing her and splitting her in two.

With these chaotic primordial forces defeated, Marduk created the world and ordered the heavens. Marduk is also described as the creator of human beings, which were meant to help the gods in defeating and holding off the forces of chaos and thus maintain order on Earth.

== Appearance and other statues ==
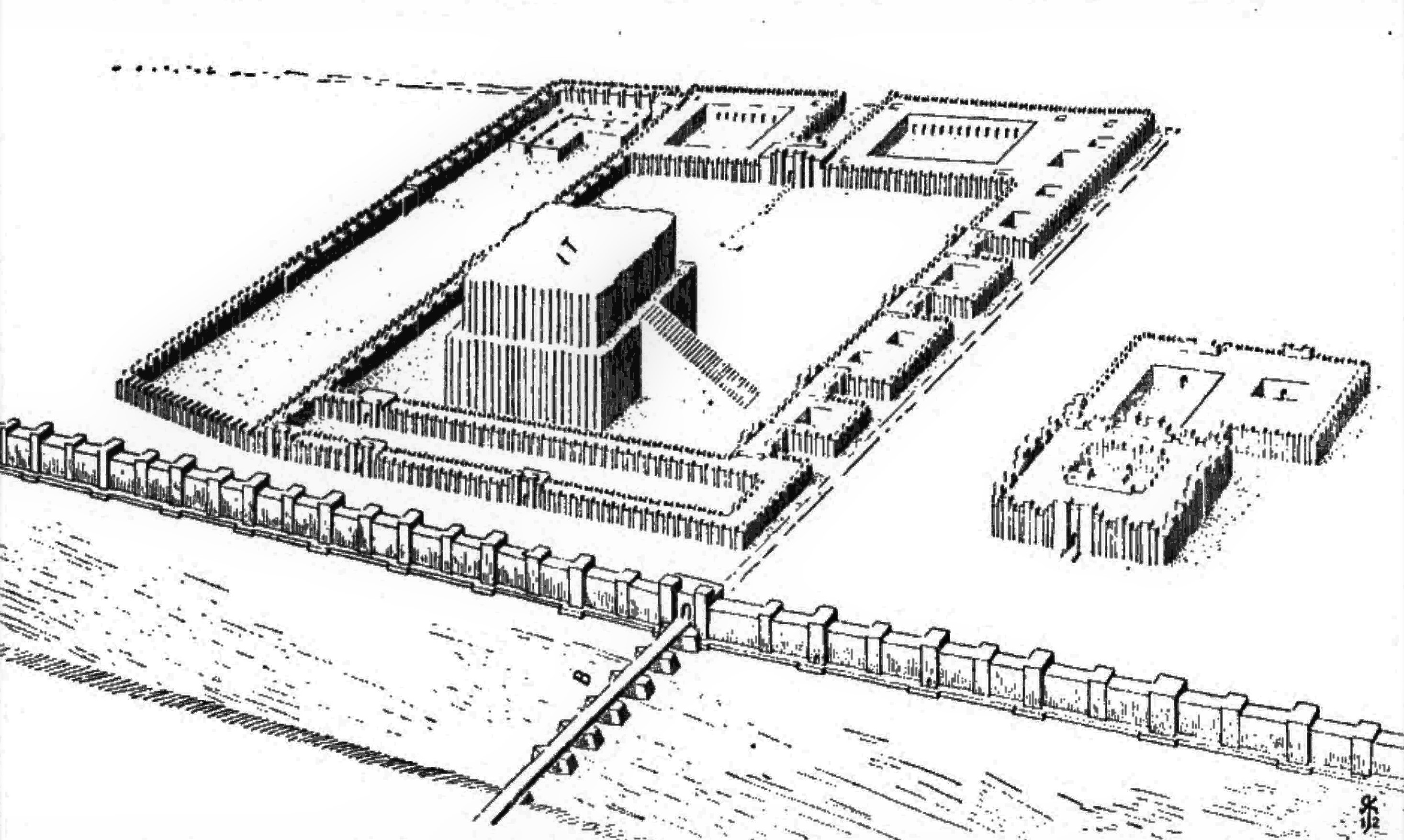
Reconstruction of the peribolos at Babylon, including the temple of Esagila, where Marduk's statue was kept. From The Excavations at Babylon (1914)

The Statue of Marduk was the physical representation of Marduk housed in Babylon's main temple, the Esagila. Although there were actually seven separate statues of Marduk in Babylon: four in the Esagila and the surrounding temple complex; one in the Etemenanki (the ziggurat dedicated to Marduk); and two in temples dedicated to other deities. 'The' statue of Marduk usually refers to Marduk's primary statue, placed prominently in the Esagila and used in the city's rituals.

This principal statue of Marduk was nicknamed the Asullḫi and made of a type of wood called mēsu. The carved wooden statue would also have been covered in precious metals, such as gold and silver. In addition to this, the statue would have been provided with ritual clothing, at least partly made of gold. This statue would have occupied the cult room of Marduk in the Esagila, called the E-umuša. Among the various statues of Marduk, the one called the Asullḫi is the only one explicitly mentioned in connection with the city's major rituals (though the statue is rarely named, often being referred to just as "Marduk" or "Bêl"). The name Asullḫi had centuries prior been associated with a separate deity of incantations later conflated with Marduk.

Another statue of Marduk, called the Asarre, was made from a stone the Babylonians called marḫušu, possibly chlorite or steatite. The Asarre was located in a chapel dedicated to the god Ninurta off the north side of the Esagila's central courtyard. Though this chapel would have been dedicated to Ninurta, the Marduk statue would have occupied the central point of attention and thus have been the main figure. This might be explained through the god Ninurta becoming seen as simply an aspect of Marduk—an ancient visitor to the temple may not have been surprised to find Marduk in the stead of Ninurta. Other statues included one made of a type of wood called taskarinnu and placed in a chamber dedicated to the Enki (Marduk's father) in the E-kar-zaginna temple, part of the Esagila temple complex but not of the temple itself; an alabaster statue in the "temple of E-namtila"; a statue of hematite in the "chapel of Ninurta in the temple E-ḫursag-tilla"; and a statue of unknown material in "E-gišḫur-ankia, the temple of Bēlet-Ninua".

== Role and importance ==
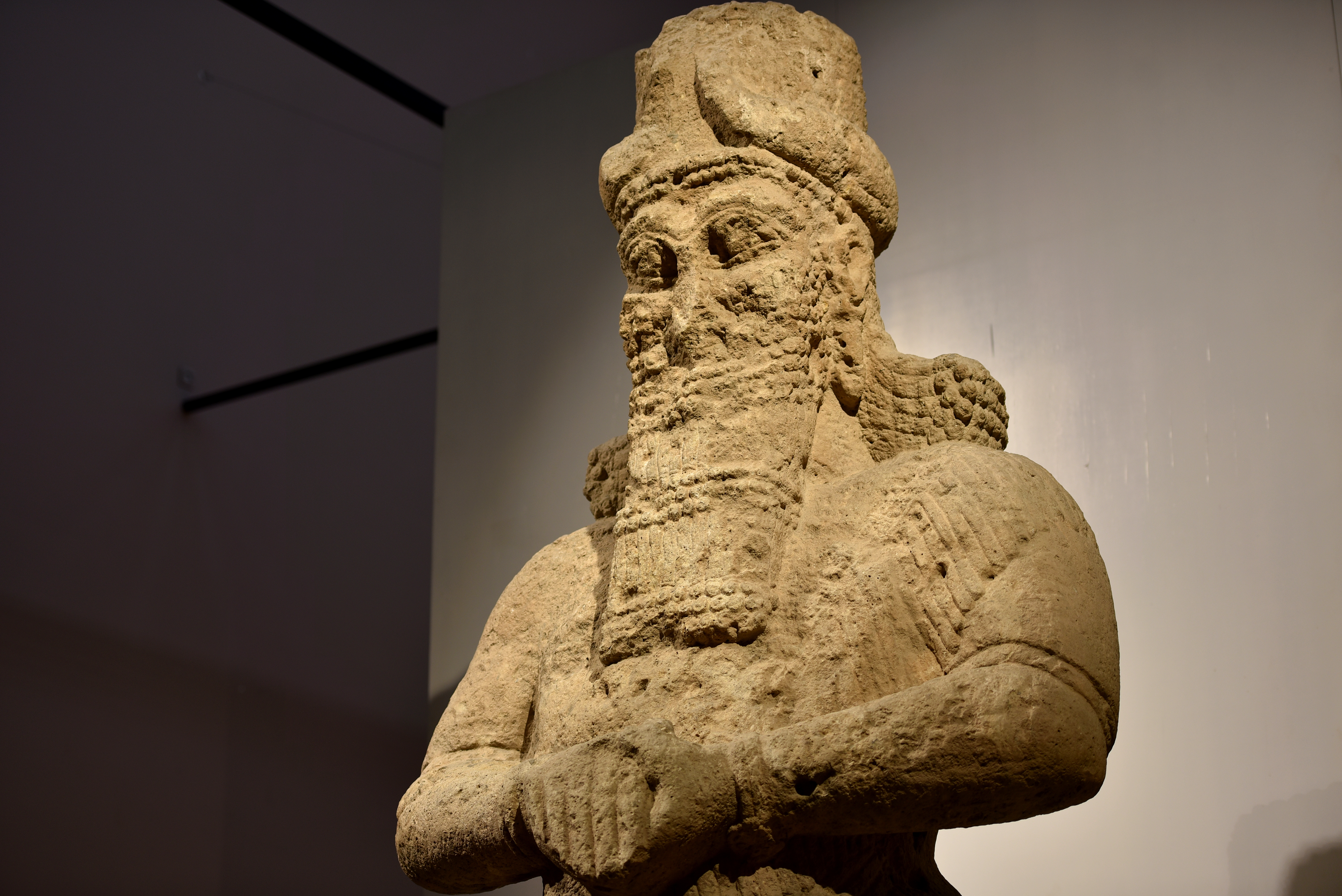
Closeup of a colossal stone statue of the god Nabu (the son of Marduk) recovered from the city Kalhu, an example of a surviving ancient Mesopotamian statue of a deity. Exhibited at the Iraq Museum.

The citizens of the city of Babylon conflated the Asullḫi with the actual god Marduk—the god was understood as living in the temple, among the people of his city, and not in the heavens. As such, Marduk was not seen as some distant entity, but a friend and protector who lived nearby. This was no different from other Mesopotamian cities, who similarly conflated their gods with the representations used for them in their temples. During the religiously important 13-day long New Year's festival held annually in the spring at Babylon, the statue was removed from the temple and paraded through the city before being placed in a smaller building outside the city walls, where the statue received fresh air and could enjoy a different view from the one it had from inside the temple. The statue was traditionally incorporated into the coronation rituals for the Babylonian kings, who received their crowns "out of the hands" of Marduk during the New Year's festival, symbolizing them being bestowed with kingship by the patron deity of the city.

Both his rule and role as Marduk's vassal on Earth were reaffirmed annually at this time of year, when the king entered the Esagila alone on the fifth day of the festivities and met with the chief priest. The chief priest removed the regalia from the king, slapped him across the face and made him kneel before Marduk's statue. The king would then tell the statue that he had not oppressed his people and that he had maintained order throughout the year, whereafter the chief priest would reply (on behalf of Marduk) that the king could continue to enjoy divine support for his rule and the regalia were returned. The standard full Negative Confession of the king was the following:

[I have not] sinned, lord of the lands, I have not neglected your divinity,
[I have not] ruined Babylon, I have not ordered its dissolution,
[I have not] made the Esagila tremble, I have not forgotten its rites,
[I have not] struck the cheek of any privileged subject, I have [not] brought about their humiliation,
[I have been taking ca]re of Babylon, I have not destroyed its outer walls!

Because of its significance to the city, Babylon's enemies often used the statue as a means of psychological warfare. When foreign powers conquered or plundered Babylon, the statue was often stolen from the city (a common way of weakening the power of defeated cities in ancient Mesopotamia). Such events caused great distress for the Babylonians, as the removal of the statue signified the actual departure of the real deity, their friend and protector. Without it, the New Year's festival could not be celebrated and religious activities were difficult to perform. The Babylonians believed that the statue's departures from the city were somewhat self-imposed, with the statue itself deciding to make the journey and foreign theft of it simply being a means to achieve that. The statue's absence meant confusion and hardship for the Babylonians, who believed that foreign lands benefited from having the statue as it brought prosperity wherever it went. The practice of taking the cult statues from enemies was viewed as capturing the enemy's source of divine power and suppressing that power.

Statues of deities were sometimes destroyed by enemy powers, as was once the case for the statue of the sun god Shamash in that deity's patron city, Sippar. It was destroyed by the Suteans during the reign of Babylonian king Simbar-shipak (c. 1026–1009 BC). As these statues held enormous religious significance, the statue of Shamash could not be replaced until almost two centuries later, under King Nabu-apla-iddina (c. 887–855 BC) when a replica of the original was "divinely revealed" and the king ordered the new statue to be ritually dedicated. In the meantime, Sippar had prayed to its god using a sun-disc as a substitute for the statue. Though they were conflated into one, gods in Mesopotamia were believed to be able to "abandon" their statues. In an 8th-century BC religious text, the poor state of Marduk's statue inspired the god Erra to suggest that Marduk depart from the statue and that Erra could rule in his stead until the Babylonians had finished restoring it.

Gods could exist in heaven and on Earth simultaneously, and their presence on Earth could be in multiple places at the same time: for instance, Shamash and the goddess Ishtar (a goddess of sex, war, justice and political power associated with the planet Venus) were manifested in cult images in many different cities and were also still seen as being present in their respective heavenly bodies. Though statues and other cult images could be harmed, this did not mean that actual damage was being done to the gods themselves.

== History ==
=== Journeys of Marduk ===
Journeys of Marduk
c.1595 BC	The Hittite king Mursili I sacks Babylon, the statue is carried to Hattusa.
c.1344 BC	The Hittite king Šuppiluliuma I possibly returns the statue as a gesture of goodwill.
1225 BC	Babylon is sacked by Assyrian king Tukulti-Ninurta I, the statue is carried to Assur.
?	The statue returns to Babylon and is later moved to Sippar.
c.1150 BC	Sippar is sacked by Elamite king Shutruk-Nakhunte, the statue is carried to Elam.
1125–1104 BC	Nebuchadnezzar I rules as King of Babylon, he defeats the Elamites and returns the statue to the city.
689 BC	Assyrian king Sennacherib sacks Babylon, the statue is carried to Issete in Assyria.
668 BC	The statue is returned to the city with Shamash-shum-ukin's coronation as King of Babylon.
484 BC	Babylon revolts against Achaemenid king Xerxes I and is harshly reprimanded. Some scholars believe the statue was destroyed or removed at this time.
325 BC	Alexander the Great is mentioned as restoring the statue's crown.
127 BC	Hyspaosines is mentioned as giving gifts "to Marduk" in the Esagila in Babylon

The statue was first stolen from the city when King Mursili I of the Hittites sacked Babylon c. 1595 BC. Mursili's war against Babylon ended the city's first dynasty and left its empire in ruins. Although Babylon rebuilt its kingdom under the Kassite dynasty, the statue spent centuries in the kingdom of the Hittites, possibly being returned c. 1344 BC by King Šuppiluliuma I as a gesture of goodwill.

The statue then remained in Babylon until the Assyrian king Tukulti-Ninurta I captured Babylon in 1225 BC, when he plundered the city and carried the statue away to the Assyrian capital, Assur. What exactly happened thereafter is unclear, but it was returned and then later, for unknown reasons, moved to the nearby city Sippar. Sippar was sacked c. 1150 BC by the Elamites under their king, Shutruk-Nakhunte, who stole the statue, carrying it to his homeland Elam. The statue was successfully seized and returned to Babylon after the Babylonian king Nebuchadnezzar I (r. c. 1125–1104 BC) campaigned against the Elamites. Nebuchadnezzar's successful return of the statue to the city was a monumentous event and several literary works were created to commemorate it, possibly including an early version of the Enûma Eliš.

The Neo-Assyrian King Tiglath-Pileser III conquered Babylon in October 729 BC, after which the Neo-Assyrian monarchs proclaimed themselves as kings of Babylon in addition to already being kings of Assyria. As vengeance after a series of revolts, the Neo-Assyrian king Sennacherib plundered and destroyed Babylon in 689 BC. Sennacherib had been seen as heretical by the Babylonians, as he had not gone through with the traditional coronation ritual (with the statue) when he had proclaimed himself as Babylon's king. Following the destruction of the city, Sennacherib stole the statue and it was kept at the town of Issete in the northeastern parts of Assyria. When Sennacherib was murdered by his sons Arda-Mulissu and Sharezer in 681 BC, the Babylonians saw it as Marduk's divine retribution. Sennacherib's successor as Assyrian king, Esarhaddon, rebuilt Babylon in the 670s BC, restoring the Esagila. Under Esarhaddon's guidance, a pedestal in gold (intended to support the returned statue) was created in the Esagila. The statue was finally returned to the city during the coronation of Esarhaddon's successor as Babylonian king, Shamash-shum-ukin, in the spring of 668 BC. It is possible that Sennacherib actually destroyed the original statue and the statue returned to Babylon in 668 BC was a replica; some of Sennacherib's inscriptions allude to smashing the statues of the gods in Babylon while others explicitly state that the Marduk statue was carried to Assyria.

Assyrian control of Babylon was ended with the successful revolt of Nabopolassar in 626 BC, which established the Neo-Babylonian Empire. Nabopolassar's son and heir, Nebuchadnezzar II (r. 605–562 BC) widened the streets of Babylon so that the parade of the statue through the city at the New Year's festival would be made easier. The Neo-Babylonian Empire was ended with the conquest of Babylon by Cyrus the Great of the Achaemenid Empire in 539 BC. Cyrus showed respect for the city and the statue and his own inscriptions surrounding his conquest of the city explicitly state that Marduk was on his side in the war.

Though the statue was often used as a means of psychological warfare by removing it from the city, powerful foreign rulers who did so had a tendency to die at the hands of their own family members. Mursili I, Shutruk-Nakhunte, Tukulti-Ninurta I, Sennacherib and the later Xerxes I were all killed by members of their own families. Such deaths, as can be seen in the Babylonian reaction to Sennacherib's murder in particular, were hailed by the Babylonians as divine punishment.

=== Xerxes and Babylon ===
In 484 BC, during the reign of the Achaemenid king Xerxes I, Babylon produced two contemporary revolts against Achaemenid rule, the revolts being led by rebel leaders Bel-shimanni and Shamash-eriba. Prior to these revolts, Babylon had occupied a special position within the Achaemenid Empire, the Achaemenid kings had been titled as king of Babylon and king of the Lands, perceiving Babylonia as a somewhat separate entity within their empire, united with their own kingdom in a personal union. Xerxes gradually dropped the previous royal title and divided the previously large Babylonian satrapy (accounting for most of the Neo-Babylonian Empire's territory) into smaller sub-units.

Using texts written by classical authors, it is often assumed that Xerxes enacted a brutal vengeance on Babylon following the two revolts. According to ancient writers, Xerxes destroyed Babylon's fortifications and damaged the temples in the city. The Esagila was allegedly exposed to great damage and Xerxes allegedly carried the statue of Marduk away from the city, possibly bringing it to Iran and melting it down (classical authors held that the statue was entirely made of gold, which would have made melting it down possible). Historian Amélie Kuhrt considers it unlikely that Xerxes destroyed the temples, but believes that the story of him doing so may derive from an anti-Persian sentiment among the Babylonians. The story of Xerxes melting the statue comes chiefly from the ancient Greek writer Herodotus, who isn't otherwise considered entirely reliable and has been noted as being very anti-Persian. Joshua J. Mark, writing in the Ancient History Encyclopedia, believes that the account of Herodotus, a Persian king destroying the statue of the deity of a city he just razed, could be anti-Persian propaganda. Furthermore, it is doubtful if the statue was removed from Babylon at all. In From Cyrus to Alexander: A History of the Persian Empire (2002), Pierre Briant considered it possible that Xerxes did remove a statue from the city, but that this was the golden statue of a man rather than the statue of the god Marduk. Though mentions of the statue are lacking compared to earlier periods, contemporary documents suggest that the Babylonian New Year's Festival continued in some form during the Persian period. Because the change in rulership from the Babylonians themselves to the Persians and due to the replacement of the city's elite families by Xerxes following its revolt, it is possible that the festival's traditional rituals and events had changed considerably. Although contemporary evidence for Xerxes's retribution against Babylon is missing, later authors mention the damage he inflicted upon the city's temples. For instance, both the Roman historian Arrian and the Greek historian Diodorus Siculus describe how Alexander the Great restored some temples in the city which had been destroyed or damaged by Xerxes.

=== Later mentions ===
Arrian and Diodorus Siculus do not mention the Statue of Marduk, sometimes interpreted as indicating that the statue was no longer in the Esagila by Alexander's time. However, the statue was demonstrably still present in the Esagila, since its crown is mentioned as having been restored by Alexander in 325 BC. The crown is described as being horned, horned crowns being an ancient Mesopotamian way to indicate divinity, conflicting with how the statue's crown is portrayed in ancient Babylonian depictions.

Due to his efforts to respect local religious customs in Mesopotamia, American historian Oliver D. Hoover speculated in 2011 that Seleucus I Nicator (r. 305–281 BC), the first king of the Seleucid Empire, might have undergone a traditional Babylonian coronation ceremony during a New Year's Festival in Babylon, involving the statue. Several later rulers are referenced as giving gifts "to Marduk" in the Esagila. Seleucus I's son and successor, Antiochus I Soter, sacrificed to Marduk several times during his time as crown prince. A late reference comes from the period of Parthian rule in Mesopotamia, with the Characenean ruler Hyspaosines attested as giving gifts "to Marduk" in 127 BC.

There are no known sources that mention the New Year's Festival as a contemporary event from the time of the Seleucids and onwards and one of the last times the tradition is known to have been celebrated is 188 BC. During the festival of 188 BC, Antiochus III, great-grandson of Antiochus I, prominently partook and was given various valuables, including a golden crown and the royal robe of Nebuchadnezzar II, by Babylon's high priest at the Esagila. The statue was a known historical object as late as the time of Parthian rule beyond Hyspaosines's time, from which a ritual text describes its role in the New Year's festival, including how the Enûma Eliš was recited in front of it and how the ancient kings of Babylon were supposed to be ritually slapped during the festival.
