= Esagila =

Temple in Babylon, modern Iraq

Coordinates: 32°32′2″N 44°25′17″E

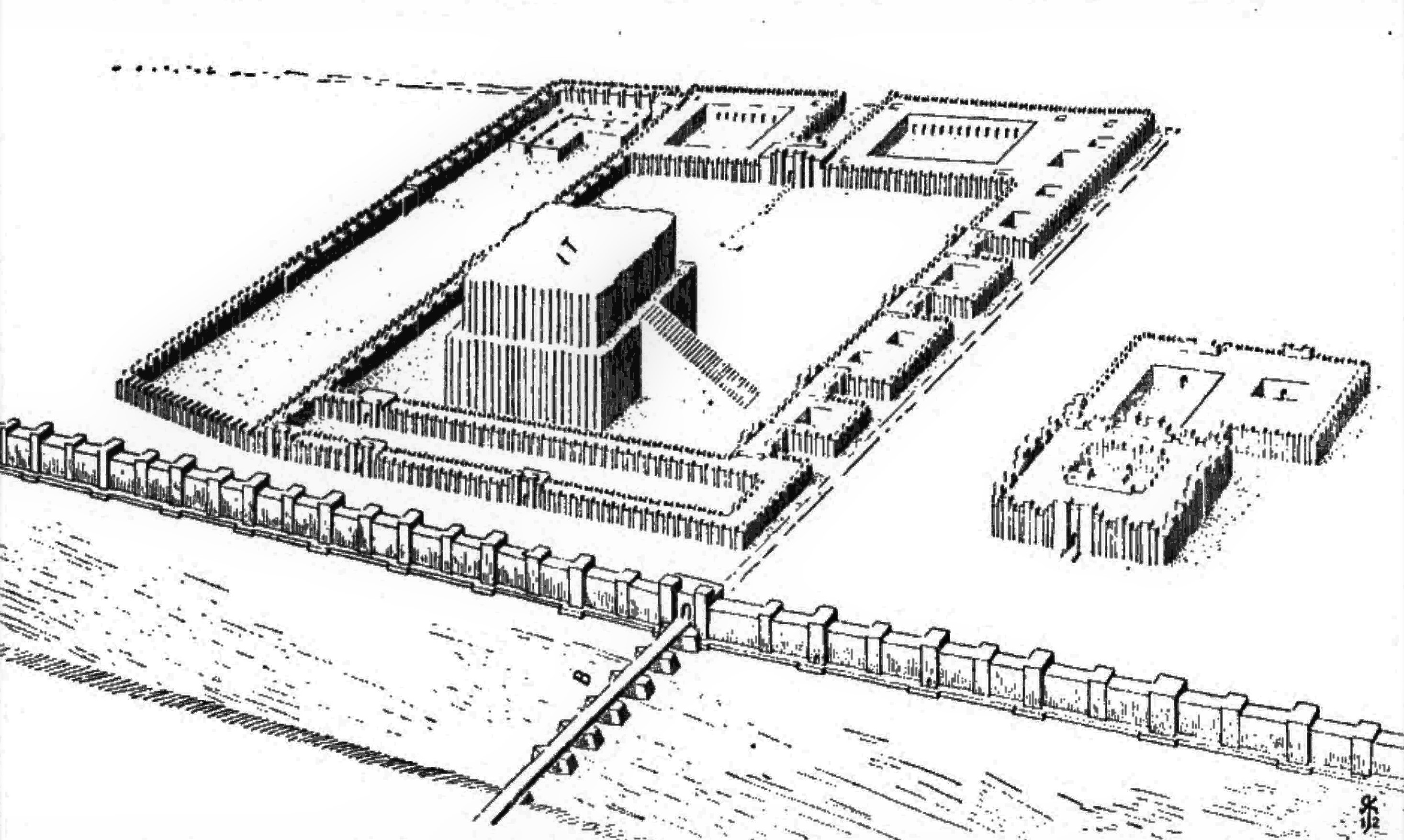
Reconstruction of the peribolos at Babylon, including the temple of Esagila, from The excavations at Babylon (1914)

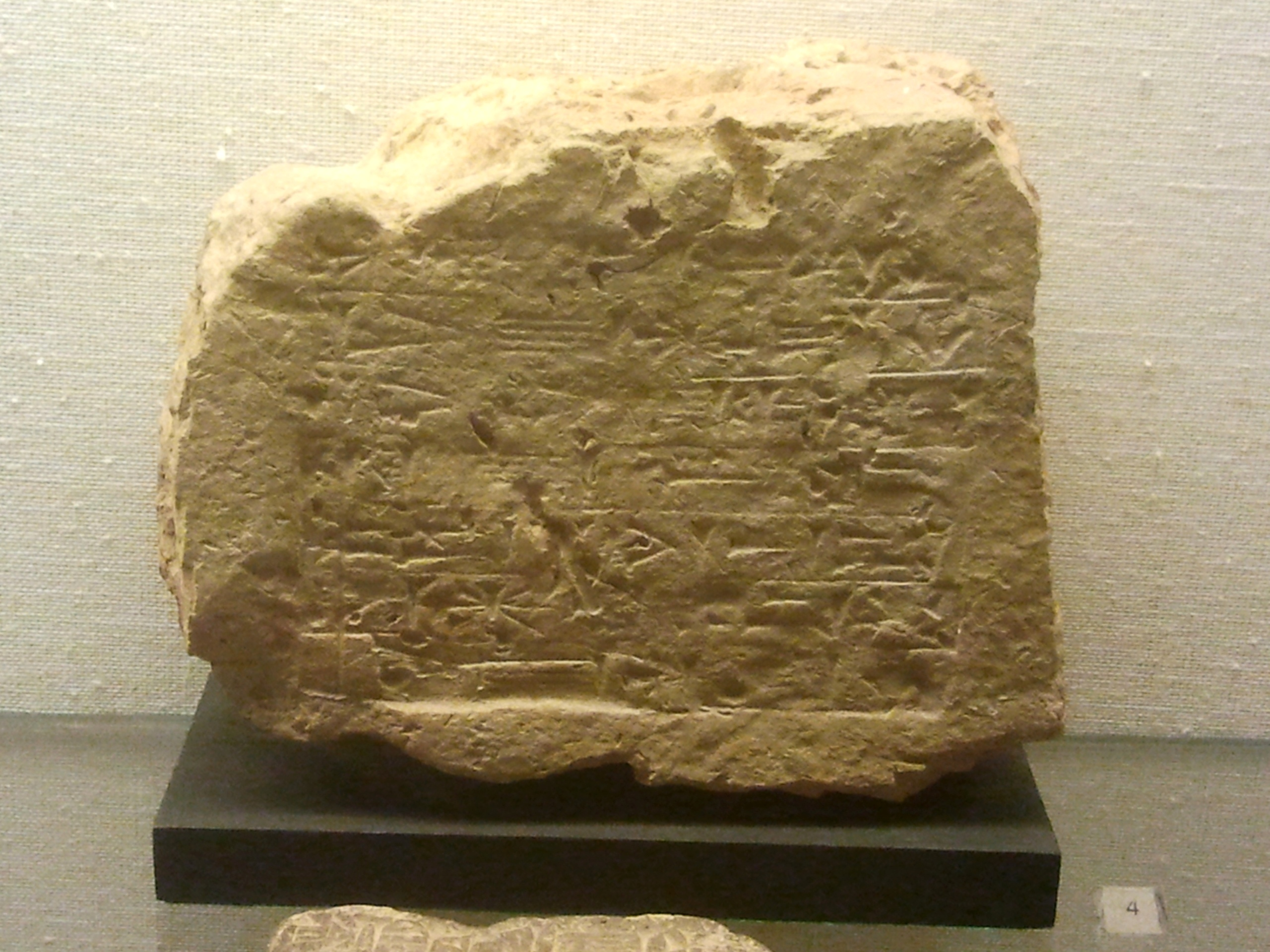
Babylonian clay brick from sixth century BC cuneiform inscription "Nebuchadnezzar support Esagila temple and temple Ezida (Borsippa). Eldest son of Nabopolassar, king of Babylon. Hecht Museum Haifa

The Ésagila or Esangil (Sumerian: 𒂍𒊕𒅍𒆷 É-SAǦ-ÍL.LA, "temple whose top is lofty") was a temple dedicated to Marduk, the protector god of Babylon. It lay south of the ziggurat Etemenanki.

== Description ==
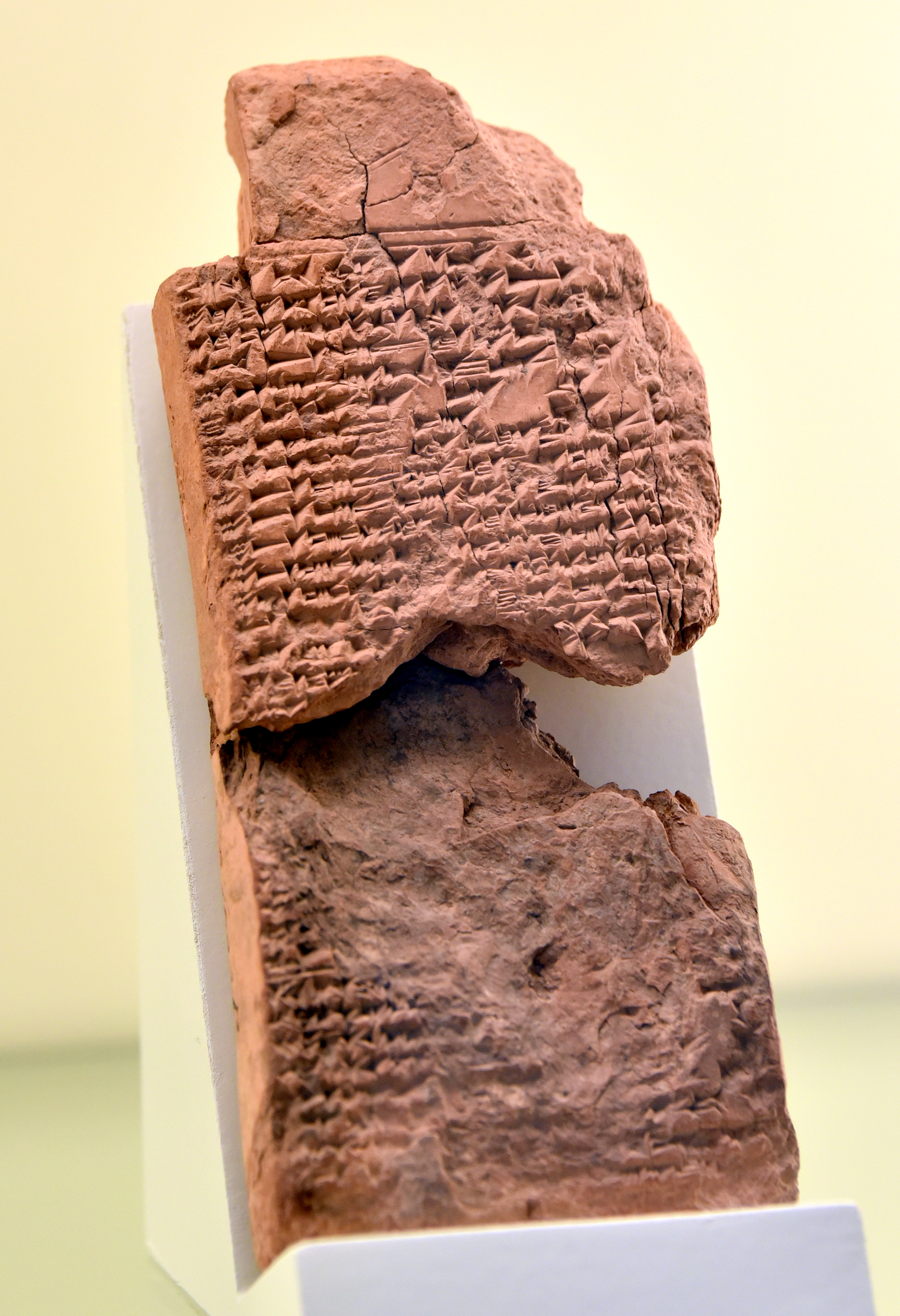
Clay tablet mentioning the dimensions of the Temples of Esagila and Ezida at Babylon. From Babylon, Iraq. 8th-7th century BCE. Vorderasiatisches Museum, Berlin

In this temple was the statue of Marduk, surrounded by cult images of the cities that had fallen under the hegemony of the Babylonian Empire from the 18th century BC; there was also a little lake which was named Abzu by the Babylonian priests. This Abzu was a representation of Marduk's father, Enki, who was god of the waters and lived in the Abzu that was the source of all the fresh waters.

Esarhaddon, king of the Neo-Assyrian Empire (681 – 669 BC), reconstructed the temple. He claimed that he built the temple from the foundation to the battlements, a claim corroborated by dedicatory inscriptions found on the stones of the temple's walls on the site.

The Esagila complex, completed in its final form by Nebuchadnezzar II (604–562 BC) encasing earlier cores, was the center of Babylon. It comprised a large court (ca. 40×70 meters), containing a smaller court (ca. 25×40 meters), and finally the central shrine, consisting of an anteroom and the inner sanctum which contained the statues of Marduk and his consort Sarpanit.

According to Herodotus, Xerxes had a statue removed from the Esagila when he flooded Babylon in 482 BC, desecrated the Esagila and sacked the city. Alexander the Great ordered restorations, and the temple continued to be maintained throughout the 2nd century BC, as one of the last strongholds of Babylonian culture, such as literacy in the cuneiform script, but as Babylon was gradually abandoned under the Parthian Empire, the temple fell into decay in the 1st century BC.

Under the enormous heap of debris that lay over it, Esagila was rediscovered by Robert Koldewey in November 1900, but it did not begin to be seriously examined until 1910. The rising water table has obliterated much of the sun-dried brick and other oldest material. Most of the finds at Babylon reflect the Neo-Babylonian period and later.

This temple is square, and each side is two stadia in length. In the centre is a massive tower, of one stadium in length and breadth; on this tower stands another tower, and another again upon this, and so on up to eight.

— Herodotus (I, 178-182)

== Esagila tablet ==
Data from the Esagila tablet, which was copied from older texts in 229 BC and describes Esagila in lines 1–15 before passing on to the ziggurat of Etemenanki, have aided in the temple's reconstruction. The tablet, described by George Smith in 1872, disappeared for some time into private hands before it resurfaced and began to be interpreted.

The Esagila tablet holds Babylonian calculating methods considered to be sacred as they read in the back "let the initiate show the initiate, the non-initiate must not see this". On the front, the tablet explains the history and engineering of the 7-floor high Etemenanki temple (often thought to have inspired the Tower of Babel in the Bible).
