= Etemenanki =

Ziggurat in ancient Babylon

Etemenanki, Tower of Babylon
- Location within Iraq
- Coordinates: 32.536352°N 44.421102°E

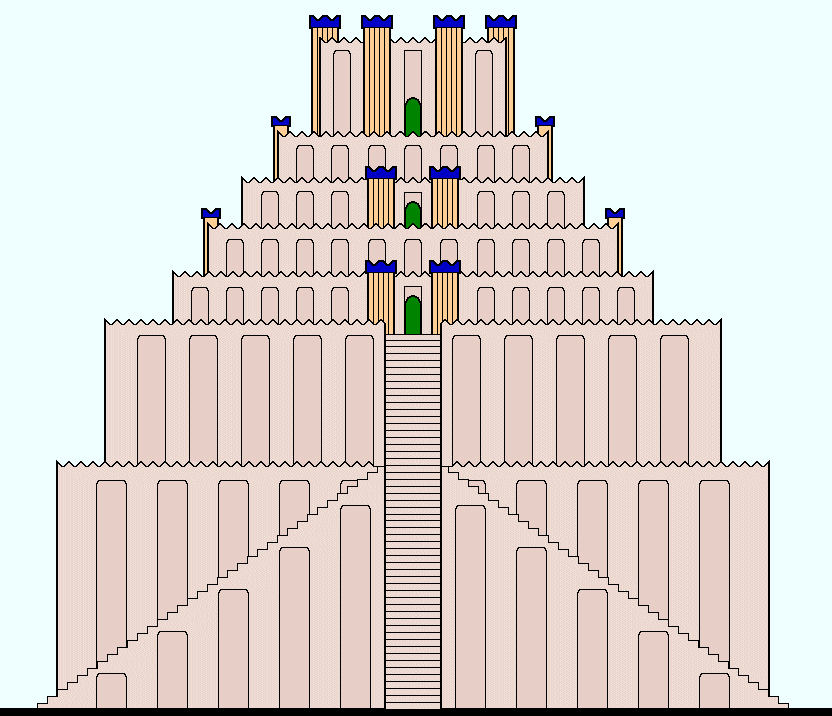
Reconstruction of Etemenanki, based on Schmid

Etemenanki (Sumerian: 𒂍𒋼𒀭𒆠, romanized: É.TEMEN.AN.KI, lit. 'Temple of the Foundation of Heaven and Earth') was a Babylonian ziggurat dedicated to the Mesopotamian god Marduk. Now in ruins, it is located about 90 kilometres (56 mi) south of Baghdad. Some scholars have proposed Etemenanki as the ziggurat that may have influenced the biblical account of the Tower of Babel.

== Construction ==
It is unclear when Etemenanki was originally constructed. Andrew R. George claims that it was constructed sometime between 1500 and 1000 BCE. He argues as follows:

The reference to a ziggurrat at Babylon in the Creation Epic (Enûma Eliš· VI 63: George 1992: 301–2) is more solid evidence, ... for a Middle Assyrian piece of this poem survives to prove the long-held theory that it existed already in the second millennium BC. There is no reason to doubt that this ziqqurrat, described as ziqqurrat apsî elite, "the upper ziqqurrat of the Apsû", was [Etemenanki].

Babylon was destroyed in 689 BCE by Sennacherib, who claims to have destroyed the Etemenanki. It took 88 years to restore the city. Work was started by the Assyrian king Esarhaddon, and continued under Nabopolassar, followed by his son Nebuchadnezzar II who rebuilt Etemenanki. The city's central feature was the temple of Marduk (Esagila), with which the Etemenanki ziggurat was associated.

Fenollós et al. note that "The 'Tower of Babel' was not built in a single moment, but rather was the result of a complex history of successive constructions, destruction and reconstruction. Its origin dates back to the reign of Hammurabi and continues to this day with its inevitable and definitive destruction." The "Tower," as discussed in ancient sources, refers to the monument as it appeared in the Neo-Babylonian period.

== Descriptions ==
A Neo-Babylonian royal inscription of Nebuchadnezzar II on a stele from Babylon, claimed to have been found in the 1917 excavation by Robert Koldewey, and of uncertain authenticity, reads: "Etemenanki Zikkurat Babibli [Ziggurat of Babylon] I made it, the wonder of the people of the world, I raised its top to heaven, made doors for the gates, and I covered it with bitumen and bricks." The building is depicted in shallow relief, showing its high first stages with paired flights of steps, five further stepped stages and the temple that surmounted the structure. A floor plan is also shown, depicting the buttressed outer walls and the inner chambers surrounding the central cella.

Foundation cylinders with inscriptions from Nabopolassar were found in the 1880s, one of which reads:

At that time my lord Marduk told me in regard to E-temen-anki, the ziqqurrat of Babylon, which before my day was (already) very weak and badly buckled, to ground its bottom on the breast of the netherworld, to make its top vie with the heavens. I fashioned mattocks, spades and brick-moulds from ivory, ebony, and musukkannu-wood, and set them in the hands of a vast workforce levied from my land. I had them shape mud bricks without number and mould-baked bricks like countless raindrops. I had the River Arahtu bear asphalt and bitumen like a mighty flood. Through the sagacity of Ea, through the intelligence of Marduk, through the wisdom of Nabû and Nissaba, by means of the vast mind that the god who created me let me possess, I deliberated with my great intellect, I commissioned the wisest experts and the surveyor established the dimensions with the twelve-cubit rule. The master-builders drew taut the measuring cords, they determined the limits. I sought confirmation by consulting Samas, Adad and Marduk and, whenever my mind deliberated (and) I pondered (unsure of) the dimensions, the great gods made (the truth) known to me by the procedure of (oracular) confirmation. Through the craft of exorcism, the wisdom of Ea and Marduk, I purified that place and made firm its foundation platform on its ancient base. In its foundations I laid out gold, silver, gemstones from mountain and sea. Under the brickwork, I set heaps of shining sapsu, sweet-scented oil, aromatics and red earth. I fashioned representations of my royal likeness bearing a soil-basket and positioned (them) variously in the foundation platform. I bowed my neck to my lord Marduk. I rolled up my garment, my kingly robe, and carried on my head bricks and earth (i.e. mud bricks). I had soil-baskets made of gold and silver and made Nebuchadnezzar, my firstborn son, beloved of my heart, carry alongside my workmen earth mixed with wine, oil and resin-chips. I made Nabûsumilisir, his brother, a boy, issue of my body, my darling younger son, take up mattock and spade. I burdened him with a soil-basket of gold and silver and bestowed him on my lord Marduk as a gift.I constructed the building, the replica of E-sarra, in joy and jubilation and raised its top as high as a mountain. For my lord Marduk I made it an object fitting for wonder, just as it was in former times.

In 2003 scholars discovered in the Schøyen Collection the oldest known representation of the Etemenanki. Carved on a black stone, the "Tower of Babel Stele", as it is known, dates to 604–562 BCE, the time of Nebuchadnezzar II.

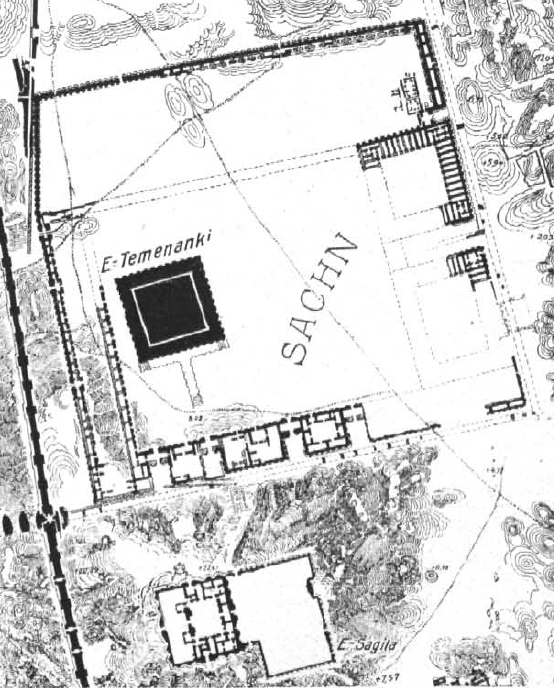
Plan of the site

The Etemenanki is described in a cuneiform tablet from Uruk from 229 BCE, a copy of an older text (now in the Louvre, Paris and referred to as the "Esagila" tablet). Translated in 1876 by Assyriologist George Smith, it gives the height of the tower as seven stocks (91 meters) with a square base of 91 meters on each side. This mudbrick structure was confirmed by excavations conducted by Robert Koldewey after 1913. Large stairs were discovered at the south side of the building, where a triple gate connected it with the Esagila. A larger gate to the east connected the Etemenanki with the sacred procession road (now reconstructed in the Pergamon Museum, Berlin).

Until the first translation of the "Esagila" tablet, details of Babylon's ziggurat were known only from the ancient Greek historian Herodotus, who wrote in the mid-5th century BCE:

The center of each division of the town was occupied by a fortress. In the one stood the palace of the kings, surrounded by a wall of great strength and size: in the other was the sacred precinct of Jupiter [Zeus] Belus, a square enclosure two furlongs ("furlong" was the translation used for "stadioi" which are both roughly 600ft) which each way, with gates of solid brass; which was also remaining in my time. In the middle of the precinct there was a tower of solid masonry, a furlong in length and breadth, upon which was raised a second tower, and on that a third, and so on up to eight. The ascent to the top is on the outside, by a path which winds round all the towers. When one is about half-way up, one finds a resting-place and seats, where persons can sit for some time on their way to the summit. On the topmost tower there is a spacious temple, and inside the temple stands a couch of unusual size, richly adorned, with a golden table by its side. There is no statue of any kind set up in the place, nor is the chamber occupied of nights by any one but a single native woman, who, as the Chaldeans [i.e. the Babylonians], the priests of this god, affirm, is chosen for himself by the deity out of all the women of the land.

This Tower of Jupiter Belus is believed to refer to the Akkadian god Bel, whose name has been Hellenised by Herodotus to Zeus Belus. It is likely that it corresponds to Etemenanki. Herodotus does not say that he visited Babylon or the ziggurat, however; the account contains multiple inaccuracies and is most likely second hand.

== Final demolition ==
In 331 BCE, Alexander the Great captured Babylon and ordered repairs to the Etemenanki. When Alexander returned to the city in 323 BCE, he noted that no progress had been made, and ordered his army to demolish the entire building in order to prepare a final rebuilding. His death, however, prevented the reconstruction. The Babylonian Chronicles and Astronomical Diaries record several attempts to rebuild the Etemenanki, which were always preceded by removing the last debris of the original ziggurat. The Ruin of Esagila Chronicle mentions that the Seleucid crown prince Antiochus I decided to rebuild it and made a sacrifice in preparation. However, while there, he stumbled on the rubble and fell. He then angrily ordered his elephant drivers to destroy the last of the remains. There are no later references to the Etemenanki from antiquity.

== Modern hypotheses regarding height ==
Modern scholars dispute the claim by the ancient Babylonian source (the "Esagila" tablet) that the Etemenanki was 91 meters tall.

[The modern] interpretation of Esagil's text raises a serious technical problem: the excessive height of the first two terraces of the ziggurat and the total height of the building defy the laws of statics and compressive strength of a material such as raw earth brick.

Even allowing variation in the design of a six-level terraced structure, at that height, the compression stress on the structure would be somewhere around two to three times as much as comparable structures of the same time period. Fenollós et al. propose that, assuming the structure did indeed use a six-level terrace design as depicted in the Tower of Babel stele, the ziggurat was probably closer to 54 meters tall. The temple at the top contributed another 12 meters in height, for a total height of 66 meters.

== In popular culture ==
In the Portugal Pack of the video game Civilization VI, Etemenanki was introduced as one of the world wonders.

In the 2022 video game Ixion, the Etemenanki was a massive UN-built arkship carrying the survivors of Earth after the planet was rendered uninhabitable after a disaster.

== Image gallery ==
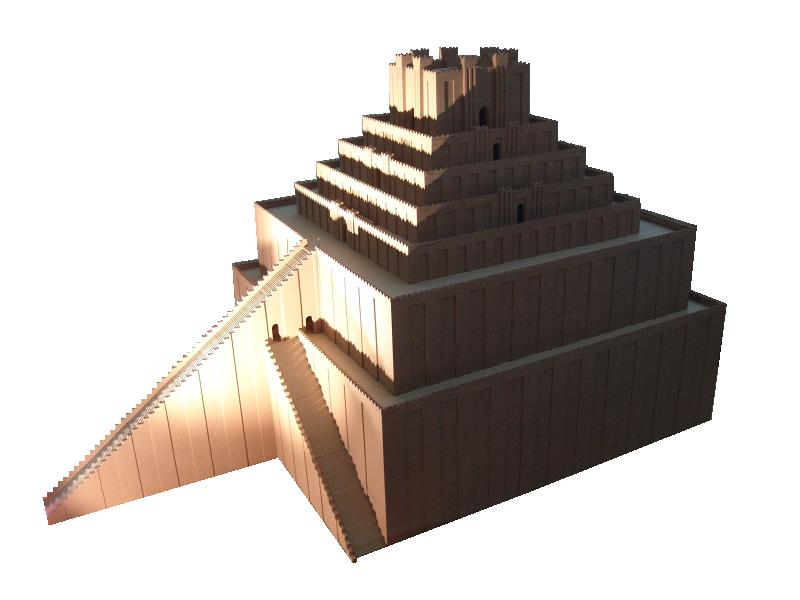
Model at the Pergamon Museum of Berlin

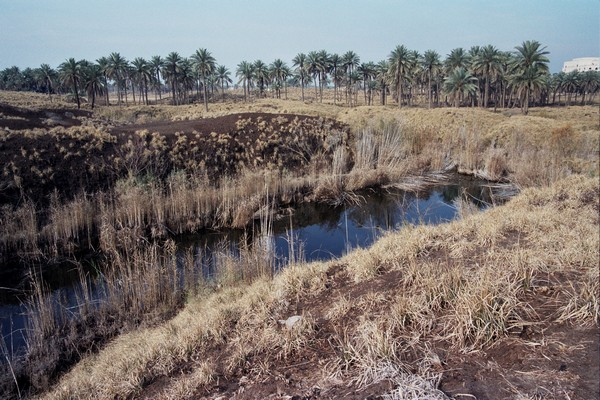
Remains of the foundations

== See also ==
- List of tallest structures built before the 20th century
