= Akkadian royal titulary =

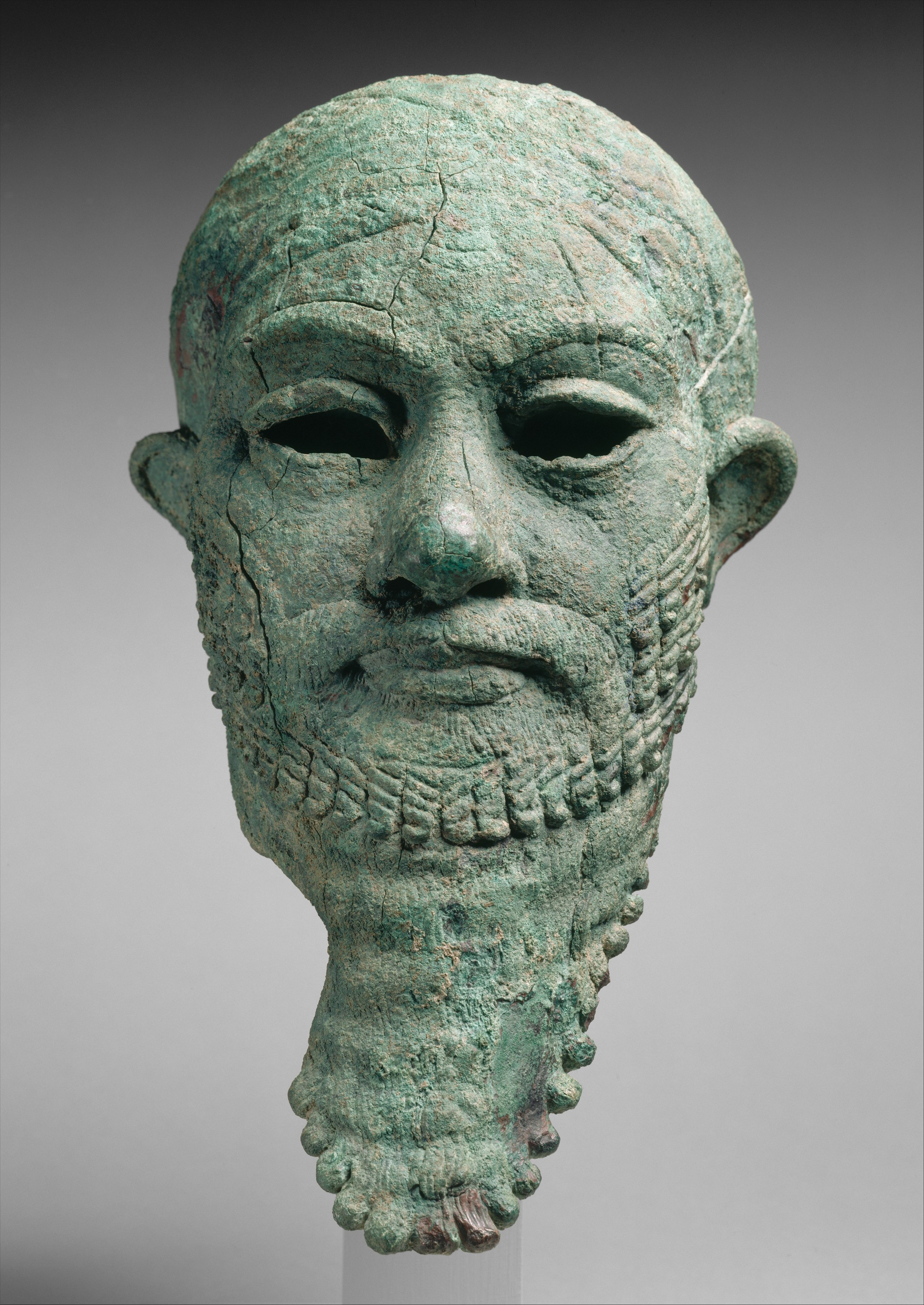
Head of an ancient Mesopotamian or Iranian ruler, 2300–2000 BC, housed in the Metropolitan Museum of Art, New York.

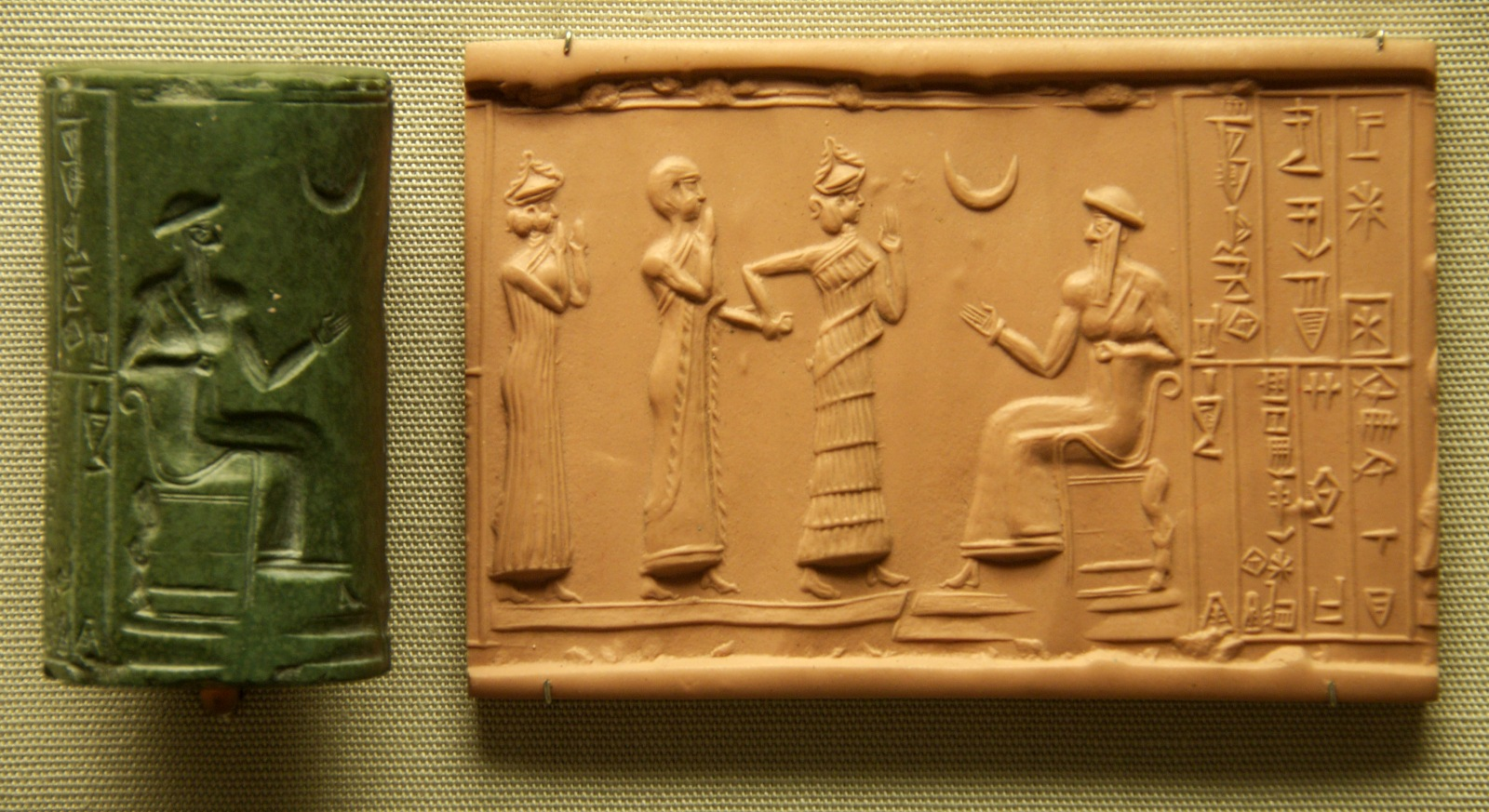
Seal of the Neo-Sumerian king Ur-Nammu in the British Museum. The inscription gives Ur-Nammu's titulature as "Ur-Nammu, strong man, king of Ur".

Akkadian or Mesopotamian royal titulary refers to the royal titles and epithets (and the style they were presented in) assumed by monarchs in Ancient Mesopotamia from the Akkadian period to the fall of the Neo-Babylonian Empire (roughly 2334 to 539 BC), with some scant usage in the later Achaemenid and Seleucid periods. The titles and the order they were presented in varied from king to king, with similarities between kings usually being because of a king's explicit choice to align himself with a predecessor. Some titles, like the Akkadian šar kibrāt erbetti ("king of the Four Corners of the World") and šar kiššatim ("king of the Universe") and the Neo-Sumerian šar māt Šumeri u Akkadi ("king of Sumer and Akkad") would remain in use for more than a thousand years through several different empires and others were only used by a single king.

In the Akkadian-speaking kingdoms of Assyria and Babylonia, distinct styles of Akkadian titulature would develop, retaining titles and elements of earlier kings but applying new royal traditions. In Assyrian royal titulary, emphasis would typically be placed on the strength and power of the king whilst Babylonian royal titulary would usually focus on the protective role and the piety of the king. Monarchs who controlled both Assyria and Babylon (such as some of the Neo-Assyrian kings) often used "hybrid" titularies combining aspects of both. Such hybrid titularies are also recorded for the only known examples of Akkadian titularies beyond the fall of the Neo-Babylonian Empire, employed by Cyrus the Great (r. 559–530 BC) of the Achaemenid Empire and Antiochus I (r. 281–261 BC) of the Seleucid Empire, who also introduced some aspects of their own royal ideologies.

== History ==
Mesopotamian royal titles vary in their contents, epithets and order depending on the ruler, dynasty and the length of a monarch's reign. Patterns of arrangement and the choice of titles and epithets usually reflect specific kings, which also meant that later rulers attempting to emulate an earlier great king often aligned themselves with their great predecessors through the titles, epithets and order chosen. As such, Akkadian-language royal inscriptions can be important sources on the royal ideology of any one given king and in exploring sociocultural factors during the reigns of individual kings.

=== Origins ===
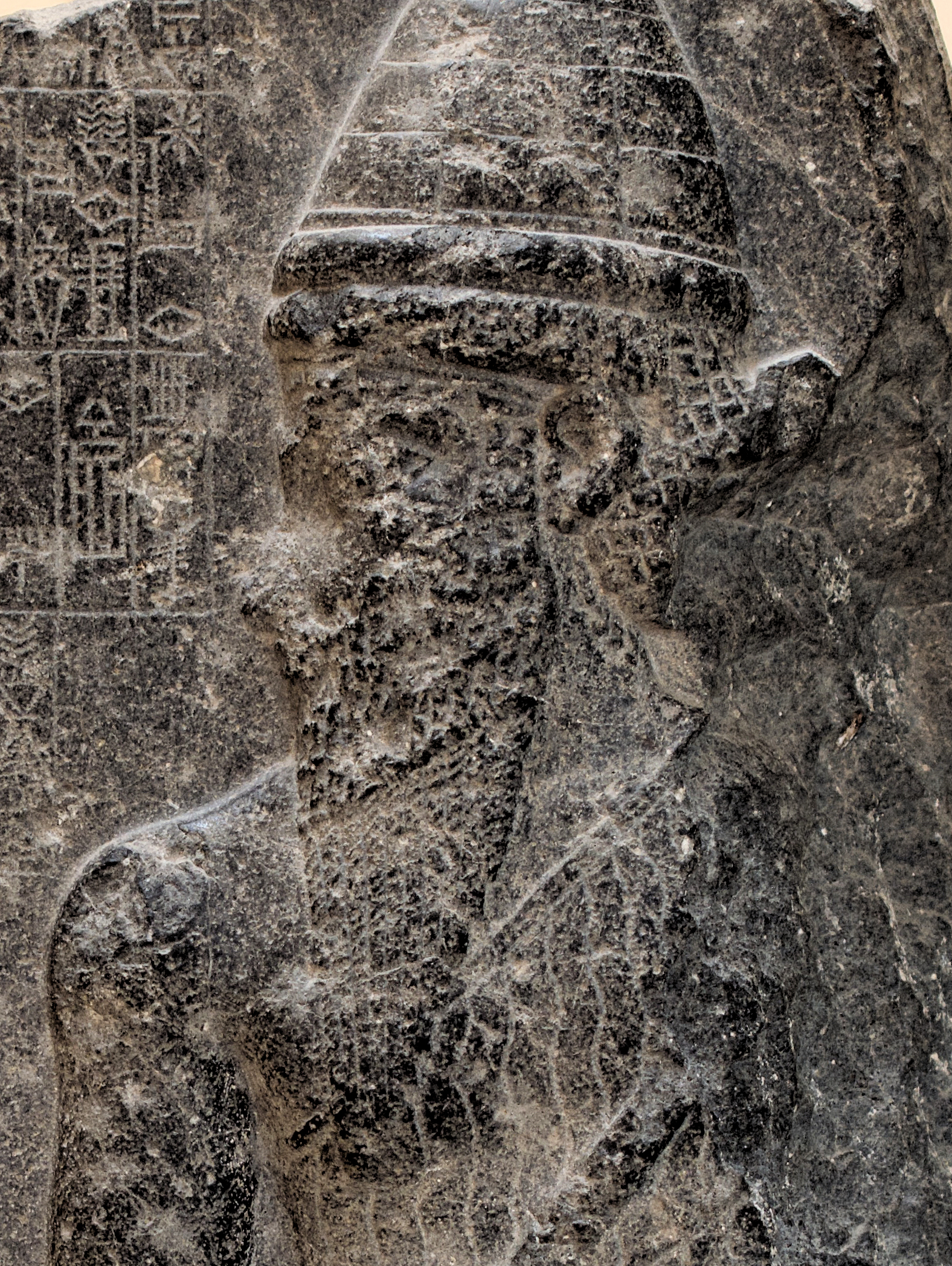
Relief with Naram-Sin of Akkad's portrait. Naram-Sin, who reigned between 2254 and 2218 BC, has been described as the first great "innovator" when it comes to Mesopotamian royal titles. Relief today housed at the Istanbul Archaeological Museum.

Though there had been kings (and thus obviously royal titles) in Mesopotamia since prehistoric times, the first great "innovator" of royal titles was Naram-Sin of Akkad (r. 2254–2218 BC), the grandson of Sargon of Akkad and the fourth ruler of the Akkadian Empire. Naram-Sin introduced the idea of kingship in the four corners (e.g. the four inhabited regions of the Earth) with the title "King of the Four Corners of the World", probably in geographical terms expressing his dominion over the regions Elam, Subartu, Amurru and Akkad (representing east, north, west and south respectively). It is possible that Naram-Sin might have been inspired to claim the title following his conquest of the city Ebla, in which quadripartite divisions of the world and the universe were prominent parts of the city's ideology and beliefs. Naram-Sin was also the first king to claim divinity for himself during his lifetime. Though both his father Manishtushu and his grandfather Sargon were recognized as divine, they had only been deified posthumously. The adoption of the title "God of Akkad" may have been due to Naram-Sin winning a great victory over a large-scale revolt against his rule. Naram-Sin was also the first Mesopotamian ruler to adopt the epithet dannum ("mighty").

Another title heavily associated with the Akkadian rulers was šar kiššatim. The literal translation of this title is "King of Kish", Kish being one of the more prestigious Sumerian cities, often having been seen in the times preceding the Akkadian Empire as having some sort of primacy over the other cities in the region. Use of the title, which was not limited to kings actually in possession of the city itself, implied that the ruler was a builder of cities, victorious in war and a righteous judge. By the time of Sargon of Akkad, "King of Kish" meant a divinely authorized ruler with the right to rule over all of Sumer, it might have begun to refer to some sort of a universal rule already in the centuries before Sargon's rise to power. Through its use by Sargon of Akkad and his successors, the title would be altered in meaning from "King of Kish" to the more boastful "King of the Universe", which is how later rulers would interpret it for more than a thousand years.

After the fall of Akkad, further titles would be introduced by the kings of the Third Dynasty of Ur. The founder of this dynasty, Ur-Nammu (r. 2112–2095 BC), combined the title of "king of Akkad" with the traditional "king of Sumer" in an effort to unify the north and south of Mesopotamia under his rule, creating the title of "king of Sumer and Akkad". Though the Akkadian kings had used both the titles of "king of Akkad" and "king of Sumer", the combined title was new. Sargon of Akkad had even during his reign explicitly been against linking Sumer and Akkad. There was some native Mesopotamian precedence for double titles of this kind, in the Early Dynastic III (c. 2900–2350) period, double titles were used by some kings with examples like "lord of Sumer and king of the nation" and "king of Uruk and king of Ur". These titles were unique to their respective rulers however, never appearing again, and repeated "king" at the mention of the second kingship. Ur-Nammu was acknowledged by the priesthood at Nippur and crowned as sovereign of the two lands surrounding Nippur "to right and left". The fourth king of the Third Dynasty of Ur, Amar-Sin (r. 2046–2038 BC), was the first ruler to introduce the title šarru dannu ("mighty king"), replacing the earlier epithet dannum.

When the Third Dynasty of Ur collapsed and its vassals once again became independent polities, the former vassal cities often only implicitly renounced their allegiance to Ur. Since the ruler of Ur was deified and thus technically a god, ruling titles like šar ("king") were applied to the principal deities of the cities. As a result, formerly subordinate titles such as šakkanakki and Išši’ak (both translating to "governor") became sovereign ruling titles.

=== Assyrian and Babylonian titulature ===
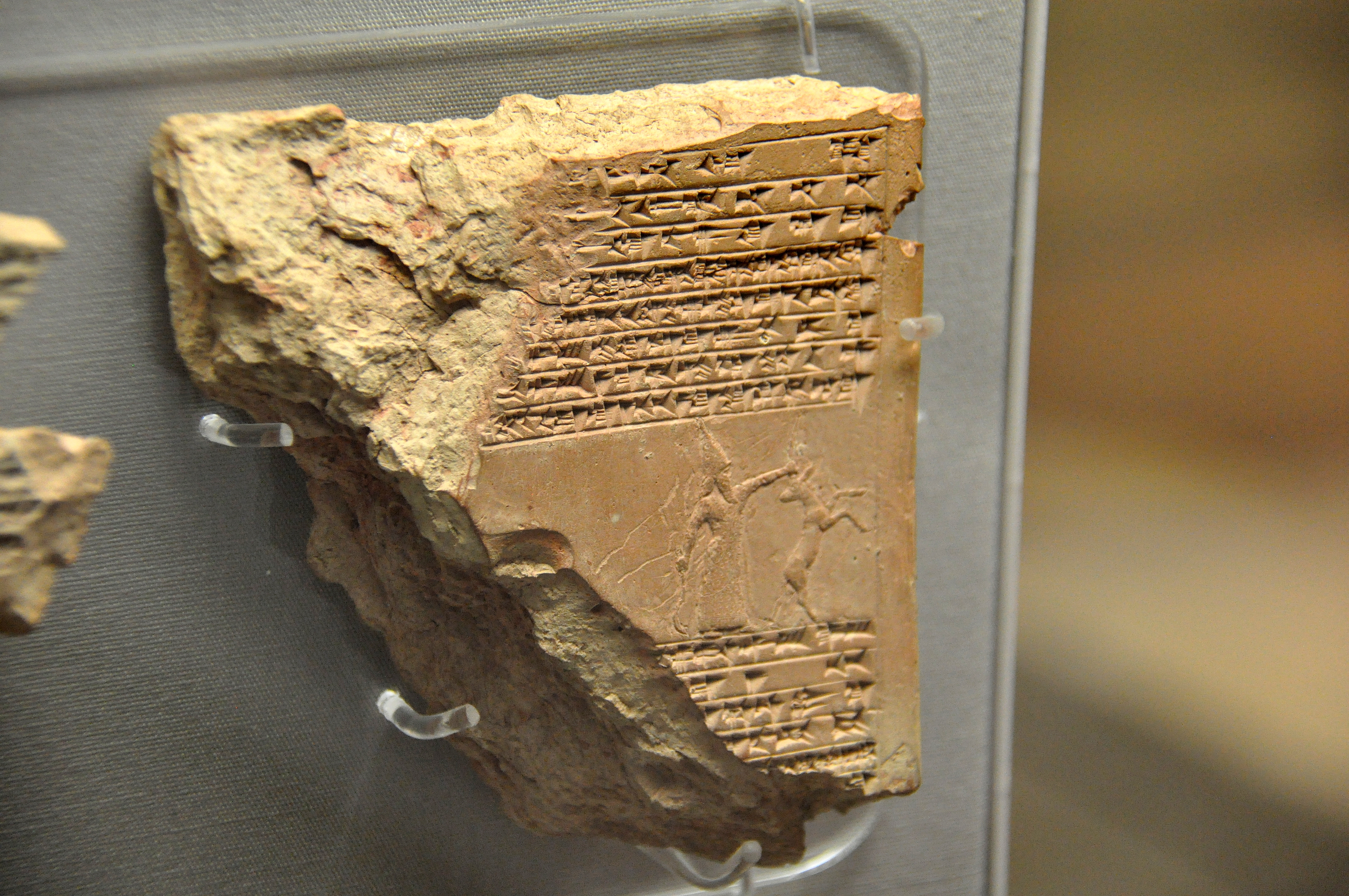
Text and seal of Shamash-shum-ukim, a Neo-Assyrian king of Babylon, featuring a depiction of the king fighting an oryx antelope. Now housed in the British Museum.

Over the course of the centuries after the fall of the Third Dynasty of Ur, the main kingdoms that would develop in Mesopotamia were Assyria in the north and Babylonia in the south. The kings of Assyria would title themselves as Išši’ak until the reign of the Middle-Assyrian king Ashur-uballit I of the 14th century BC, who once more introduced the title šar, signifying his role as an absolute monarch.

Typically, Assyrian royal inscriptions usually glorify the strength and power of the king whilst Babylonian royal inscriptions tend to focus on the protective role and the piety of the king. Assyrian titularies usually also often emphasize the royal genaeology of the king, something Babylonian titularies do not, and also drive home the king's moral and physical qualities while downplaying his role in the judicial system. Assyrian epithets about royal lineage vary in how far they stretch back, most often simply discussing lineage in terms of "son of ..." or "brother of ...". Some cases display lineage stretching back much further, Shamash-shuma-ukin (r. 667–648 BC) describes himself as a "descendant of Sargon II", his great-grandfather. More extremely, Esarhaddon (r. 681–669 BC) calls himself a "descendant of the eternal seed of Bel-bani", a king who would have lived more than a thousand years before him.

Assyrian royal titularies were often changed depending on where the titles were to be displayed, the titles of the same Assyrian king would have been different in their home country of Assyria and in conquered regions. Those Neo-Assyrian kings who controlled the city of Babylon used a "hybrid" titulary of sorts in the south, combining aspects of the Assyrian and Babylonian tradition, similar to how the traditional Babylonian deities were promoted in the south alongside the Assyrian main deity of Ashur. The assumption of many traditional southern titles, including the ancient "king of Sumer and Akkad", by the Assyrian kings served to legitimize their rule and assert their control over Babylon and lower Mesopotamia. Epithets like "chosen by the god Marduk and the goddess Sarpanit" and "favourite of the god Ashur and the goddess Mullissu", both assumed by Esarhaddon, illustrate that he was both Assyrian (Ashur and Mullissu, the main pair of Assyrian deities) and a legitimate ruler over Babylon (Marduk and Sarpanit, the main pair of Babylonian deities).

Most of the Neo-Assyrian titles that speak of the king's prowess, e.g. "great king", "mighty king" and even the old "king of the Universe", a title dating back to Akkadian times, were not carried over into the succeeding Neo-Babylonian Empire with two exceptions. The founder of the Neo-Babylonian empire, Nabopolassar (r. 625–605 BC) uses some of the titles (prominently "mighty king") in his early inscriptions, possibly due to his family originating as high-ranking officials for the Assyrians (a fact he otherwise was careful to mask). The final ruler of the Neo-Babylonian empire, Nabonidus (r. 556–539 BC), took all three of the Assyrian titles in inscriptions late in his reign, deliberately aligning himself with the Neo-Assyrian kings, possibly to claim a universal empire as in the Assyrian model.

=== Achaemenid and Seleucid use ===
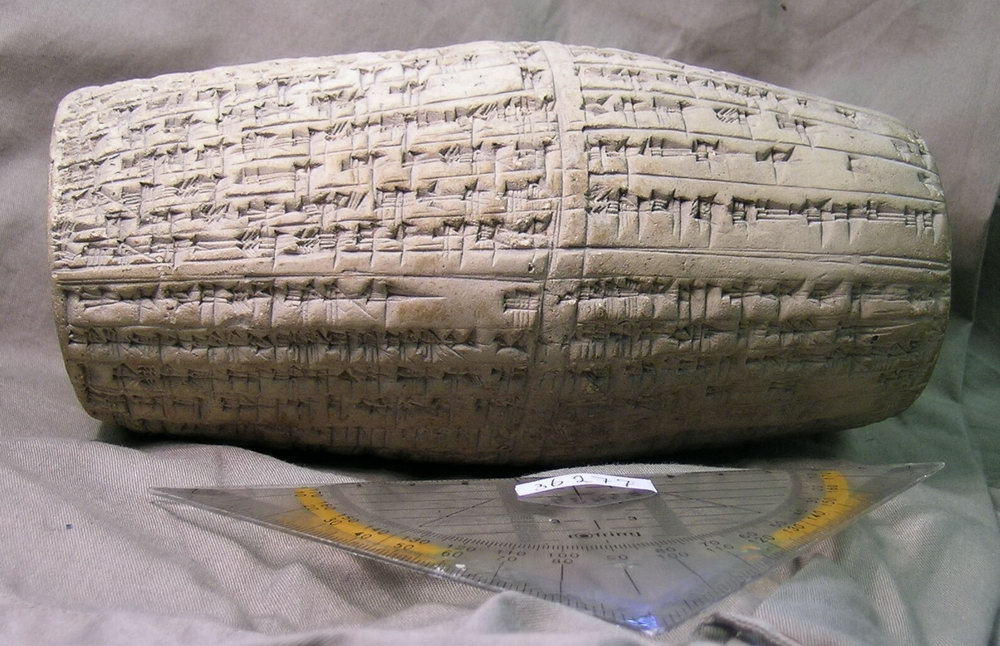
The Antiochus Cylinder of Antiochus I of the Seleucid Empire contains the last known example of a royal titulary written in Akkadian. The cylinder is today housed at the British Museum.

In the Cyrus Cylinder, Cyrus the Great of the Achaemenid Empire assumes many native Mesopotamian title following his 539 BC conquest of Babylon. Much like the late inscriptions of Nabonidus, the Cyrus Cylinder corresponds more to the traditional Assyrian royal titulary than it does the Babylonian. When the Assyrian kings conquered Babylon, they titled themselves as both kings of Babylon and kings of Assyria. Since they were not technically legitimate Babylonian rulers in that they had not been born to the Babylonian throne, they stressed their legitimacy by deriving their kingship from the fact that they had held royal status before conquering Babylon. Cyrus does much the same in the Cyrus Cylinder, stressing that his father and grandfather were "kings of Anšan" and that Cyrus was the "heir to an eternal line of kingship".

The Antiochus Cylinder, which describes how Antiochus I (r. 281–261 BC) of the Seleucid Empire rebuilt the Ezida Temple in the city of Borsippa, is one of the last known documents written in Akkadian, separated from the previous Cyrus Cylinder by around 300 years. This cylinder also contains the last known example of an Akkadian-language royal titulary, applied to Antiochus himself. It is an important source on the self-presentation of Seleucid kings and on the relations between the Seleucid rulers and the inhabitants of Babylon (located near the recently founded Seleucid capital of Seleucia). The text of the cylinder as a whole combines and reshapes elements from the Babylonian and Assyrian traditions of royal titularies, sometimes breaking with tradition to introduce aspects of the Seleucid royal ideology.

Though the titulature of Antiochus I used in the cylinder has in the past been interpreted as very traditionally Babylonian in its composition, especially compared to that of Nebuchadnezzar II (r. 605–562 BC) of the Neo-Babylonian empire, only two titles in the Antiochus Cylinder actually align with titles consistently used by the Neo-Babylonian kings (those being "king of Babylon" and "provider of Esagila and Ezida". Other titles in the cylinder, including "great king", "mighty king" and "king of the Universe" are more characteristic of the Neo-Assyrian kings.

Out of the titularies of all previous kings, the titulary of Antiochus most closely resembles that of Nabonidus in its arrangement though they are not identical, that of Antiochus combining Assyrian, Babylonian and Persian titles. It is possible given the large amount of time separating the Antiochus Cylinder from the last known previous example (the Cyrus Cylinder) and the rather simply and short nature of the titulary that it mixes traditions and ideas due to the limited amount of sources the scribe would have had to work with, but royal titularies were usually created with great care and consideration. It is possible that the mixture was chosen to specifically reflect a more Seleucid version of kingship, Assyrian titles like "mighty king" and "great king" fitting with the warrior king-idea used by the Seleucids in the rest of their empire. Universalizing titles like "king of the Universe" may have simply been appealing in lacking a geographical specification and that the king would not have to confine his realm to include just Babylon or Mesopotamia (which would have resulted from a title like "king of Sumer and Akkad"). Similar to how Cyrus the Great stressed that his lineage was royal despite him not being born to the Babylonian throne, Antiochus titulary contains the information that he is the son and heir of Seleucus I Nicator (the first Seleucid king, r. 305–281 BC), who is referred to as "the Macedonian", connecting him with the kingship of Alexander the Great and his line and granting Antiochus further legitimacy.

== Examples of titles ==
=== Titles centering on the king's person ===
Descriptive titles similar to epithets, titles which center on the king's person. Titles and epithets which relate to the personality and position of the king account for about 24.9% of Neo-Assyrian titularies.

English translation of title	Title in Akkadian	Notes
Great king	šarru rabû	Popular title designating the king as powerful enough to draw the respect of their adversaries, frequently used in diplomacy with other nations. Example users: Sargon II, Esarhaddon
King who has no equals in all of the lands	šarru ša ina kullat mātāti māḫiri lā īšû	Only recorded for Esarhaddon (r. 681–669 BC) and Ashurbanipal (r. 669–631 BC). Example users: Esarhaddon, Ashurbanipal
Strong king Alternatively "Mighty king"	šarru dannu	A popular title, especially in Assyria. Example users: Sargon II, Esarhaddon

=== Titles centering on the king's relationship to the world ===
Titles describing the domain under the control of a king. Titles and epithets which relate to the worldly position of the king account for about 35.8% of Neo-Assyrian titularies.

==== Specific locations and peoples ====
English translation of title	Title in Akkadian	Notes
Governor of Assyria; Alternatively "Viceroy of the god Assur"	Išši’ak Aššur	Ruling title of the Old and Middle Assyrian kings. Example user: Shamshi-Adad I
Governor of Babylon	šakkanakki Bābili	Ruling title of the Old Babylonian kings. Title employed by some Assyrian kings who ruled over Babylon. Example users: Sargon II, Esarhaddon
Kassite king	šar Kaššu	Title used by the Kassite dynasty of Babylon. Example users: Agum III, Karaindash
King of Akkad	šar māt Akkadi	Literally "king of the land of Akkad". Combined with "king of Sumer" by Ur-Nammu (r. 2112–2095 BC), thereafter only occurs in the combined form "king of Sumer and Akkad". Example user: Ur-Nammu
King of Assyria	šar māt Aššur	Literally "king of the land of Assur". Ruling title of the Neo-Assyrian kings. Example users: Sargon II, Esarhaddon
King of Babylon	šar Bābili	Ruling title of monarchs of Babylon. Example users: Sargon II, Esarhaddon, Shamash-shum-ukin
King of Babylon	šar māt Bābil	Literally "king of the land of Babylon". Rare variant of the Babylonian royal title recorded for some Kassite kings. Example users: Agum III, Karaindash
King of Karduniaš	šar Karduniaš	Title used by the Kassite dynasty of Babylon, "Karduniaš" being the Kassite name for the kingdom centered in Babylon. Example users: Agum III, Karaindash
King of Padan and Alman	šar māt Padan u Alman	Literally "king of the land of Padan and Alman". Title only recorded for Agum III of Babylon (c. 1470 BC). Example user: Agum III
King of Sumer	šar māt Šumeri	Literally "king of the land of Sumer". Combined with "king of Akkad" by Ur-Nammu (r. 2112–2095 BC), thereafter only occurs in the combined form "king of Sumer and Akkad". Example user: Ur-Nammu
King of the Akkadians	šar Akkadi	Variant of šar māt Akkadi only recorded for Agum III of Babylon (c. 1470 BC). Example user: Agum III
King of the Amnanu	šar Amnānu	Expressing kingship over the Amnanu, an Amorite tribal group settled in Babylonia. Only recorded for Shamash-shum-ukin (r. 667–648 BC). Example user: Shamash-shum-ukin
King of the Kassites	šar Kašši	Title used by the Kassite dynasty of Babylon. Example users: Agum III, Karaindash

==== Dominance over Mesopotamia ====
English translation of title	Title in Akkadian	Notes
Glorious King of the Lands	šar mātāti šarhu	Variant of "King of the Lands" recorded for Ashurnasirpal II (r. 883–859 BC) and Shalmaneser III (r. 859–824 BC). Example users: Ashurnasirpal II, Shalmaneser III
King of Kings	šar šarrāni	Introduced by Tukulti-Ninurta I of Assyria (r. 1233–1197 BC), "King of Kings" became an especially prominent title during the Achaemenid Empire after which it would be used in Iran and elsewhere up until modern times. Example users: Tukulti-Ninurta I, Mithridates II
King of Sumer and Akkad	šar māt Šumeri u Akkadi	Ruling title in the Third Dynasty of Ur, used for more than 1,500 years in later empires trying to claim its and the Akkadian Empire's legacy. Example users: Ur-Nammu, Hammurabi, Esarhaddon, Cyrus
King of the Lands	šar mātāti	Introduced in its simplified form by Ashurbanipal (r. 669–631 BC). Saw occasional later use in the Achaemenid, Seleucid and Parthian Empires. Example users: Ashurbanipal, Cyrus, Phraates II

==== Claims to universal rule ====
English translation of title	Title in Akkadian	Notes
King of All Peoples	šar kiššat nišē	Recorded for two Middle Assyrian kings and two Neo-Assyrian kings. Example users: Tukulti-Ninurta I, Ashurnasirpal II
King of All the Four Corners of the World	šar kullat kibrāt erbetti	Variant of "King of the Four Corners of the World" used in the Middle Assyrian Empire. Example users: Tiglath-Pileser I, Ashur-bel-kala
King of the Four Corners of the World; Alternatively "King of the Four Corners of the Universe", usually shortened to "King of the Four Corners"	šar kibrāt erbetti šar kibrāti arba'i šarru kibrat 'arbaim	Popular title introduced by Naram-Sin (r. 2254–2218 BC). Used in a succession of later empires until its final use by Cyrus the Great (r. 559–530 BC). Example users: Naram-Sin, Ashurnasirpal II, Hammurabi, Cyrus
King of the Totality of the Four Corners including all their rulers	šar kiššat kibrāte ša napḫar malkī kalîšunu	Variant of "King of the Four Corners of the World" recorded for Ashurnasirpal II (r. 883–859 BC) and Shalmaneser III (r. 859–824 BC). Example users: Ashurnasirpal II, Shalmaneser III
King of the Universe; Alternatively "King of All" or "King of the World"	šar kiššatim šarru kiššat māti šar-kiššati'	Popular title introduced by Sargon of Akkad (r 2334–2284 BC). Used in a succession of later empires until its final use by Antiochus I (r. 281–261 BC). Example users: Sargon, Esarhaddon, Nabonidus, Cyrus

=== Titles centering on the king's relationship to the divine ===
Titles describing the position of the king relative to the deities of the Ancient Mesopotamian religion. Titles and epithets which relate to the divine position of the king account for about 38.8% of Neo-Assyrian titularies.

English translation of title	Title in Akkadian	Notes
Governor of Ashur	šakkanakki Aššur	Separated from Išši’ak Aššur in that this title refers to being a governor explicitly on behalf of the god Ashur, not as governing the region of Assyria. Example user: Shalmaneser III
Governor of the Great Gods	šakkanakki ilāni rabûti	Only recorded for Shalmaneser III (r. 859–824 BC). Example user: Shalmaneser III
Humble king	šarru šaḫtu	The title speaks about humility before the gods, the king would not have shown inferiority towards other rulers. Example user: Esarhaddon
King who is his favourite	šarru migrišu	"His", "her" and "their" refers to the deities of ancient Mesopotamia. Example users: Esarhaddon, Ashurbanipal
King who is her favourite	šarru migriša	"His", "her" and "their" refers to the deities of ancient Mesopotamia. Example users: Esarhaddon, Ashurbanipal
King who is their favourite	šarru migrišun	"His", "her" and "their" refers to the deities of ancient Mesopotamia. Example users: Esarhaddon, Ashurbanipal
King who fears him	šarru pāliḫšu	"Him", "her" and "them" refers to the deities of ancient Mesopotamia. Example user: Esarhaddon
King who fears her	šarru pāliḫša	"Him", "her" and "them" refers to the deities of ancient Mesopotamia. Example user: Esarhaddon
King who fears them	šarru pāliḫšun	"Him", "her" and "them" refers to the deities of ancient Mesopotamia. Example user: Esarhaddon
King who provides for him	šarru zāninšu	"Him", "her" and "them" refers to the deities of ancient Mesopotamia. Example user: Sargon II
King who provides for her	šarru zāninša	"Him", "her" and "them" refers to the deities of ancient Mesopotamia. Example user: Sargon II
King who provides for them	šarru zāninšun	"Him", "her" and "them" refers to the deities of ancient Mesopotamia. Example user: Sargon II
Provider of Esagila and Ezida	zānin Esagil u Ezida	One of the most common royal titles of the Neo-Assyrian and Neo-Babylonian periods, used by nearly all kings. Example users: Sargon II, Nebuchadnezzar II

== Epithets ==
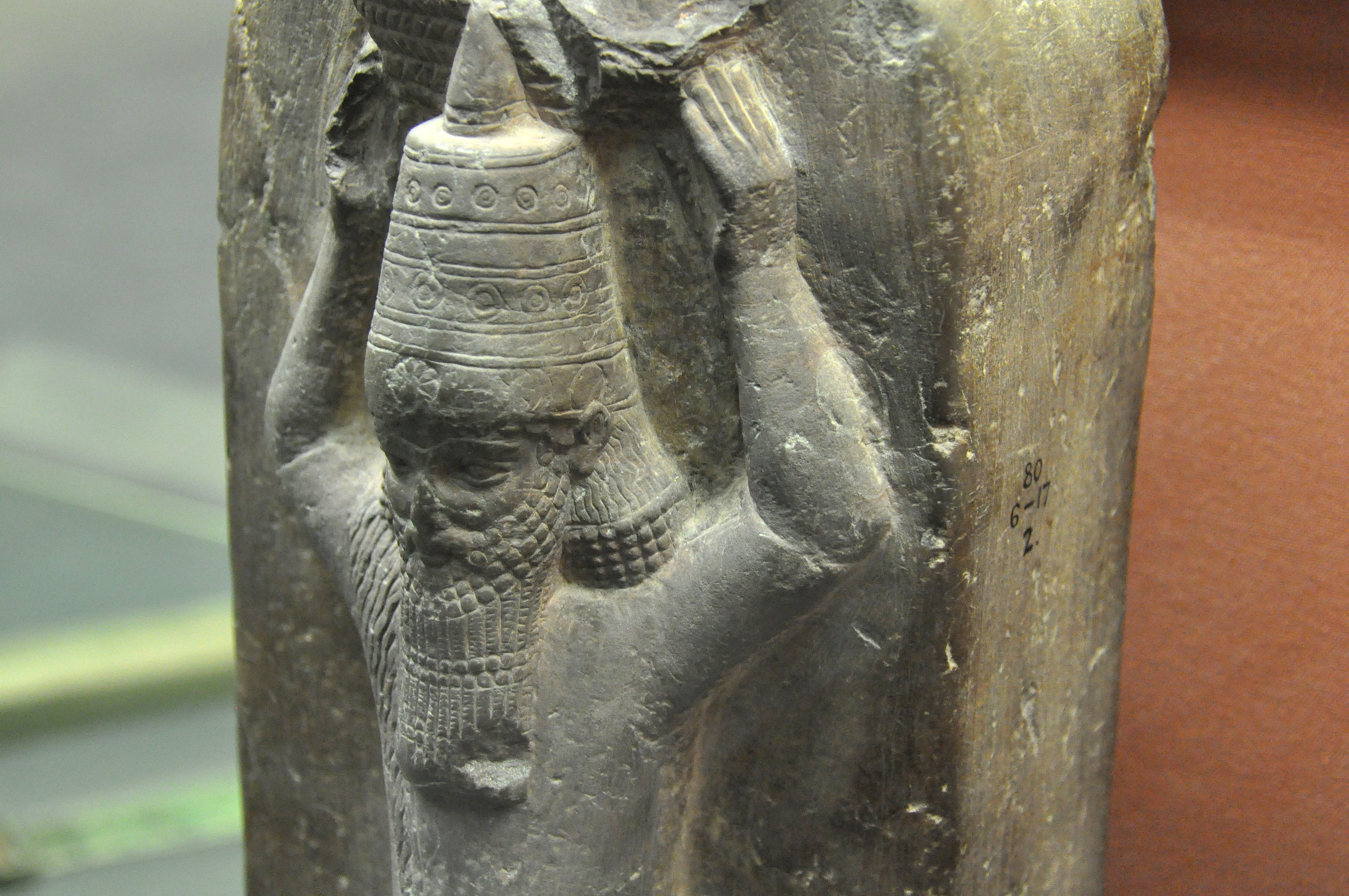
Detail of a stone monument of Ashurbanipal of Assyria as a basket-bearer. Kings only expressed inferiority and humility before the divine, often using epithets to describe themselves as "providers" for the gods. Currently housed in the British Museum.

Royal epithets generally served to highlight the qualities of a specific king, many rulers having at least some unique epithets. Typical of Babylonian titles is focusing on the benevolent and coercive attributes of any one given king with only few references to violence. Neo-Assyrian rulers, including Ashurbanipal, Esarhaddon and Shamash-shuma-ukin, frequently employed the epithet rē’û kēnu (meaning "righteous shepherd") to illustrate royal benevolence. Wisdom and competence are also common points of focus, Esarhaddon is for instance referred to as itpēšu ḫāsis kal šipri ("competent one who knows every craft").

Many epithets are religious in nature, usually focusing on the king as a "provider" (zānin) for the gods in some capacity, provider here meaning that the king is fulfilling his duty of providing required nourishments for the deities and keeping their temples in good condition. Considering the boastful nature of Esarhaddon's titles, his epithet kanšu ("submissive") may seem strange, his title šarru šaḫtu ("humble king") likewise so, but these titles refer to humility and inferiority in regards to the gods, for which this was appropriate. The Assyrian king would never have acknowledged inferiority in the earthly sphere.

Epithets often also illustrate the king as selected to rule by the gods, the chosen words typically being migru ("favourite") and/or nibītu ("designate"). Shamash-shuma-ukin refers to himself as migir Enlil Šamaš u Marduk ("favourite of Enlil, Shamash and Marduk") and Esarhaddon refers to himself as nibīt Marduk Ṣarpanītu ("designate of Marduk (and) Sarpanit"). Marking the Assyrian king as the choice of the gods would have further legitimized his rule. The king respecting the divine is sometimes expressed with words like palāḫu ("to fear") or takālu ("to trust in"). Ashurbanipal has the epithet rubû pāliḫšu/ša ("prince who fears him/her"). Religious epithets can also speak of the king's piety through his actions, typically focusing on construction (often utilizing the word epēšu, "build" or "make"). Shamash-shuma-ukin refers to himself as ēpiš Esagila ("he who (re)constructed Esagila"), referring to a major temple in Babylon.

Another common theme for epithets is the king's relation to his people. Esarhaddon again being an example, he refers to himself as maḫīru kīnu ešēru ebūru napāš Nisaba ušaššû ina māti ("he who brought stable prices, successful harvests, (and) an abundance of grain to the land").

Assyrian epithets often emphasize the king as a military leader and relates war to the divine as an issue part of the idea of universal rule. Epithets like "the god Aššur gave me the power to let cities fall into ruins and to enlarge Assyrian territory" are common.

== Examples of royal titularies ==
Old Assyrian titulary: Ashur-nirari I

In one of his inscriptions, Ashur-nirari I, who reigned 1529–1503 BC, uses the following titles:

Viceroy of the god Assur, son of Ishme-Dagan, viceroy of the god Assur, builder of the temple of Bêl, the elder.

Middle Assyrian titulary: Tukulti-Ninurta I

In one of his inscriptions, Tukulti-Ninurta I, who reigned 1233–1197 BC, uses the following titles:

King of the Universe, the mighty king, the king of Assyria, favorite of Assur, priest of Assur, rightful ruler, beloved of Ishtar, who subjected the Kuti to their farthest border; son of Shalmaneser, priest of Assur, grandson of Adad-nirari, priest of Assur.

Kassite titulary: Kurigalzu

In one of his inscriptions, the Kassite king Kurigalzu (there were two kings of this name; Kurigalzu I and Kurigalzu II, it is unclear which one of them used these titles):

Great king, mighty king, king of the Universe, favorite of Anu and Enlil, nominated (for kingship) by the lord of the gods am I! King who has no equal among all the kings his ancestors, son of Kadashman-Harbe, unrivalled king ...

Neo-Assyrian titulary: Esarhaddon

In one of his inscriptions, Esarhaddon, who reigned 681–669 BC, uses the following titles:

The great king, the mighty king, king of the Universe, king of Assyria, viceroy of Babylon, king of Sumer and Akkad, son of Sennacherib, the great king, the mighty king, king of Assyria, grandson of Sargon, the great king, the mighty king, king of Assyria; who under the protection of Assur, Sin, Shamash, Nabu, Marduk, Ishtar of Nineveh, Ishtar of Arbela, the great gods, his lords, made his way from the rising to the setting sun, having no rival.

Neo-Babylonian titulary: Nebuchadnezzar II

The titles preserved in Babylon for Nebuchadnezzar II, who reigned 605–562 BC, read as follows:

King of Babylon, true shepherd, chosen by the steadfast heart of Marduk, exalted governor, beloved of Nabu, knowing one, wise one, who pays attention to the ways of the great gods, untiring governor, provider of Esagila and Ezida

Seleucid titulary: Antiochus I

The Antiochus Cylinder is the last known Akkadian-language royal inscription, separated from the last known previous one (the Cyrus Cylinder) by 300 years. At the time it was made, Akkadian was no longer a spoken language and the cylinder's contents were likely inspired by earlier royal inscriptions by Assyrian and Babylonian kings. The Akkadian-language titulature (here translated into English) of the Seleucid king Antiochus I (r. 281–261 BC) is preserved in the Antiochus Cylinder from Babylon and reads as follows:

Great king, mighty king, king of the Universe, king of Babylon, king of the Lands, provider of Esagila and Ezida, foremost heir of Seleucus, the king, the Macedonian, king of Babylon

== See also ==
- History of institutions in Mesopotamia
