= King of the Universe =

Royal title in Ancient Mesopotamia

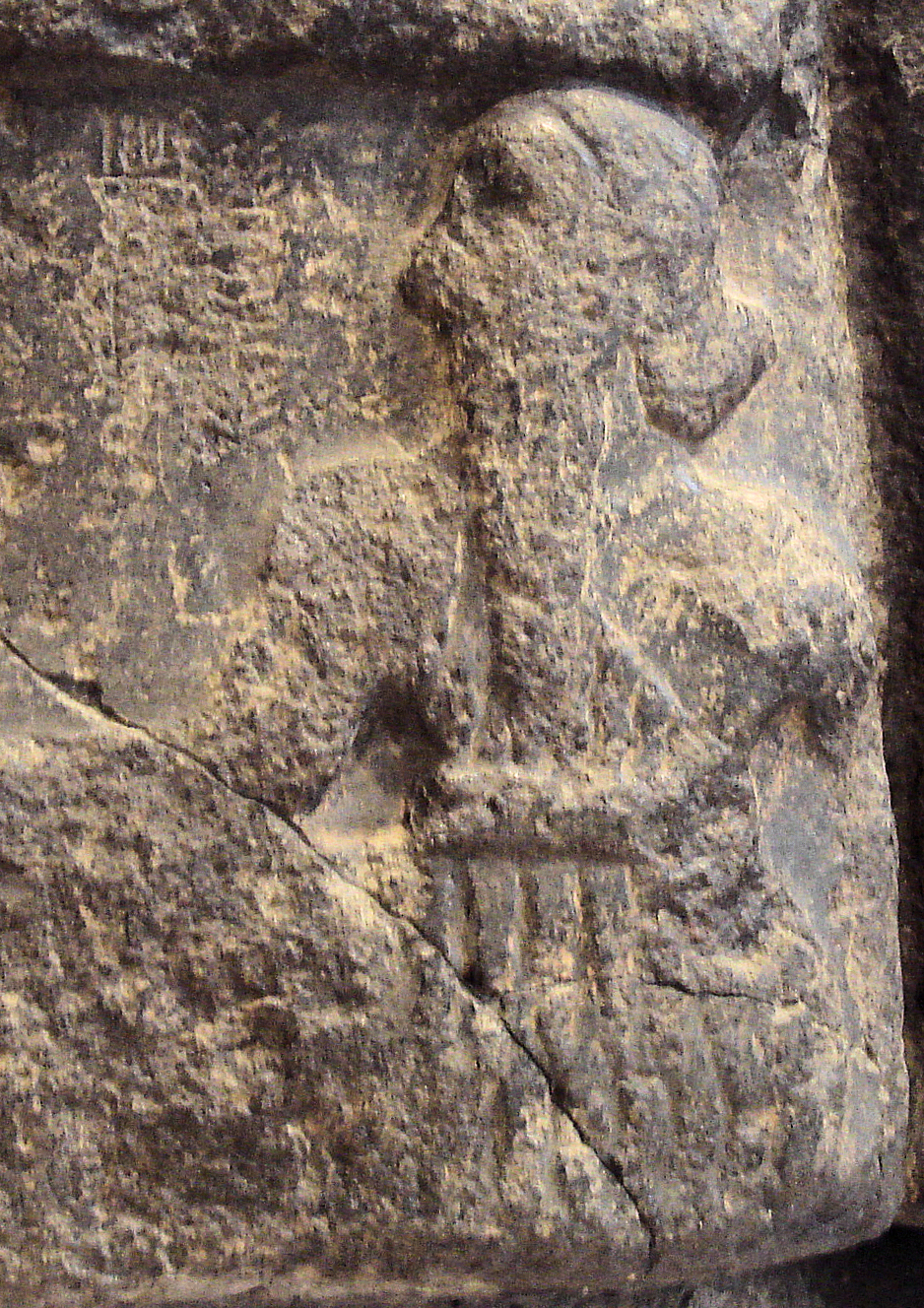
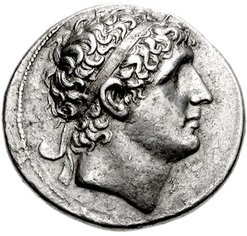
Sargon of Akkad (r. c. 2334–2279 BC, left) and Antiochus I Soter (r. 281–261 BC, right). The first and last rulers to use the Mesopotamian title šar kiššatim (King of the Universe).

King of the Universe (Note: Sumerian: lugal kiš-ki or lugal ki-sár-ra; Akkadian: šar kiššatim, šarru kiššat māti, or šar-kiššati; Hebrew: melekh haolam; Greek: kosmoubasileus or kosmōkrator; Latin: rex mundi or rex universorum) is a royal title that claims complete cosmological domination. As a historical title, King of the Universe was used intermittently by powerful monarchs in ancient Mesopotamia as a title of great prestige. Equivalent titles were sometimes later used in the Greco-Roman world as honorifics for powerful rulers. The title was also applied to various deities in ancient Mesopotamian, Greek, and Roman literature. As a religious title and honorific, King of the Universe has seen continued use as a title of God and certain other figures in the Abrahamic tradition.

The etymology of the Mesopotamian title, šar kiššatim, (Note: The Mesopotamian title literally means "King of Kish". In addition to "King of the Universe", the title in its universal context has also been translated as "King of Everything", "King of the Totality", "King of All", and "King of the World".) derives from the ancient Sumerian city of Kish. In ancient Sumer, Kish was seen as having primacy over other Mesopotamian cities and was in Sumerian legend the location where the kingship was lowered to from heaven after the legendary flood. The first ruler to use the title was Sargon of Akkad (r. c. 2334–2279 BC). The title continued to be used in a succession of later empires claiming symbolical descent from Sargon's Akkadian Empire. The last known ruler to assume the Mesopotamian title was the Seleucid king Antiochus I Soter (r. 281–261 BC).

== Mesopotamian tradition ==
=== Background ===
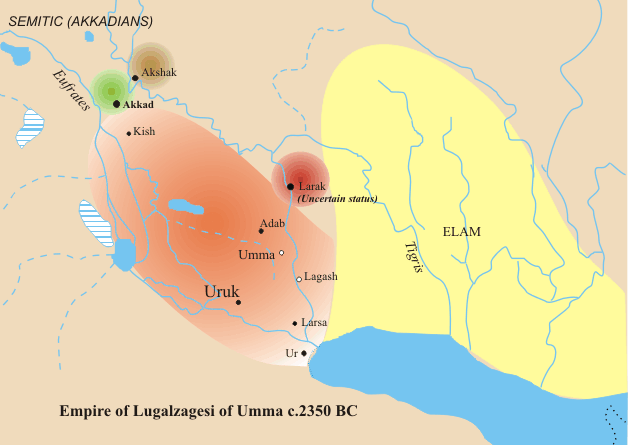
Realm of Lugal-zage-si of Uruk (in orange) c. 2350 BC, one of the first rulers to claim universal rule

In the Mesopotamian Early Dynastic Periods (c. 2900–2350 BC) many city-states (the foremost being Ur, Uruk, Lagash, Umma and Kish) in the region often invaded lands and cities far away from their own, with negligible consequences for themselves, in order to establish small empires to gain or keep a superior position relative to the other city-states. The most powerful rulers could assume more prestigious title, such as the style of lugal. (Note: Lugal literally means "big man" but is often interpreted as "king". The title probably has a military connotation. Several titles were used by rulers during this period. Lugal is often seen as a title primarily based on a ruler's military prowess, whilst en (another common ruling title) seems to have implied a more priestly role.) It is likely that most rulers called lugal in the surviving sources had acquired that title through their own campaigns rather than inheriting it.

The quest to eclipse the prestige and power of other city-states gradually developed into general ambitions for universal rule. The ancient Mesopotamians of this period believed Mesopotamia to correspond to the entire world, with its edges being the Persian Gulf ("the lower sea") and the Mediterranean Sea ("the upper sea"). Since Sumerian cities had been built over a large area (cities such as Susa, Mari and Assur were located near the perceived corners of the world) it seemed possible to reach the edges of the world.

In the Early Dynastic IIIb period (c. 2450–2350 BC), rulers attempting to reach universal dominion became more common. Two prominent examples are known from this time. The first, Lugal-Anne-Mundu, king of Adab, is claimed by the Sumerian King List (though this is a much later inscription, making his claimed expansion doubtful) to have created a great empire covering the entirety of Mesopotamia, reaching from modern Syria to Iran, "subjugating the Four Corners". The second, Lugal-zage-si, king of Uruk, conquered the entirety of Lower Mesopotamia and claimed (despite this not being the case) that his domain extended from the upper to the lower sea. Lugal-zage-si was originally titled as simply "King of Uruk" and adopted the title "King of the Land" (Sumerian: lugal-kalam-ma) to claim to universal rule. This title had also been employed by some earlier Sumerian kings claiming control over all of Sumer, such as Enshakushanna of Uruk.

The kingship over the city of Kish was recognized as particularly prestigious in early Mesopotamia. According to the Sumerian King List, Kish was where the kingship was lowered to from heaven after the flood, its rulers becoming the embodiment of human kingship. The city was seen as having some sort of primacy over other cities, gradually transitioning into a somewhat universal title in the Early Dynastic IIIb period. By the time of Sargon of Akkad (c. 2334–2279 BC), "King of Kish" meant a divinely authorized ruler with the right to rule over all of Sumer. Use of the title was not limited to rulers who held the actual city itself. "King of Kish" further implied that the ruler was a builder of cities, victorious in war, and a righteous judge.

=== History ===
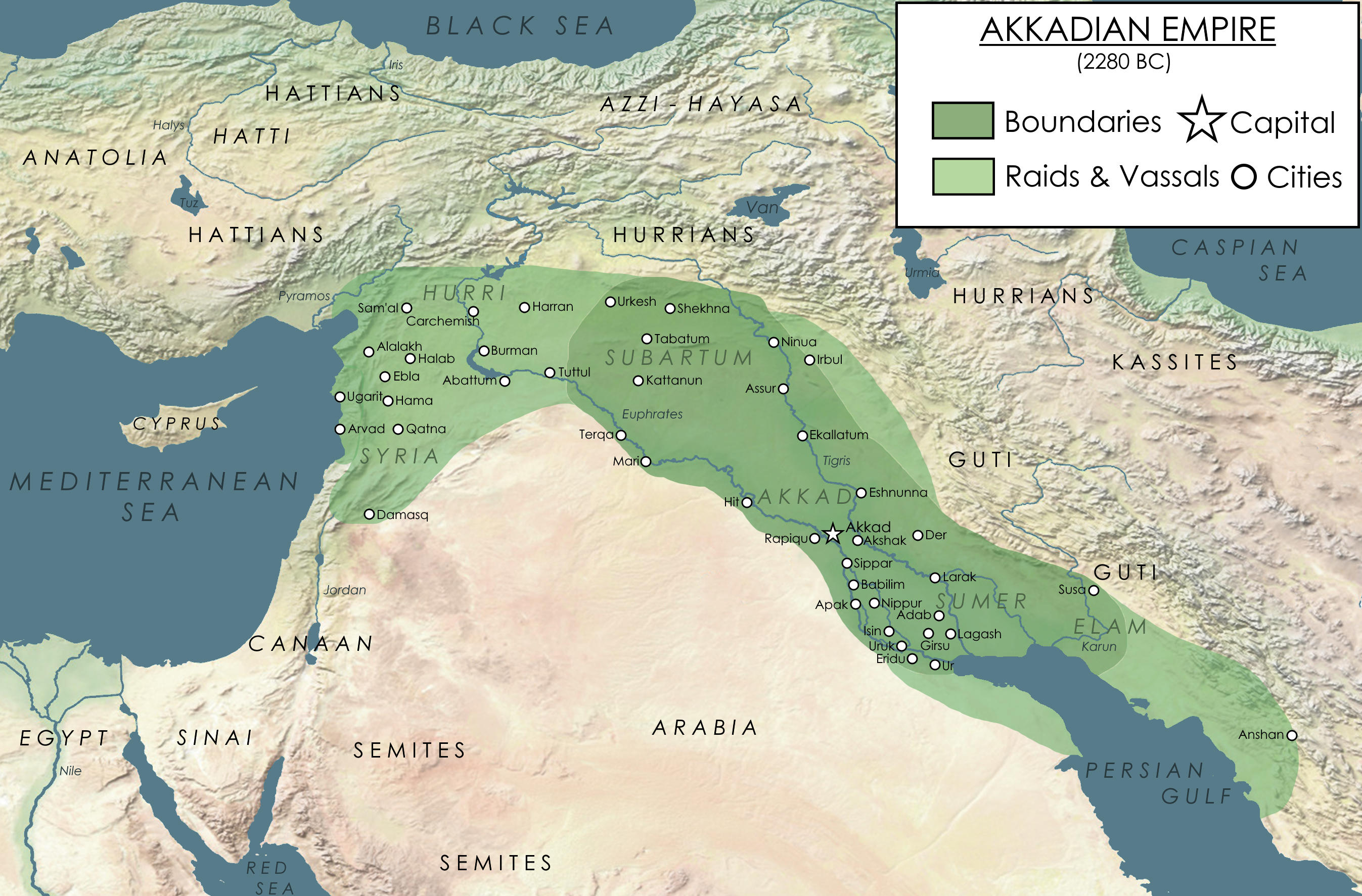
The Akkadian Empire under Sargon of Akkad

Sargon of Akkad began his political career as a cupbearer of Ur-Zababa, the ruler of Kish. After escaping assassination, Sargon usurped power in Kish and waged several wars of expansion, establishing the first great Mesopotamian empire, the Akkadian Empire (named after Sargon's second capital, Akkad). Sargon's primary title was King of Akkad (Sumerian: lugal ag-ga-dè). Sargon also adopted the new title lugal ki-sár-ra or lugal kiš-ki, though it was used more prominently under his successors. Lugal ki-sár-ra and lugal kiš-ki literally mean "King of Kish" but differ from how that title would normally be rendered in Sumerian (lugal kiš). Sargon and his successors did not directly rule Kish and did thus not claim direct kingship over the city. Under the Akkadian kings, Kish was governed by a semi-independent ruler with the title ensik. From the time of the Akkadian kings onwards, "King of Kish" should be understood as having taken on the meaning "King of the Universe". Sargon's grandson Naram-Sin (r. 2254–2218 BC) introduced the similar title King of the Four Corners of the World. This title may have referred to authority to govern the entire terrestrial realm, whereas King of the Universe was understood as referring to dominion over the cosmological realm.

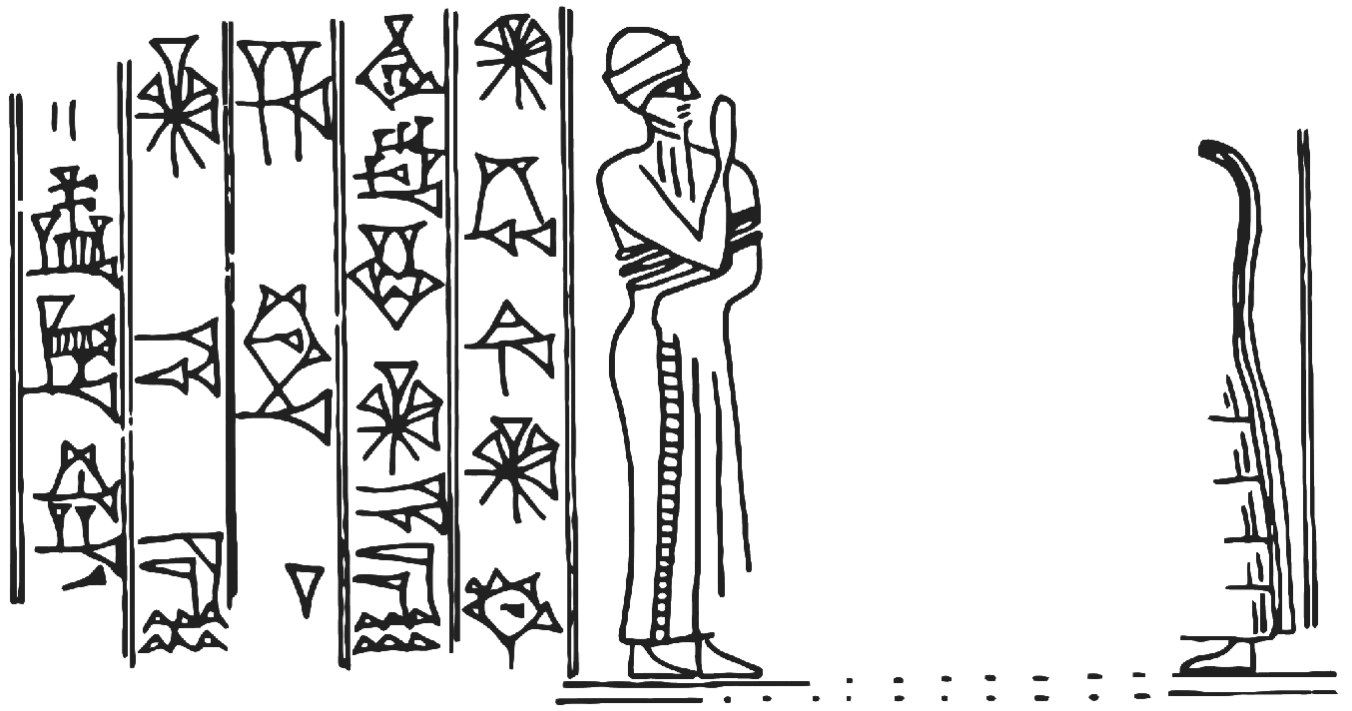
Seal of Shamshi-Adad I

King of the Universe was perhaps most prominently used by the kings of the Neo-Assyrian Empire (911–609 BC), who pursued the legacy of Sargon's empire. In the Akkadian language, the title was rendered as šar kiššatim. The title had been used sporadically by earlier rulers over the region of Assyria, such as Shamshi-Adad I (r. 1809–1776 BC) of the Kingdom of Upper Mesopotamia in the Old Babylonian period and Ashur-uballit I (r. 1353–1318 BC) in the Middle Assyrian period. Shamshi-Adad was in particular involved in a struggle with the kings of the city-state Eshnunna, who used the title "mighty king" (šarum dannum). The Eshnunnan rulers Ipiq-Adad II and Dadusha adopted "King of the Universe", signifying a struggle with the Assyrians. The title was also claimed by some kings of Babylon and Mari. Even in the Neo-Assyrian period when Assyria was the dominant realm in Mesopotamia, Assyrian use of King of the Universe was challenged by the kings of Urartu from Sarduri I (r. 834–828 BC) onwards. Sarduri and his heirs began to use the title as well, claiming to be equal to the Assyrian kings and asserting wide territorial rights.

King of the Universe is not attested for all Neo-Assyrian kings and is in some cases attested only several years into their reigns. It is thus possible that the title had to be earned by each king individually through some unknown process. Stephanie Dalley proposed in 1998 that it might have required seven successful military campaigns (seven being connected to totality in ancient Assyria). The title might have had similar requirements for Babylonian kings. The Babylonian ruler Ayadaragalama (c. 1500 BC) was only able to claim the title late in his reign, his earliest campaigns that established control over cities such as Kish, Ur, Lagash and Akkad apparently not being enough to justify use of the title. Both Ayadaragalama and the later Babylonian king Kurigalzu II only appear to have been able to claim to be King of the Universe after their realm extended as far as Bahrain.

The Neo-Assyrian Empire was succeeded by the Neo-Babylonian Empire (626–539 BC). The Neo-Babylonian rulers abandoned most of the Assyrian titles in their documents. The only Neo-Babylonian ruler to use King of the Universe in their own royal inscriptions was the empire's last king, Nabonidus (r. 556–539 BC). The title also appears in economic documents (i.e. not necessarily officially in use) under Nabopolassar (r. 626–605 BC) and Nebuchadnezzar II (r. 605–562 BC). After Cyrus the Great of the Achaemenid Empire conquered Babylon in 539 BC, King of the Universe was among the many Mesopotamian titles Cyrus decided to adopt. Cyrus's successors did not continue to use King of the Universe, though some other Assyrian titles saw continued usage, such as King of Kings and King of the Lands.

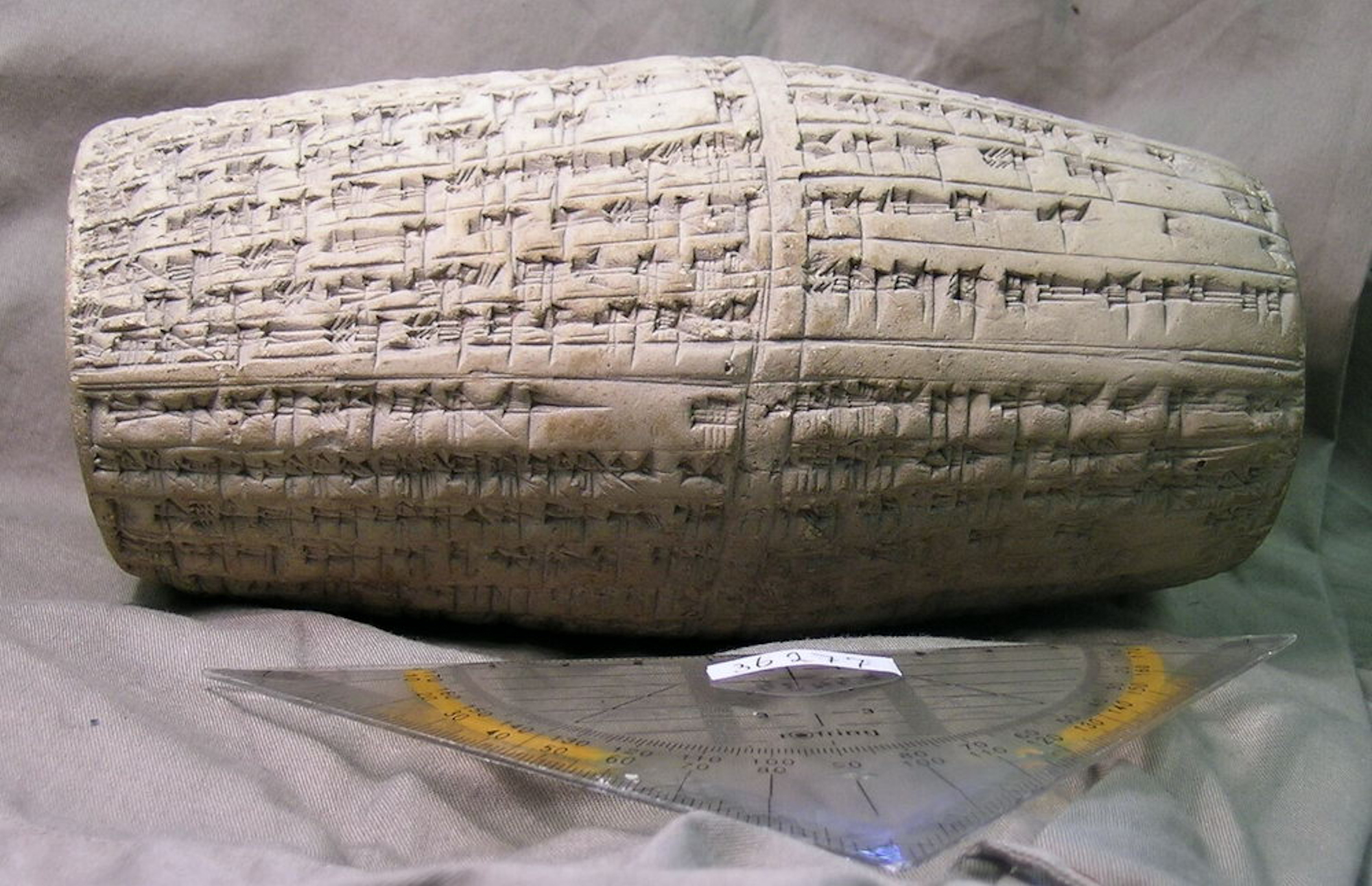
The Antiochus Cylinder of Antiochus I Soter

The last recorded use of King of the Universe was in the Seleucid Empire during the Hellenistic period. The Seleucids controlled Babylon in the wake of the conquests of Alexander the Great and the Wars of the Diadochi. "King of the Universe" appears on the Antiochus Cylinder of king Antiochus I Soter (r. 281–261 BC), which describes how Antiochus rebuilt the Ezida Temple in Borsippa. It is possible that more Achaemenid and Seleucid rulers used the title when in Mesopotamia; the Antiochus Cylinder is the last known surviving example of an Akkadian-language royal inscription. The latest known inscription preceding it is Cyrus's Cyrus Cylinder from nearly 300 years prior. The Antiochus Cylinder was likely inspired in its composition by earlier Mesopotamian royal inscriptions and bears many similarities with Assyrian and Babylonian royal inscriptions.

=== Mesopotamian religion ===
From at least the Neo-Assyrian period onwards, King of the Universe was also used as a title for at least some deities. A 680 BC inscription of the Neo-Assyrian king Esarhaddon (who in the same inscription titles himself as King of the Universe, among other titles) in Babylon refers to the goddess Sarpanit (wife of Babylon's patron deity Marduk) as Queen of the Universe.

=== Rulers who used the title ===
The record of Mesopotamian royal inscriptions is incomplete and it is therefore possible that further rulers than those listed here adopted the title.

Kings of the Universe in the Akkadian Empire

- Sargon (r. 2334–2279 BC)
- Rimush (r. 2279–2270 BC)
- Naram-Sin (r. 2254–2218 BC)

Kings of the Universe in Upper Mesopotamia

- Shamshi-Adad I (r. 1809–1776 BC)

Kings of the Universe in Eshnunna

- Dadusha (c. 1800–1779 BC)
- Naram-Sin (c. 1800 BC)
- Ipiq-Adad II (r. ~1700 BC)

Kings of the Universe in Mari

- Zimri-Lim (r. 1775–1761 BC)

Kings of the Universe in the Middle Assyrian Empire

- Ashur-uballit I (r. 1353–1318 BC)
- Adad-nirari I (r. 1295–1264 BC)
- Ashur-dan II (r. 934–912 BC)

Kings of the Universe in the Middle Babylonian period

- Ayadaragalama (r. ~1500 BC)
- Burna-Buriash II (r. 1359–1333 BC)
- Kurigalzu II (r. 1332–1308 BC)
- Nazi-Maruttash (r. 1307–1282 BC)
- Ninurta-nadin-shumi (r. 1132–1126 BC)
- Nebuchadnezzar I (r. 1126–1103 BC)
- Enlil-nadin-apli (r. 1103–1099 BC)
- Marduk-nadin-ahhe (r. 1099–1082 BC)
- Marduk-shapik-zeri (r. 1082–1069 BC)
- Adad-apla-iddina (r. 1069–1046 BC)
- Nabu-shum-libur (r. 1033–1026 BC)
- Eulmash-shakin-shumi (r. 1004–987 BC)
- Mar-biti-apla-usur (r. 984–979 BC)

Kings of the Universe in the Neo-Assyrian Empire

- Adad-nirari II (r. 912–891 BC)
- Tukulti-Ninurta II (r. 891–884 BC)
- Adad-nirari III (r. 811–783 BC)
- Tiglath-Pileser III (r. 745–727 BC)
- Shalmaneser V (r. 727–722 BC)
- Sargon II (r. 722–705 BC)
- Sennacherib (r. 705–681 BC)
- Esarhaddon (r. 681–669 BC)
- Ashurbanipal (r. 669–631 BC)
- Shamash-shum-ukin (Assyrian king of Babylon, r. 667–648 BC)
- Ashur-etil-ilani (r. 631–627 BC)
- Sinsharishkun (r. 627–612 BC)

Kings of the Universe in Urartu

- Sarduri I (r. 834–828 BC) and his successors

Kings of the Universe of the Cimmerians

- Dugdammî (r. 679-640 BC)

Kings of the Universe in the Neo-Babylonian Empire

- Nabopolassar (r. 626–605 BC), in economic documents
- Nebuchadnezzar II (r. 605–562 BC), in economic documents
- Nabonidus (r. 556–539 BC)

Kings of the Universe in the Achaemenid Empire

- Cyrus the Great (r. 559–530 BC), claimed the title from 539 BC

Kings of the Universe in the Seleucid Empire

- Antiochus I Soter (r. 281–261 BC)

== Greco-Roman tradition ==
=== Greco-Roman religion ===
The equivalent Greek term kosmōkrator (Latinized as cosmocrator) was sometimes applied to gods, rulers, and planetary bodies in ancient Greek and Roman pagan literature. Kosmōkrator has been translated as "lord of the world", "world ruler", and "ruler of the cosmos".

Several Greco-Roman deities were sometimes called kosmōkrator, including Zeus, Helios, Hermes, Serapis, and Mithras. In the Orphic Hymns, kosmōkrator is prominently applied to the nature god Pan, whose role is sometimes inflated to be a god of life and the physical world. As a moniker for Pan, kosmōkrator could have both positive and negative connotations. In late antiquity, Platonistic writers sometimes used the term very negatively for Pan since they viewed the physical universe as an imperfect and corruptible copy of the true universe of pure form and idea.

Kosmōkrator could be applied to the heavens as a whole. The most prominent use of kosmōkrator was as an astrological honorific sometimes used for the planets. In Greco-Roman astrology, the planets were seen as an organising principle in space and as objects that could exercise a fateful influence over humanity. Several ancient texts, such as the writings of Vettius Valens and Iamblichus, as well as the Greek Magical Papyri, refer to the planets as kosmokratores.

=== Honorific for rulers ===
Kosmōkrator was occasionally used for earthly rulers. The Histories of Alexander the Great, written by Quintus Curtius Rufus in the 1st century AD, frequently calls Alexander the Great kosmōkrator. The Alexander Romance likewise describes Alexander as a kosmōkrator.

From the 2nd century AD onwards, the title was sometimes used for the Roman emperor. The Greek–Nabataean Arabic Ruwafa inscriptions call Marcus Aurelius and Lucius Verus kosmokratores. A dedication to Gordian III by the Gazaeans in Rome call the emperor kosmōkrator. In the writings of Eusebius, Helena calls her son Constantine the Great by the titles basileus, mónarkhos, and kosmōkrator.

== Abrahamic tradition ==
In Jewish writings, God began to be attributed royal epithets and honorifics in the mid-3rd century AD, including the style "king of the universe" (melekh haolam). Jewish tradition had sometimes used the title for God during earlier centuries. An earlier reference is the 1st century AD writings of Josephus, wherein Josephus quotes Onias III using "king of the universe" for God in a prayer. It is possible that God being increasingly described as a king and as "king of the universe" was a reaction to the more overt monarchical rule of the Roman emperors of the 2nd and 3rd centuries AD, commonly described as kosmokratores. In a sense, God was then described as a truer world-ruler than the emperors. Jewish liturgical blessings traditionally begin with the phrase "Blessed are You, the Lord our God, who is king of the universe", a development that originated in this period.

God has likewise been referred to as "king of the universe" in Christianity. It is unclear if this developed out of Jewish tradition or in parallel. Around the end of the 1st century AD, Clement of Rome referred to God as despota epouranie basileu ton aionon ("heavenly master, king of the ages"). Around 180 AD, Theophilus of Antioch referred to God as a lord (kyrios) and as the ruler of the universe. "King of the universe" can be used as a title for both God the Father and God the Son (Jesus). Mary, mother of Jesus has sometimes been referred to as "Queen of the Universe" by Christians, for instance in a 1950 address by Pope Pius XII.

In Islam, God is likewise referred to as a universal monarch. A commonly used style is rabbi l-'alamin ("Lord of the Universe").

The Greek kosmōkrator has also sometimes been used in the Abrahamic tradition. It does not appear in the Septuagint and appears in the New Testament only once (Ephesians 6:12). Its only appearance in early Jewish literature is in the pseudepigraphical Testament of Solomon, wherein kosmokratores is used for a group of evil spirits linked to the planets. Later Rabbinic literature sometimes uses the title as a foreign word for the Angel of Death, identified with the Devil. In Ephesians 6:12, it is used for evil demons (kosmokratores tou skotous toutou, "world rulers of darkness in this world"). The 2nd-century AD bishop Irenaeus used kosmōkrator as a title of the Devil and both Origen and Ignatius of Antioch likewise referred to the Devil as the "Prince of This World". Gnostic writings have also described the Devil as a kosmōkrator.

== See also ==
- Mesopotamian cosmology
