= Universal monarchy =

Sovereign predominant over other states

A universal monarchy is a concept in which one monarchy is deemed to have sole rule over the entire world. Though a theoretical concept, many monarchs aspired to obtain large empires over vast territories.

== Overview ==
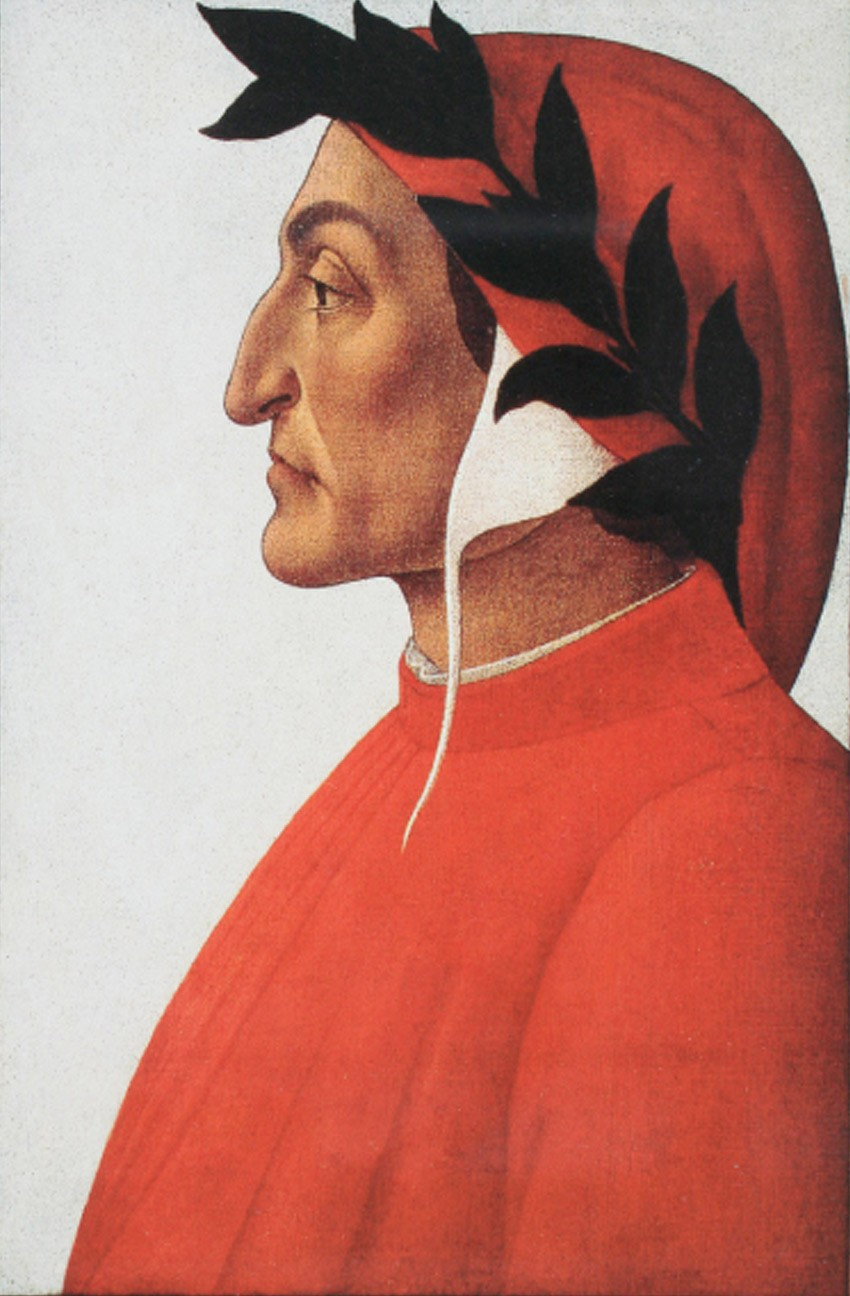
Dante Alighieri pioneered the idea of universal monarchy.

The concept of universal monarchy was pioneered by the Florentine poet Dante Alighieri, who argued that all wars and conflict would be ended if the world were ruled by a monarch that held sway over the entire world. He would expand on this idea in his political work, De Monarchia, in which he states that peace cannot exist where there is division in society. In De Monarchia he also praises the Holy Roman Empire, and promotes the monarchy as a guarantor of "universal peace". Giovanni Botero leaned positively on the idea of universal monarchy, stating that "the human bloodline would be very content" if the world lived under a "single prince", because his power would be similar to God’s.

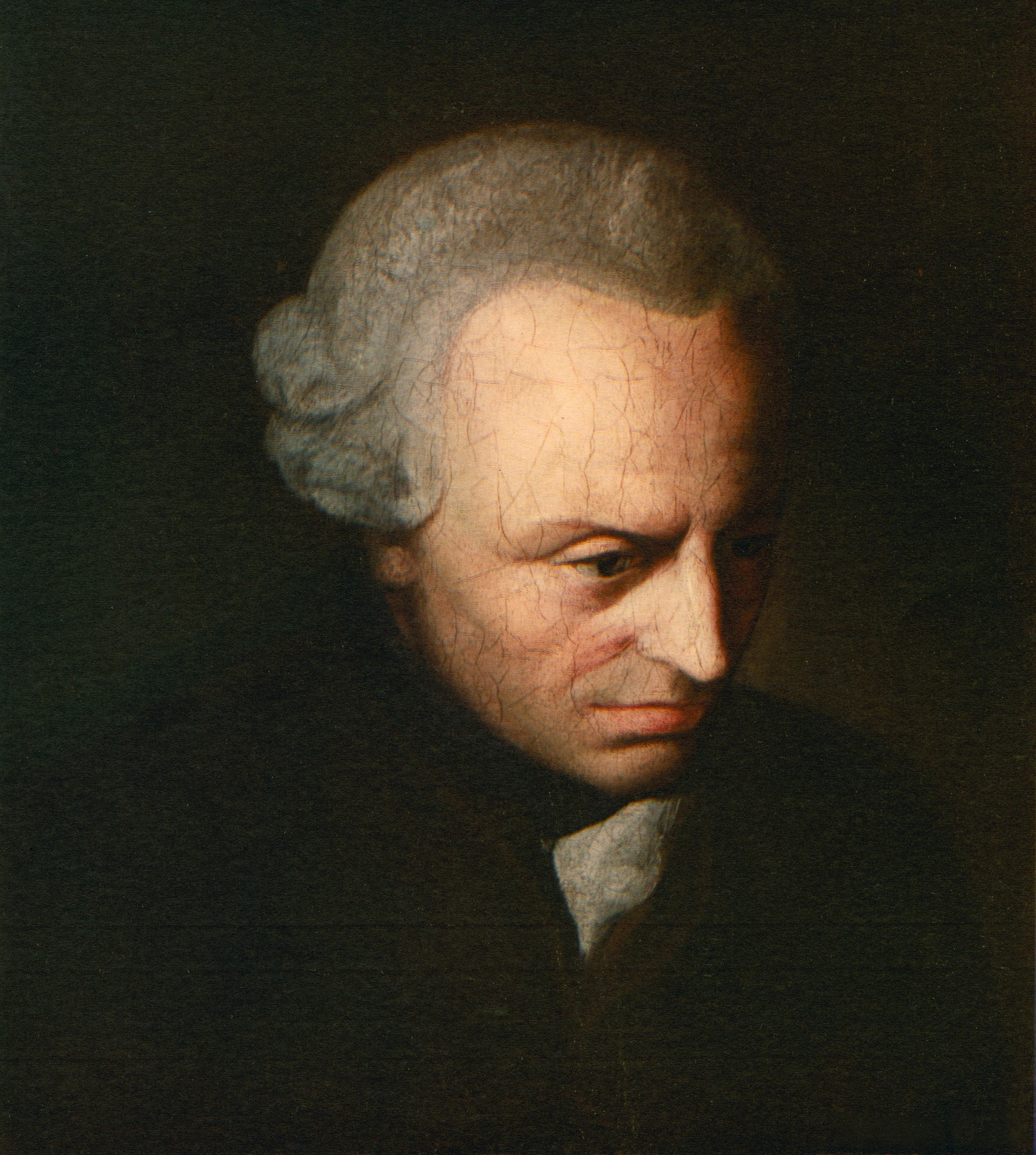
Portrait of Immanuel Kant

Immanuel Kant argued against a world monarchy on the grounds that it would be prone to tyranny. He stated that a "universal despotism" would end "in the graveyard of freedom". He instead advocated for league of independent republican states akin to the intergovernmental organizations that would emerge over a century and a half later. However, his views on a world regime were complex.

=== Politics ===
Many states have been seen as attempting to aspire to universal monarchy. In the 17th century, English commentators claimed that The Holy Roman Empire under the Habsburgs "had for a long time aspired after a Universal monarchy". Charles V, the Holy Roman Emperor and the King of Spain, was also viewed as aspiring to universal rule. Charles V's empire, encompassing much of western Europe and the Americas, has been called "the nearest the post-classical world would come to seeing a truly worldwide monarchy, and hence the closest approximation to universal imperium", though some historians view this characterization as an anachronistic evaluation of Charles V's actual motives and the realities of the political situation at the time.

The idea of a sole sovereign emperor was prominent in the West with Charlemagne and the Holy Roman Empire. The idea of the Holy Roman Empire possessing special sovereignty as a universal monarchy was respected by its surrounding powers and subject states, even while the empire was weakened by severe fragmentation. Frederick III's iconic phrase "All the world is subject to Austria" is an expression of the idea that all states are subject to one monarchy. The medieval hierocrats argued that the Pope was a universal monarch, rather than the emperor.

The idea of a universal monarchy based on predominance rather than actual total rule would later become synonymous with France attempting to establish hegemony over western Europe. Louis XIV, stylized as the "Sun King" around which all the other monarchs were subordinate satellites, exemplified the universal monarch. In 1755, during the reign of his successor Louis XV, Duke Adrien Maurice de Noailles, a member of the Council of State and formerly a key foreign policy advisor to the king, warned of a British challenge for "the first rank in Europe" through the domination of Atlantic commerce. Noailles wrote, "However chimerical the project of universal monarchy might be, that of a universal influence by means of wealth would cease to be a chimera if a nation succeeded in making itself sole mistress of the trade of America."

Napoleon was also characterized as aspiring to world monarchy. Many among Europe’s governing classes thought that Napoleon sought a form of worldwide supremacy extending beyond Europe, an impression created by France’s forceful and expansionist conduct overseas. Philip Dwyer states though that Napoleon’s actual goals remain unclear because although his occasional pronouncements stoked such anxieties, the real constraints on his policies meant that a world spanning monarchy could only be a fantasy.

== See also ==
- Dominium mundi – Pope-Emperor conflict in the Middle Ages
- Emperor at home, king abroad – System of conducting relations between states in the Chinese cultural sphere
- King of All Peoples – Title held by Mesopotamian monarchs
- King of Kings – Ruling title used by certain historical monarchs
- King of the Four Corners – Prestigious title from ancient Mesopotamia
- King of the Universe – Royal title in Ancient Mesopotamia
- Last Roman Emperor – Figure of medieval European legend
- Universal power – Either Pope or the Emperor vying for supremacy of the world
- World domination – Hypothetical world power structure
- World government – Notion of a single common political authority for all of humanity
