= King of the Lands =

Ancient Mesopotamian title

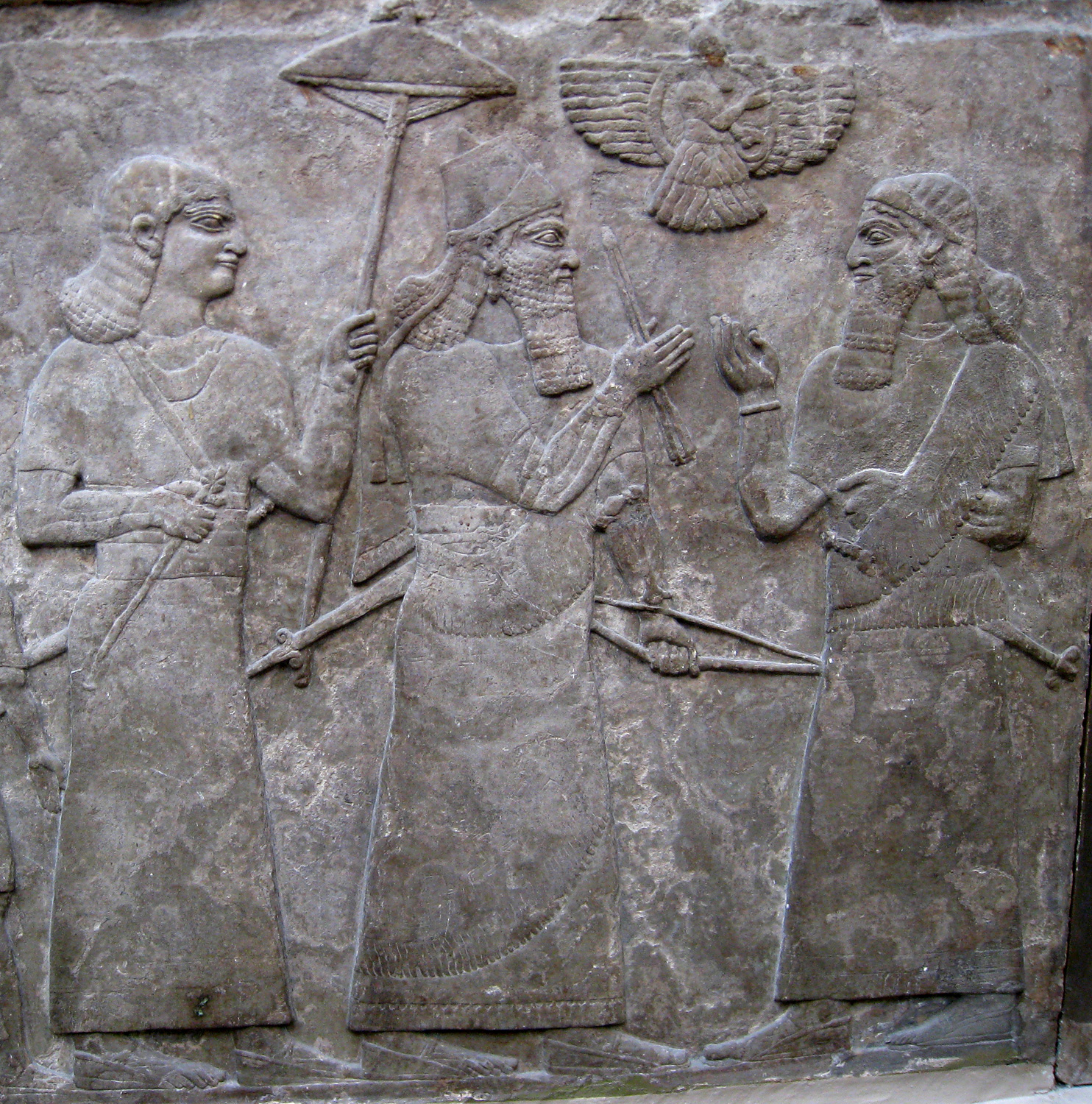
The title of King of the Lands was introduced by the Neo-Assyrian king Ashurnasirpal II (center) in the variant Glorious King of the Lands.

King of the Lands (Akkadian: šar mātāti), also interpreted as just King of Lands or the more boastful King of All Lands was a title of great prestige claimed by powerful monarchs in ancient Mesopotamia. Introduced during the Neo-Assyrian Empire (911 BC–609 BC), the term mātāti explicitly refers to foreign (e.g. non-Assyrian) lands, often beyond the confines of Mesopotamia itself (in contrast to the word mātu which refers to the Assyrian land itself), suggesting that the Assyrian king had the right to govern foreign lands as well as his own.

== History ==
The title was introduced by King Ashurnasirpal II in the variation šar mātāti šarhu, meaning "splendid" or "glorious king of lands". This title, and the similar epithet of murtedu kališ mātāte ("leader of all lands") were also used by Ashurnasirpal's son and successor Shalmaneser III. Other than these two kings, the title is rarely attested during the Neo-Assyrian period, only being used in connection to one other king, Ashurbanipal.

After his conquest of Babylon in 539 BC, Cyrus the Great assumed several traditional Mesopotamian titles, among them šar mātāti. Cyrus and all succeeding kings of the Achaemenid Empire would use the similar title of King of Countries (Old Persian: xšāyaθiya dahyūnām) in their inscriptions. Scribes in the city of Babylon translated this title into šar mātāti. Achaemenid kings who are explicitly attested with the Akkadian-language variant (when discussed by Babylonian scribes) include Cyrus the Great, Cambyses II and Artaxerxes I. The title was also assumed by rebels in Babylon during Achaemenid times. Šamaš-erība, who rebelled against the rule of Xerxes I, claimed to be the "King of Babylon and of the Lands".

Following the collapse of the Achaemenid Empire the title is only very rarely attested for some of the succeeding rulers of Mesopotamia. It occurs rarely during the Seleucid period, with king Antiochus I claiming it alongside several other traditional Mesopotamian titles in the Antiochus cylinder, which describes how Antiochus rebuilt the Ezida Temple in the city of Borsippa. It is used only once during the Parthian Empire, claimed by king Phraates II.

== List of known Kings of the Lands ==
=== Neo-Assyrian Empire ===
- Ashurnasirpal II (r. 883–859 BC)
- Shalmaneser III (r. 859–824 BC)
- Ashurbanipal (r. 669–631 BC)

=== Achaemenid Empire ===
- Cyrus the Great (r. 559–530 BC), claimed the title from 539 BC.
- Cambyses II (r. 530–522 BC)
- Artaxerxes I (r. 465–424 BC)
- All other Achaemenid kings used the equivalent title King of Countries.
- Šamaš-erība (r. 484 BC) – rebel in Babylon.

=== Seleucid Empire ===
- Antiochus I (r. 281–261 BC)

=== Parthian Empire ===
- Phraates II (r. 132–127 BC)
