= Antiochus cylinder =

250 BCE Akkadian devotional cylinder

Cylinder of Antiochus I

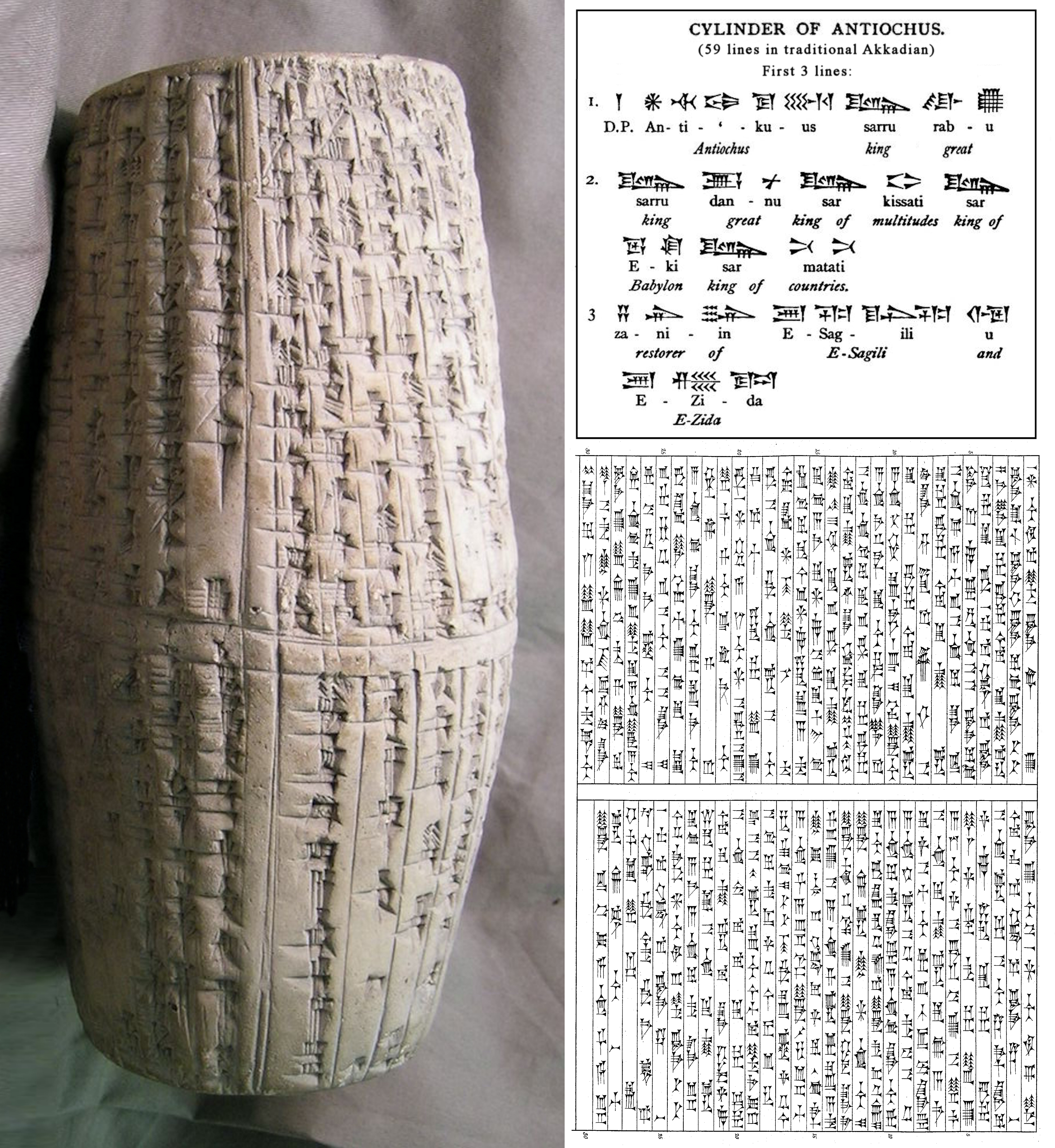
Cylinder of Antiochus I Soter, as great king of kings of Babylon, restorer of gods E-sagila and E-zida, c. 250 BCE. Written in traditional Akkadian, a voluntary archaism meant to convey prestige.

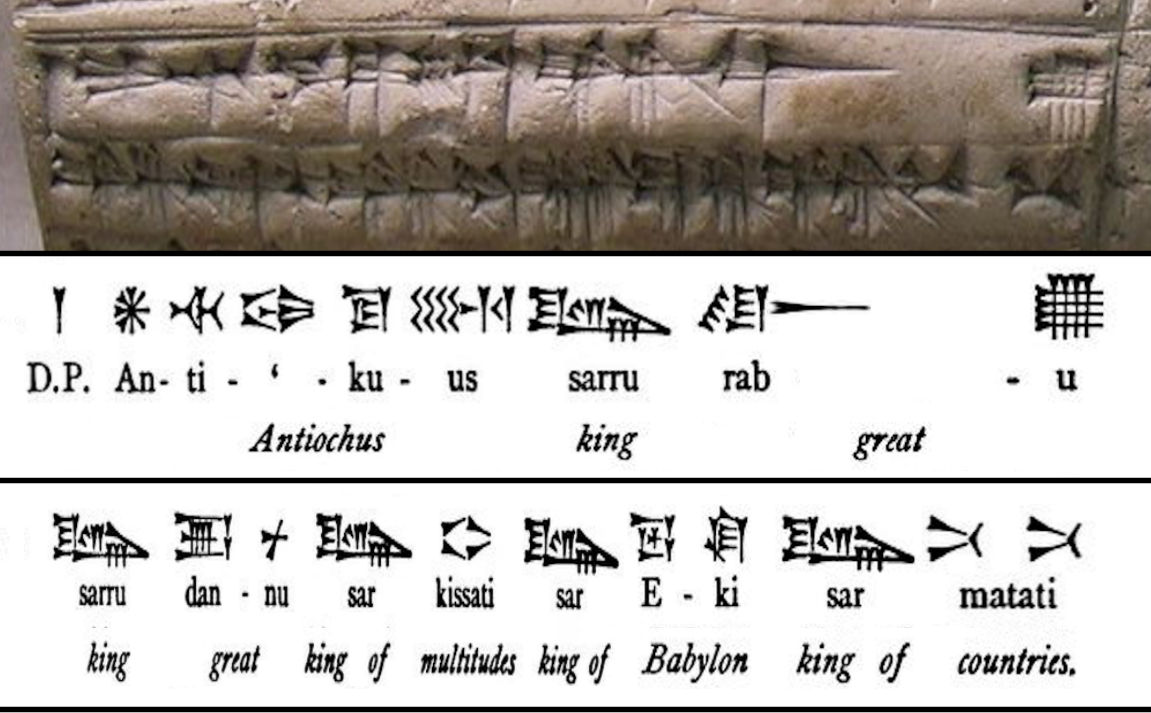
Antiochus I Soter with titles in Akkadian on the cylinder of Antiochus:
"Antiochus, King, Great King, King of multitudes, King of Babylon, King of countries"

The Antiochus cylinder is a devotional cylinder written in traditional Akkadian for Antiochus I Soter, c. 250 BCE. Discovered in Borsippa, it is now located in the British Museum (BM 36277).

The text has been translated as follows:

Antiochus, the great king, the mighty king, king of the world, king of Babylon, king of (all) countries, caretaker of Esagila and Ezida, foremost son of Seleucus, the king, the Macedonian, king of Babylon, am I.

When I desired to build Esagila and Ezida, the (first) bricks of Esagila and Ezida in the land of Hatti with my pure hand(s) I moulded with fine quality oil and for the laying of the foundation of Esagila and Ezida I transported them. In the month of Addaru, on the 20th day, of year 43, note I laid the foundation of Ezida, the true temple, the temple of Nabû, which is in Borsippa.

O Nabû, lofty son, the wise one of the gods, the proud one, who is eminently worthy of praise, firstborn son of Marduk, offspring of Erûa the queen, who creates offspring, regard me joyfully and, at your lofty command which is unchanging, may the overthrow of the country of my enemy, note the achievement of my triumphs, the predominance over the enemy through victory, kingship of justice, a reign of prosperity, years of happiness, (and) the full enjoyment of very old age be the gift for the kingship of Antiochus and king Seleucus, his son, for ever. O Son of the Prince (Marduk), Nabû, son of Esagila, first-born son of Marduk, offspring of queen Erûa:] at your entry into Ezida, the true house, the house of your Anu-ship, the dwelling of your heart's desire, with rejoicing and jubilation, may - at your true command, which cannot be annulled - my days be long, my years many, may my throne be secure, my reign long-lasting, on your sublime writing board which sets the boundary of heaven and earth.

May my good (fate) constantly be established in your pure mouth, may my hands conquer the countries from sunrise to sunset that I might inventory their tribute and bring it to make perfect Esagila and Ezida. O Nabû, foremost son, when you enter Ezida, the true house, may good (fate) for Antiochus, king of (all) countries, king Seleucus, his son, (and) Stratonice, his consort, the queen, may their good (fate), be established by your command.

— Text of the Antiochus cylinder.
