= List of state leaders in the 12th century BC =

State leaders in the 13th century BC – State leaders in the 11th century BC – State leaders by year

This is a list of state leaders in the 12th century BC (1200–1101 BC).

== Africa: Northeast ==
Egypt: New Kingdom

- Nineteenth Dynasty of the New Kingdom (complete list) –

- Amenmesses, Pharaoh (1203–1197 BC)
- Seti II, Pharaoh (1201–1198 BC)
- Siptah, Pharaoh (1197–1191 BC)
- Twosret, Queen (1191–1189 BC)

- Twentieth Dynasty of the New Kingdom (complete list) –

- Setnakhte, Pharaoh (1189–1186 BC)
- Ramesses III, Pharaoh (1186–1155 BC)
- Ramesses IV, Pharaoh (1155–1149 BC)
- Ramesses V, Pharaoh (1149–1145 BC)
- Ramesses VI, Pharaoh (1145–1137 BC)
- Ramesses VII, Pharaoh (1136–1129 BC)
- Ramesses VIII, Pharaoh (1130–1129 BC)
- Ramesses IX, Pharaoh (1129–1111 BC)
- Ramesses X, Pharaoh (1111–1107 BC)
- Ramesses XI, Pharaoh (1107–1077 BC)

== Asia ==
=== Asia: East ===
China

- Shang dynasty of China –

- Wǔ Dīng, King (1250–1192 BC)
- Zǔ Gēng, King (early 12th century BC)
- Zu Jia, King (early 12th century BC)
- Lin Xin, King (early 12th century BC)
- Geng Ding, King (c.1170–1147 BC)
- Wǔ Yǐ, King (1147–1113 BC)
- Wén Dīng, King (1112–1102 BC)
- Dì Yǐ, King (1101–1076 BC)

=== Asia: Southeast ===
Vietnam

- Hồng Bàng dynasty (complete list) –

- Ất line, (c. 1251–1162 BC)
- Bính line, (c. 1161–1055 BC)

=== Asia: West ===
- Diaokhi –

- Sien, King (c. 1120–1100 BC)

- Hittite: New Kingdom, Asia minor –

- Suppiluliuma II, Ruler (c. 1207–1178 BC, short chronology)

- Tyre, Phoenecia –

- Baal, King (c. 1193)
- Pummay, King (c. 1163–1125)

- Assyria: Middle Assyrian Period

- Tukulti-Ninurta I, King (c. 1233–1197 BC, short chronology)
- Ashur-nadin-apli, King (c. 1196–1194 BC, short chronology)
- Ashur-nirari III, King (c. 1193–1188 BC, short chronology)
- Enlil-kudurri-usur, King (c. 1187–1183 BC, short chronology)
- Ninurta-apal-Ekur, King (c. 1182–1180 BC, short chronology)
- Ashur-Dan I, King (c. 1179–1133 BC) dates are no longer subject to middle/short chronology distinctions
- Ninurta-tukulti-Ashur, King (c.1133 BC)
- Mutakkil-nusku, King (c. 1133 BC)
- Ashur-resh-ishi I, King (c. 1133–1115 BC)
- Tiglath-Pileser I, King (c. 1115–1076 BC)

- Middle Babylonian period: Kassite dynasty (complete list) –

- Adad-shuma-usur, King (c.1216–1187 BC), contemporary of Ashur-nirari III of Assyria
- Meli-Shipak II, King (c.1186–1172 BC)
- Marduk-apla-iddina I, King (c.1171–1159 BC)
- Zababa-shuma-iddin, King (c.1158 BC)
- Enlil-nadin-ahi, King (c.1157–1155 BC) Defeated by Shutruk-Nahhunte of Elam

- Middle Babylonian period: Second Dynasty of Isin (complete list) –

- Marduk-kabit-ahheshu, King (c.1155–1146 BC)
- Itti-Marduk-balatu, King (c.1146–1132 BC)
- Ninurta-nadin-shumi, King (c.1132–1126 BC)
- Nabu-kudurri-usur, King (c.1126–1103 BC)
- Enlil-nadin-apli, King (c.1103–1100 BC)

- Elam: Shutrukid dynasty (complete list) –

- Hallutush-Inshushinak, King (c. 1200 BC–?)
- Shutruk-Nahhunte I, King (c.1184–1155 BC)
- Kutir-Nahhunte II, King (1150s BC)
- Shilhak-Inshushinak I, King (c.1150–1120 BC)
- Hutelutush-Inshushinak, King (c.1120–1115 BC)
- Shilhina-Hamru-Lakamar, King (1110 BC–?)
