= Middle Eastern empires =

Regional imperial polities since antiquity

Middle East empires have existed in the Middle East region at various periods between 3000 BCE and 1924 CE; they have been instrumental in the spreading of ideas, technology, and religions within Middle East territories and to outlying territories. Since the 7th century CE, all Middle East empires, with the exception of the Byzantine Empire, were Islamic and some of them claiming the titles of an Islamic caliphate. The last major empire based in the region was the Ottoman Empire.

== 3000–2000 BCE: Ancient Middle East ==
The rich fertile lands of the Fertile Crescent gave birth to some of the oldest sedentary civilizations, including the Egyptians and Sumerians, who contributed to later societies and are credited with several important innovations, such as writing, the boats, first temples, and the wheel.

The Fertile Crescent saw the rise and fall of many great civilizations that made the region one of the most vibrant and colorful in history, including empires like that of the Assyrians and Babylonians, and influential trade kingdoms, such as the Lydians and Phoenicians.

In Anatolia, the Hittites were probably the first people to use iron weapons. In the southwest was Egypt, a land with rich resources that sustained a thriving culture.

=== First Eblaite Kingdom ===
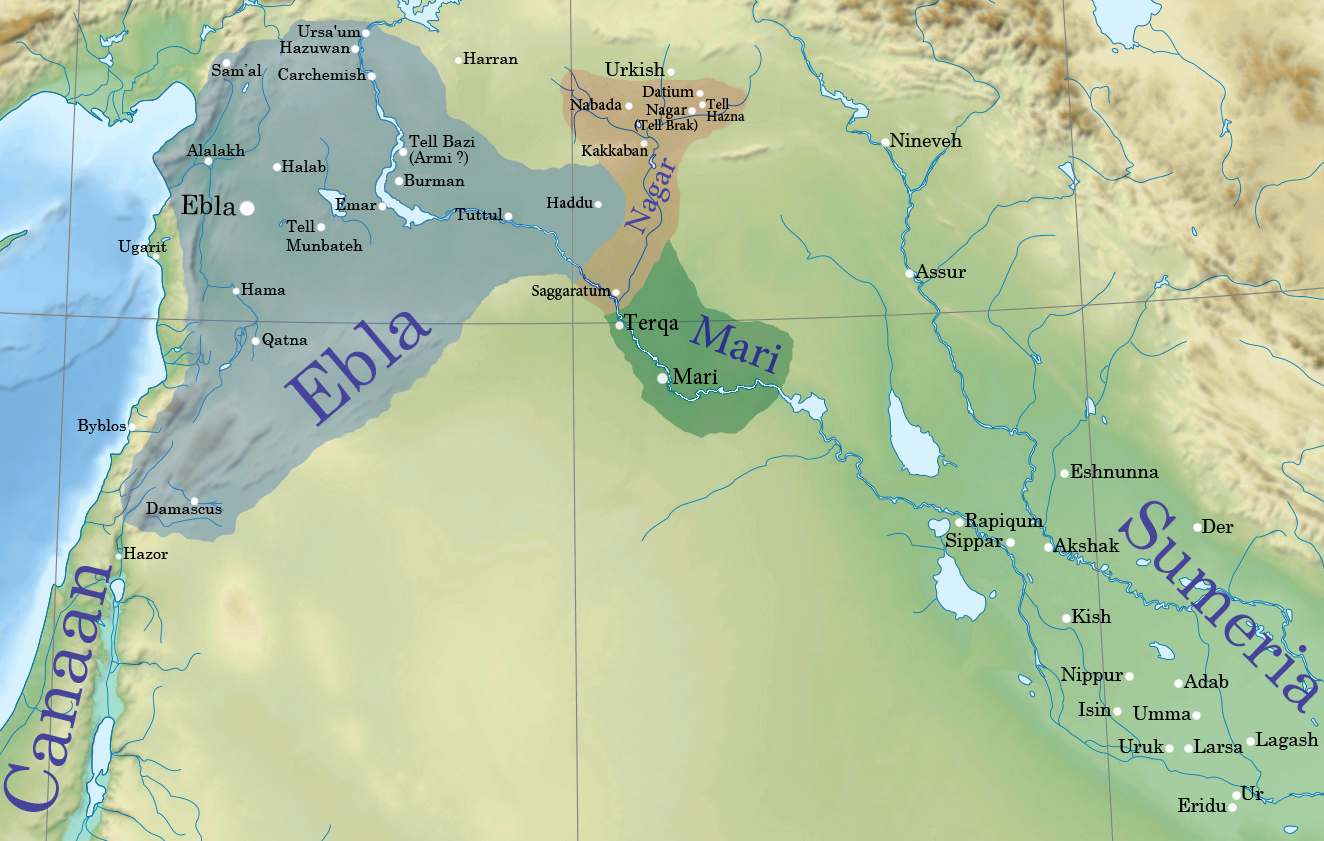
The First Eblait kingdom at its greatest territorial extent c. 2600 BCE, often described as the first great power in history

Ebla was an important center throughout the 3rd millennium BCE and in the first half of the 2nd millennium BCE. Its discovery proved the Levant was a center of ancient, centralized civilization equal to Egypt and Mesopotamia and ruled out the view that the latter two were the only important centers in the Near East during the Early Bronze Age. The first Eblaite kingdom has been described as the first recorded world power.

Starting as a small settlement in the Early Bronze Age (c. 3500 BCE), Ebla developed into a trading empire and later into an expansionist power that imposed its hegemony over much of northern and eastern Syria. Ebla was destroyed during the 23rd century BCE; it was then rebuilt and was mentioned in the records of the Third Dynasty of Ur. The second Ebla was a continuation of the first, ruled by a new royal dynasty. It was destroyed at the end of the 3rd millennium BCE, which paved the way for the Amorite tribes to settle in the city, forming the third Ebla. The third kingdom also flourished as a trade center; it became a subject and an ally of Yamhad (modern-day Aleppo) until its final destruction by the Hittite king Mursili I in c. 1600 BCE.

=== Akkadian Empire ===
Akkadian Empire and vassal cities that were subjugated by Sargon of Akkad c. 2300 BCE

The Akkadian Empire was the first ancient empire of Mesopotamia, after the long-lived civilization of Sumer. It was centered in the city of Akkad and its surrounding region. The empire united Akkadian (Assyrian and Babylonian) and Sumerian speakers under one rule. The Akkadian Empire exercised influence across Mesopotamia, the Levant, and Anatolia, sending military expeditions as far south as Dilmun and Magan (modern Bahrain and Oman) in the Arabian Peninsula.

Mesopotamian city-states, both Sumerian and East Semitic, had a legacy of intercity warfare, and the tools of these wars have been found in graves, such as copper axes and blades. The first chariot was used extensively, and the Sumerians possessed a dynamic and innovative military.

Early cavalry were employed as shock troops, needed to punch holes into the enemy lines to allow infantry to penetrate them, isolate pockets and eliminate them. They were also used to harass enemy flanks, and sometimes outflank enemies, and most armies trembled at the sight of a chariot force.

As infantry, the Sumerians used a heavy infantry phalanx, depicted on the Stele of the Vultures, which commemorates the victory over Umma by Lagash in 2525 BCE. These were very similar to the later Macedonian phalanx, although the weaponry was less advanced.

They carried spears and uncomfortable armor. Sumerian armies also made great use of skirmishers to harass an opponent. The empire's most remarkable ruler was undoubtedly Sargon the Great (of Akkad), who lived from 2334 to 2279 BCE and numbers among the first great Middle Eastern rulers, as well as a great military tactician and strategist. He is credited as the first general to use amphibious warfare in recorded history.

After some years of peace, Sargon waged wars against his rival Elam, and then launched a separate attack on Syria and Lebanon. The key to Sargon's victories was his coordination in the army movement, his ability to improvise tactics, his combined arms strategy, and his skill at siege warfare, as well as the keeping of intelligence always relying on heavy reconnaissance.

After Sargon's conquest of Sumer, the area enjoyed a relatively peaceful and prosperous era – perhaps its golden age. International trade flourished as the merchants went from Sumer to the expanses of the east, and also to the vast resources of the west. Goods from Egypt, Anatolia, Iran and elsewhere flowed into Sargon's gargantuan kingdom. Sargon's legacy was one of trade and one of forming the standing army, which later rulers would use offensively.

When Sargon died, Rimush, his son, inherited the empire. However, he was plagued by constant uprisings. After his death, his brother took the throne. He too was plagued by constant rebellions and was later usurped by Naram-Sin. Naram-Sin quickly destroyed and dispersed the Sumerian rebels and also went on a vast campaign of conquest, taking his armies to Lebanon, Syria and Israel, and then to Egypt. However, after Naram-Sin, the dynasty went into decline and soon fell altogether.

=== Third Dynasty of Ur ===
Neo-Sumerian Empire territory under the Third Dynasty of Ur c. 2100 BCE

The Third Dynasty of Ur, also called the Neo-Sumerian Empire, refers to a 22nd to 21st century BCE (middle chronology) ruling dynasty based in the city of Ur and a short-lived territorial-political state in Mesopotamia which some historians consider to have been a nascent empire. The Third Dynasty of Ur is commonly abbreviated as Ur III by historians studying the period. It is numbered in reference to previous dynasties, as they appeared in some of the better-preserved editions of the Sumerian King List, although it seems the once supposed Second Dynasty of Ur never existed. It began after several centuries of control by Akkadian and Gutian kings. It controlled the cities of Isin, Larsa, and Eshnunna and extended as far north as Upper Mesopotamia.

== 1800–1200 BCE: the Babylonian, Mitanni, Egyptian, and Hittite Empires ==
=== Babylonian Empire ===
Babylonian territory during Hammurabi's reign

The city of Babylon makes its second to the last appearance in historical sources after the fall of the Third Dynasty of Ur, which had ruled the city-states of the alluvial plain between the rivers Euphrates and Tigris for more than a century. An agricultural crisis meant the end of this centralized state and several more or less nomadic tribes settled in southern Mesopotamia. One of these was the nation of the Amorites ("westerners"), which took over Isin, Larsa, and Babylon. Their kings are known as the First Dynasty of Babylon.

The area was reunited by Hammurabi, a king of Babylon of Amorite descent. From his reign on, the alluvial plain of southern Iraq was called, with a deliberate archaism, Mât Akkadî, "the country of Akkad", after the city that had united the region centuries before, but it is known to us as Babylonia. It was one of the most fertile and rich parts of the ancient world.

Babylon and its ally Larsa fought a defensive war against Elam, the archenemy of Akkad. After this war had been brought to a successful end, Hammurabi turned against Larsa and defeated its king Rim-Sin. This scenario was repeated: together with the king Zimri-Lim of Mari, Hammurabi waged war against Aššur, and after success had been achieved, the Babylonians attacked their ally and Mari was sacked. Other wars were fought against Yamhad (Aleppo), Elam, Eshnunna, and the mountain tribes in the Zagros. Babylon was the capital of the entire region between Harran in the northwest and the Persian Gulf in the southeast.

Hammurabi's successes became the problems of his successors. After the annexation of Mari in the northwest and Ešnunna in the east, there was no buffer against the increasing power of the Hittite Empire and the Kassite tribes in the Zagros. It was impossible for the successors of Hammurabi to fight against all these enemies at the same time, and they started to lose their grip. These enemies sometimes invaded Babylonia, and in 1595 BCE the Hittite king Mursilis I advanced along the Euphrates, sacked Babylon, and even took away the statue of the supreme god of Babylonia, Marduk, from its temple, the Esagila.

With the fall of the Assyrian empire (612 BCE), the Babylonian Empire was the most powerful state in the ancient world. Even after the Babylonian Empire had been overthrown by the Persian king Cyrus the Great (539), the city itself remained an important cultural center and the ultimate prize in the eyes of aspiring conquerors.

=== Mitanni ===
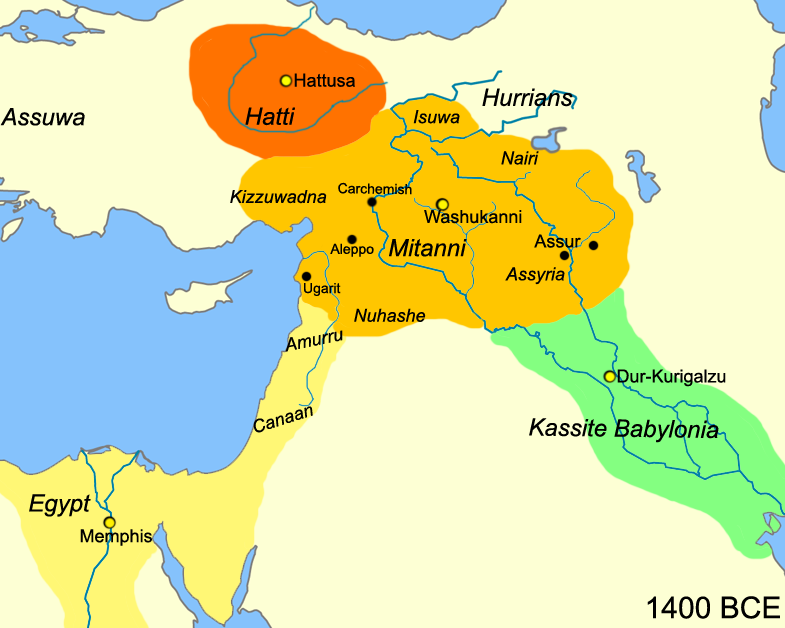
Kingdom of Mitanni at its greatest extent c. 1400 BCE

Mitanni was the most powerful Hurrian-speaking kingdom in the region. It came to dominate northern Syria, northern Mesopotamia and southeast Anatolia. Shaushtatar, king of Mitanni, sacked the Assyrian capital of Assur some time in the 15th century during the reign of Nur-ili, and took the silver and golden doors of the royal palace to Washukanni. This is known from a later Hittite document, the Suppililiuma-Shattiwaza treaty. After the sack of Assur, Assyria may have paid tribute to Mitanni up to the time of Eriba-Adad I (1390–1366 BCE).

The Mitanni kingdom would go on to fight full-scale wars, and occasionally form alliances, with the Egyptians, Assyrians and Hittites. The Hittites would ultimately destroy the kingdom after conquering its capital.

=== Egyptian Empire ===
New Kingdom of Egypt at its greatest territorial extent incorporating Canaan and Syria c. 1450 BCE

From 1560 to 1080 BCE, the Egyptian Empire reached its zenith as the dominant power in the Middle East. When Rome was still a marsh and the Acropolis was an empty rock, Egypt was already one thousand years old. Although the period of the pyramid-builders was long over, Egypt lay on the threshold of its greatest age. The New Kingdom would be an empire forged by conquest, maintained by intimidation and diplomacy, and remembered long after its demise.

By 1400 BCE, the Egyptian Empire stretched from northern Syria to the Sudan in Africa, under the rule of Amenhotep III. It was a golden age of wealth, power, and prosperity, and remarkable diplomacy was used to keep the empire's rivals at bay. Art, technology and new ideas flourished and Egyptian rulers were seen as gods.

The peak of Egyptian imperial expansion came when threatened from abroad, when Ramesses II led an army to the north to fight the Hittites at Kadesh. The battle was his crowning achievement and the basis for a new period of stability and wealth. Resources flooded into Egypt. However, foreign powers once again threatened it, and some provinces wavered in their allegiance.

After the long reign of Ramesses II, the great tombs were systematically looted and a civil war ensued. Though Egypt was once again divided, carved up among foreign powers, the period left a rich legacy.

=== Hittite Empire ===
Map of the Hittite Empire at its greatest extent, with Hittite rule ca. 1350–1300 BCE represented by the green line.

The Hittite empire is often confused with that of the Chaldean/Babylonians and Greek historians of the period rarely mention it.

The Egyptian documents that mention the eponymous Hatti region of the Hittites are the war annals of Thutmoses III and of Seti and Ramses II. The El Amarna letters, written in cuneiform, refer frequently to Hatti. This period in the conventional chronology covers the time from about 1500 to1250 BCE. Merneptah, who followed Ramses II, said that Hatti was pacified. Ramses III, supposedly of about 1200–1180 BCE, wrote that Hatti was already crushed or wasted.

A Babylonian chronicle mentions the Hatti in connection with an invasion of Babylon at the close of the ancient dynasty of Hammurabi, supposedly in the 17th or 16th centuries.

== 1200 BCE – 1100 BCE: Elamite Empire ==
=== Elamite Empire ===
Elamite Empire at its greatest extent, c. 1170 BCE under Shutruk-Nakhunte

Under the Shutrukids (c. 1210 – 1100 BCE), the Elamite empire reached the height of its power. Shutruk-Nakhkhunte and his three sons, Kutir-Nakhkhunte II, Shilhak-In-Shushinak, and Khutelutush-In-Shushinak were capable of frequent military campaigns into Kassite Babylonia (which was also being ravaged by the empire of Assyria during this period), and at the same time were exhibiting vigorous construction activity—building and restoring luxurious temples in Susa and across their Empire. Shutruk-Nakhkhunte raided Babylonia, carrying home to Susa trophies like the statues of Marduk and Manishtushu, the Manishtushu Obelisk, the Stele of Hammurabi and the stele of Naram-Sin. In 1158 BCE, after much of Babylonia had been annexed by Ashur-Dan I of Assyria and Shutruk-Nakhkhunte, the Elamites defeated the Kassites permanently, killing the Kassite king of Babylon, Zababa-shuma-iddin, and replacing him with his eldest son, Kutir-Nakhkhunte, who held it no more than three years before being ejected by the native Akkadian speaking Babylonians. The Elamites then briefly came into conflict with Assyria, managing to take the Assyrian city of Arrapḫa (modern Kirkuk) before being ultimately defeated and having a treaty forced upon them by Ashur-Dan I.

Kutir-Nakhkhunte's son Khutelutush-In-Shushinak was probably of an incestuous relation of Kutir-Nakhkhunte's with his own daughter, Nakhkhunte-utu. He was defeated by Nebuchadnezzar I of Babylon, who sacked Susa and returned the statue of Marduk, but who was then himself defeated by the Assyrian king Ashur-resh-ishi I. He fled to Anshan, but later returned to Susa, and his brother Shilhana-Hamru-Lagamar may have succeeded him as last king of the Shutrukid dynasty. Following Khutelutush-In-Shushinak, the power of the Elamite empire began to wane seriously, for after the death of this ruler, Elam disappears into obscurity for more than three centuries.

== 1000 BCE – 550 BCE: the Neo-Assyrian, Phoenician, Median, Chaldean and Lydian Empires ==
=== Neo-Assyrian Empire ===
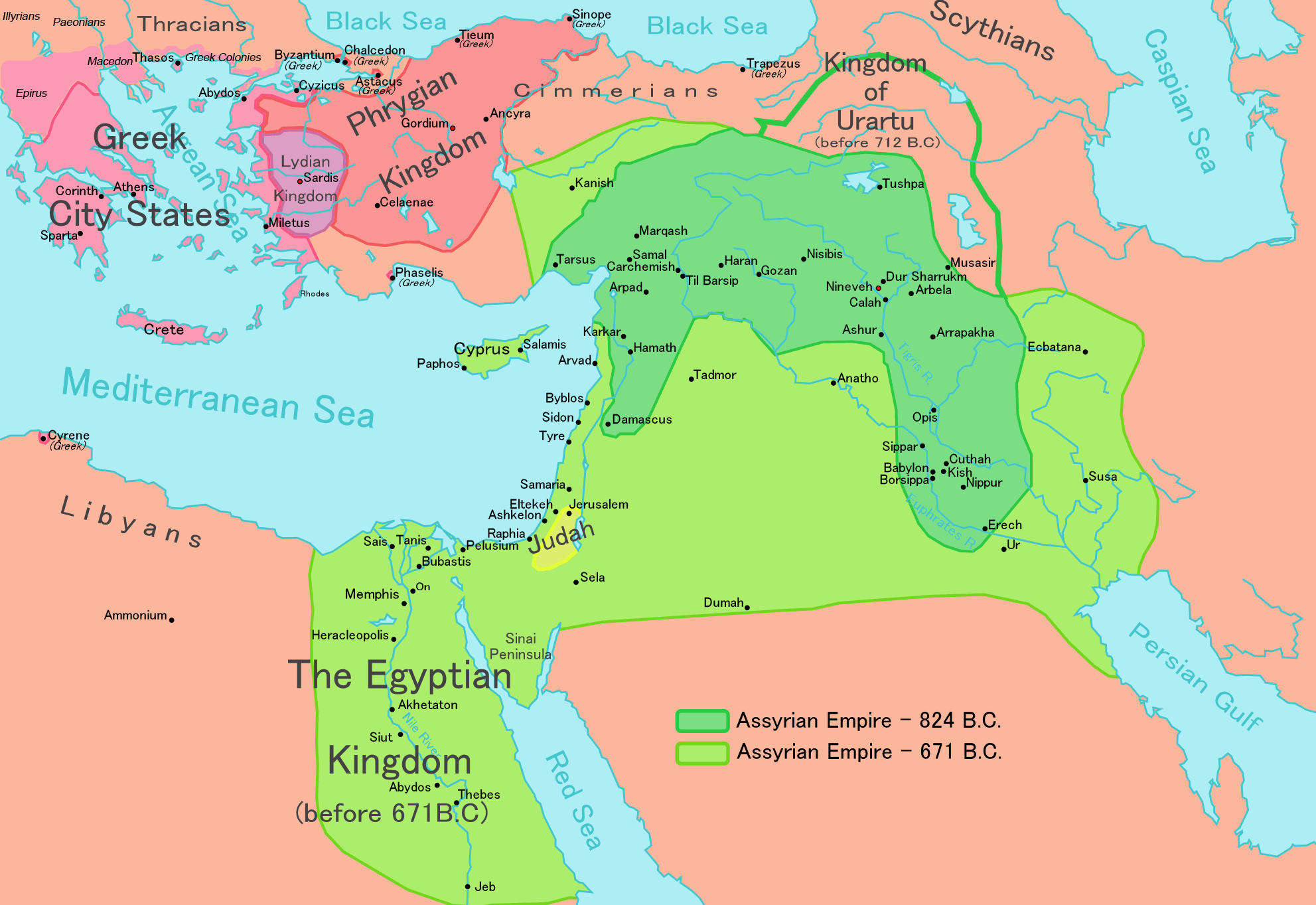
Neo-Assyrian Empire in its greatest extent light green c. 671 BCE under Esarhaddon

Following the conquests of Adad-nirari II in the late 10th century BCE, Assyria emerged as the most powerful state in the world at the time, coming to dominate the Ancient Near East, East Mediterranean, Asia Minor, Caucasus, and parts of the Arabian Peninsula and North Africa, eclipsing and conquering rivals such as Babylonia, Elam, Persia, Urartu, Lydia, the Medes, Phrygians, Cimmerians, Israel, Judah, Phoenicia, Chaldea, Canaan, the Kushite Empire, the Arabs, and Egypt.

The Neo-Assyrian Empire succeeded the Middle Assyrian Empire (1365–934 BCE) of the Late Bronze Age. During this period, Aramaic was also made an official language of the empire, alongside Akkadian. The Assyrian army is said to have included as high as 300,000 soldiers at its prime.

=== Phoenician Maritime Empire ===
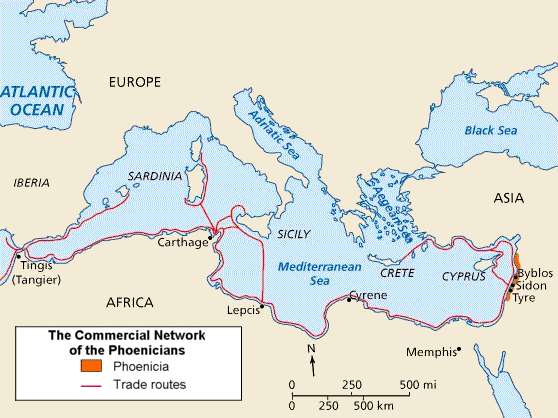
Map of Phoenicia and its Mediterranean trade routes and colonies

The Phoenicians were the first the peoples to establish a maritime empire with colonies as far as the extremities North Africa and Iberia. To facilitate their commercial ventures, the Phoenicians established numerous colonies and trading posts along the coasts of the Mediterranean. Phoenician city states generally lacked the numbers or even the desire to expand their territory overseas. Few colonies had more than 1,000 inhabitants; only Carthage and some nearby settlements in the western Mediterranean would grow larger. A major motivating factor was competition with the Greeks, who began expanding across the Mediterranean during the same period. Though a largely peaceful rivalry, their respective settlements in Crete and Sicily did clash intermittently.

The earliest Phoenician settlements outside the Levant were on Cyprus and Crete, gradually moving westward towards Corsica, the Balearic Islands, Sardinia, and Sicily, as well as on the European mainland in Genoa and Marseilles. The first Phoenician colonies in the western Mediterranean were along the northwest African coast and on Sicily, Sardinia and the Balearic Islands. Tyre led the way in settling or controlling coastal areas.

One of the earliest Phoenician inscriptions is the Nora Stone found on the south coast of Sardinia in 1773, it is dated to the 9th century BCE (c. 825-780 BCE). The inscription is most likely understood to be about a battle in which the forces of Pygmalion of Tyre (Pumayyaton) participated in at Tarshish:

| Line | Transliteration | Translation (Peckham) | Translation (Cross) |
| a. | | He fought (?) | |
| b. | | with the Sardinians (?) | |
| 1 | btršš | From Tarshish | at Tarshish |
| 2 | wgrš hʾ | he was driven; | and he drove them out. |
| 3 | bšrdn š | in Sardinia he | Among the Sardinians |
| 4 | lm hʾ šl | found refuge, | he is [now] at peace, |
| 5 | m ṣbʾ m | his forces found refuge; | (and) his army is at peace: |
| 6 | lktn bn | Milkuton, son of | Milkaton son of |
| 7 | šbn ngd | Shubon the commander. | Shubna (Shebna), general |
| 8 | lpmy | To (god) Pmy. | of (king) Pummay. |

In this rendering, Frank Moore Cross has restored the missing top of the tablet (estimated at two lines) based on the content of the rest of the inscription, as referring to a battle that has been fought and won. Alternatively, "the text honours a god, most probably in thanks for the traveller's safe arrival after a storm", observes Robin Lane Fox.

According to Cross the stone has been erected by a general, Milkaton, son of Shubna, victor against the Sardinians at the site of TRSS, surely Tarshish. Cross conjectures that Tarshish here "is most easily understood as the name of a refinery town in Sardinia, presumably Nora or an ancient site nearby." Cross's interpretation of the Nora Stone provides additional evidence that in the late 9th century BCE, Tyre was involved in colonizing the western Mediterranean, lending credence to the establishment of a colony in Carthage in that time frame.

Phoenician colonies were fairly autonomous. At most, they were expected to send annual tribute to their mother city, usually in the context of a religious offering. However, in the seventh century BCE the western colonies came under the control of Carthage, which was exercised directly through appointed magistrates. Carthage continued to send annual tribute to Tyre for some time after its independence.

=== Median Empire ===
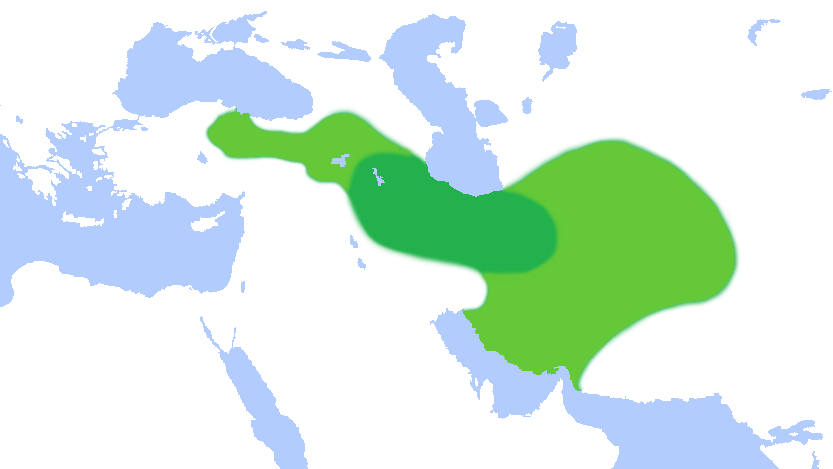
Median Empire at its greatest extent (6th century BCE) according to Herodotus

The Median empire was the first Iranian dynasty corresponding to the northeastern section of present-day Iran, Northern-Khvarvarana and Asuristan, and South and Eastern Anatolia. The inhabitants, who were known as Medes, and their neighbors, the Persians, spoke Median languages that were closely related to Aryan (Old Persian). Historians know very little about the Iranian culture under the Median dynasty, except that Zoroastrianism, as well as a polytheistic religion, was practiced, and a priestly caste called the Magi existed.

Traditionally, the creator of the Median kingdom was one Deioces who, according to Herodotus, reigned from 728 to 675 BCE and founded the Median capital Ecbatana(Hâgmatâna or modern Hamadan). Attempts have been made to associate Daiaukku, a local Zagros king mentioned in a cuneiform text as one of the captives deported to Assyria by Sargon II in 714 BCE, with the Deioces of Herodotus, but such an association is highly unlikely. To judge from the Assyrian sources, no Median kingdom such as Herodotus describes for the reign of Deioces existed in the early 7th century BCE; at best, he is reporting a Median legend of the founding of their kingdom.

The Medes gained control over the lands in eastern Anatolia that had once been part of Urartu and eventually became embroiled in a war with the Lydians, the dominant political power in western Asia Minor. In 585 BCE, probably through the mediation of the Babylonians, peace was established between Media and Lydia, and the Halys (Kizil) River was fixed as the boundary between the two kingdoms. Thus, a new balance of power was established in the Middle East among Medes, Lydians, Babylonians, and, far to the south, Egyptians.

At his death, Cyaxares controlled vast territories: all of Anatolia to the Halys, the whole of western Iran eastward, perhaps as far as the area of modern Tehran, and all of south-western Iran, including Fars. Whether it is appropriate to call these holdings or not, a kingdom is debatable; one suspects that authority over the various peoples, Iranian and non-Iranian, who occupied these territories, was exerted in the form of a confederation, such as it is implied by the ancient Iranian royal title, king of kings.

Astyages followed his father, Cyaxares, on the Median throne (585–550 BCE). Comparatively, little is known of his reign. Nothing was well with the alliance with Babylon, and there is some evidence to suggest that Babylonia may have feared Median power. The latter, however, was soon in no position to threaten others, for Astyages was himself under attack. Indeed, Astyages and the Medians were soon overthrown by the rise to power in the Iranian world of Cyrus II the Great.

=== Chaldean Empire ===
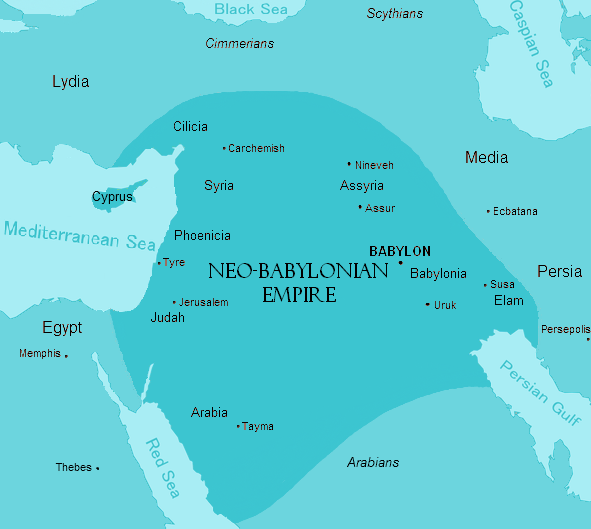
Neo-Babylonian (Chaldean) Empire at its greatest extent

While the Median kingdom controlled the highland region, the Chaldeans, with their capital at Babylon, were masters of the Fertile Crescent. Nebuchadnezzar, becoming king of the Chaldeans in 604 BCE, raised Babylonia to another epoch of brilliance after more than a thousand years of the eclipse. By defeating the Egyptians in Syria, Nebuchadnezzar ended their hopes of re-creating their empire. He destroyed Jerusalem in 586 BCE and carried thousands of Jews captive to Babylonia.

Nebuchadnezzar reconstructed Babylon, making it the largest and most impressive city of its day. The tremendous city walls were wide enough at the top to have rows of small houses on either side. In the center of Babylon ran the famous Procession Street, which passed through the Ishtar Gate. This arch, which was adorned with brilliant tile animals, is the best remaining example of Babylonian architecture.

The immense palace of Nebuchadnezzar towered terrace upon terrace, each resplendent with masses of ferns, flowers, and trees. These roof gardens, the famous Hanging Gardens of Babylon, were regarded by the Greeks as one of the seven wonders of the world.

Nebuchadnezzar also rebuilt the great temple-tower or ziggurat, the Biblical "Tower of Babel," which the Greek historian Herodotus viewed a century later and described as a tower of solid masonry, a 220 yards in length and breadth, upon which was raised a second tower, and on that a third, and so on up to eight. Nebuchadnezzar was the last great Mesopotamian ruler, and Chaldean power quickly crumbled after his death in 562 BCE.

The Chaldean priests, whose interest in astrology so greatly added to the fund of Babylonian astronomical knowledge that the word "Chaldean" came to mean astronomer, continually undermined the monarchy. Finally, in 539 BCE, they opened the gates of Babylon to Cyrus the Persian, thus fulfilling Daniel's message of doom upon the notorious Belshazzar, the last Chaldean ruler: "You have been weighed in the balances and found wanting" (Dan. 5:27).

=== Lydian Empire ===
Map of the Lydian Empire under Croesus c. 547 BCE. (Borders are in red)

The Kingdom of Lydia entered the historical record in 660 BCE, when the Assyrian king Ashurbanipal demanded tribute from the Lydian king, "Gyges of Luddi." The grandson of Gyges, Alyattes, built the Lydian Empire during his fifty-seven-year reign.

Alyattes captured Smyrna, the greatest port of the Asian coast, and one-by-one added Greek coastal towns to his domain. Although he let the Greek cities retain their customs and institutions, and their taxes, along with Lydian gold, he made Lydian monarchs the richest kings since Solomon.

Croesus was the son and heir of Alyattes and the most important Lydian king concerning the Bible. He was fabulously wealthy, spawning the simile: "as rich as Croesus."

The undoing of Croesus and the Lydian empire came when they attacked Cyrus the Great. Victorious over Cappadocians, Croesus was filled with confidence. The benevolent Cyrus offered Croesus his throne and kingdom if the latter would recognize Persian sovereignty. Croesus replied saying that the Persians would be slaves of the Lydians. Therefor, Cyrus immediately attacked Croesus.

After two indecisive engagements, Croesus was driven from the field of battle. He begged for Egypt, Greece, or Babylon to help him, but his pleas fell on deaf ears. The Lydian capital of Sardis fell and Croesus was taken as a prisoner.

Though, as was his custom, Cyrus dealt kindly with Croesus, the once very wealthy Lydian empire became a Persian satrapy called Saparda (Sardis).

== 550 BCE – 330 BCE: the Persian Empire ==
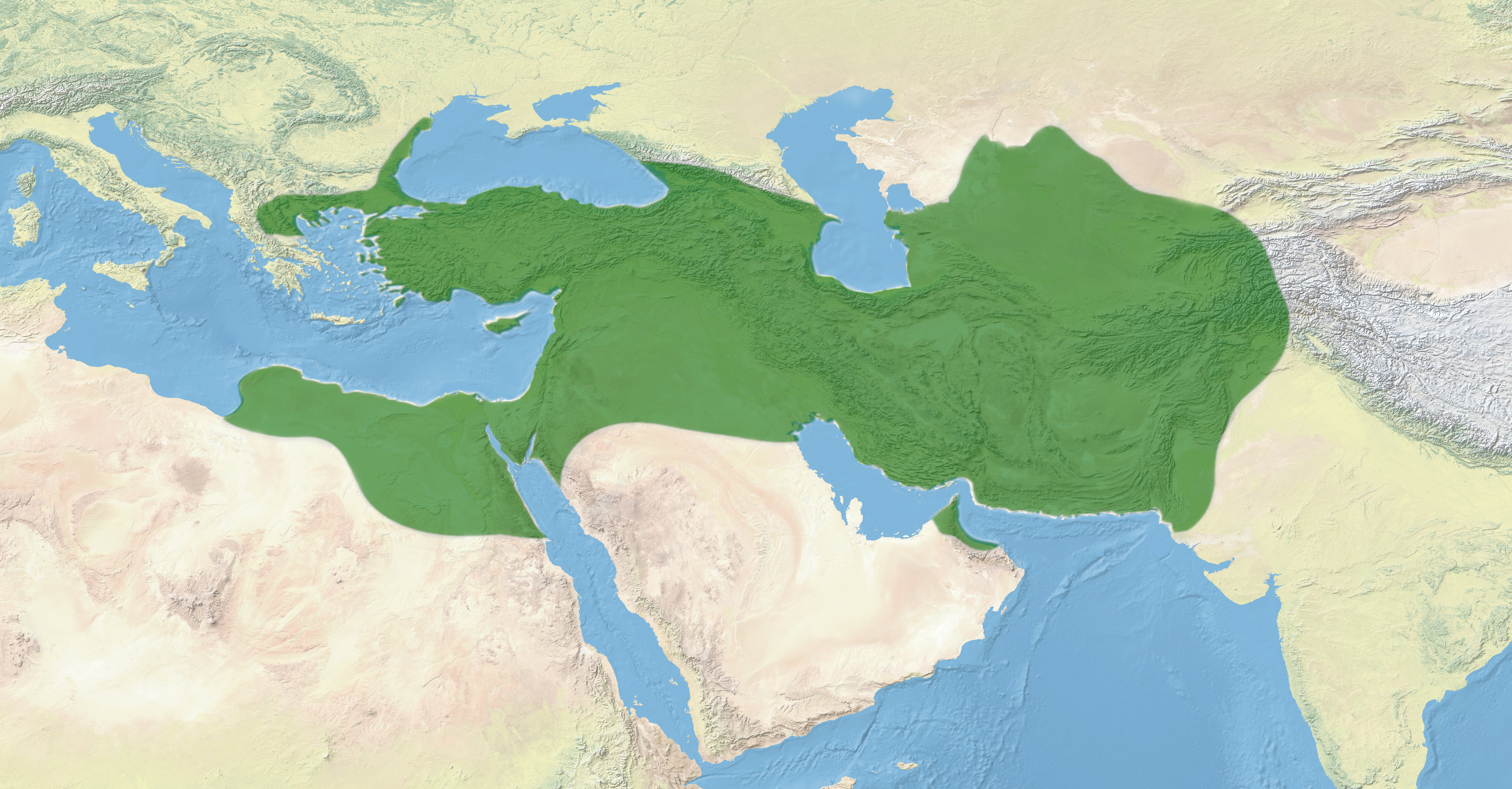
The Achaemenid Empire at its greatest territorial extent, under the rule of Darius I (522 BCE to 486 BCE).

=== Achaemenid Empire ===
Following the overthrow of the Medes by the Persians, they would inherit the former's territories but would significantly expand it. Eventually, this First Persian Empire (also better known as the Achaemenid Empire) would stretch three continents, namely Europe, Asia and Africa, encompassing 8 million square kilometers, and be the first world empire and the largest empire the world had yet seen in the ancient world. At its peak, it would stretch from Macedon and Paeonia-Bulgaria in the west, to the Indus Valley in the far east. Founded by Cyrus the Great, it was notable for embracing various civilizations and becoming the largest empire of the ancient history, for its successful model of a centralized, bureaucratic administration (through satraps under a king) and a government working to the profit of its subjects, for building infrastructure, such as a postal system and road systems and the use of an official language across its territories and a large professional army and civil services (inspiring similar systems in later empires), and for emancipating the slaves including the Jewish exiles in Babylon, and it is noted in Western history as the antagonist of the Greek city states during the Greco-Persian Wars.

With an estimated population of 50 million in 480 BCE, the Achaemenid Empire, at its peak, ruled over 44% of the world's population, the highest such figure for any empire in history.

The Greco-Persian Wars eventually culminated with the independence of Persia's westernmost territories (comprising Macedon, Thrace, and Paeonia) and the definitive withdrawal from the Balkans and Eastern Europe proper. In 333 B.C, following the Battle of Gaugamela, the Empire was overthrown and incorporated by Alexander the Great, starting a new period in Middle Eastern history, one noted by the emergence of Hellenistic and Greco-Persian culture, as well as dynasties (e.g. Kingdom of Pontus).

== 323 BCE – 64 BCE: Alexander's Hellenistic Empire ==
=== Alexander the Great ===
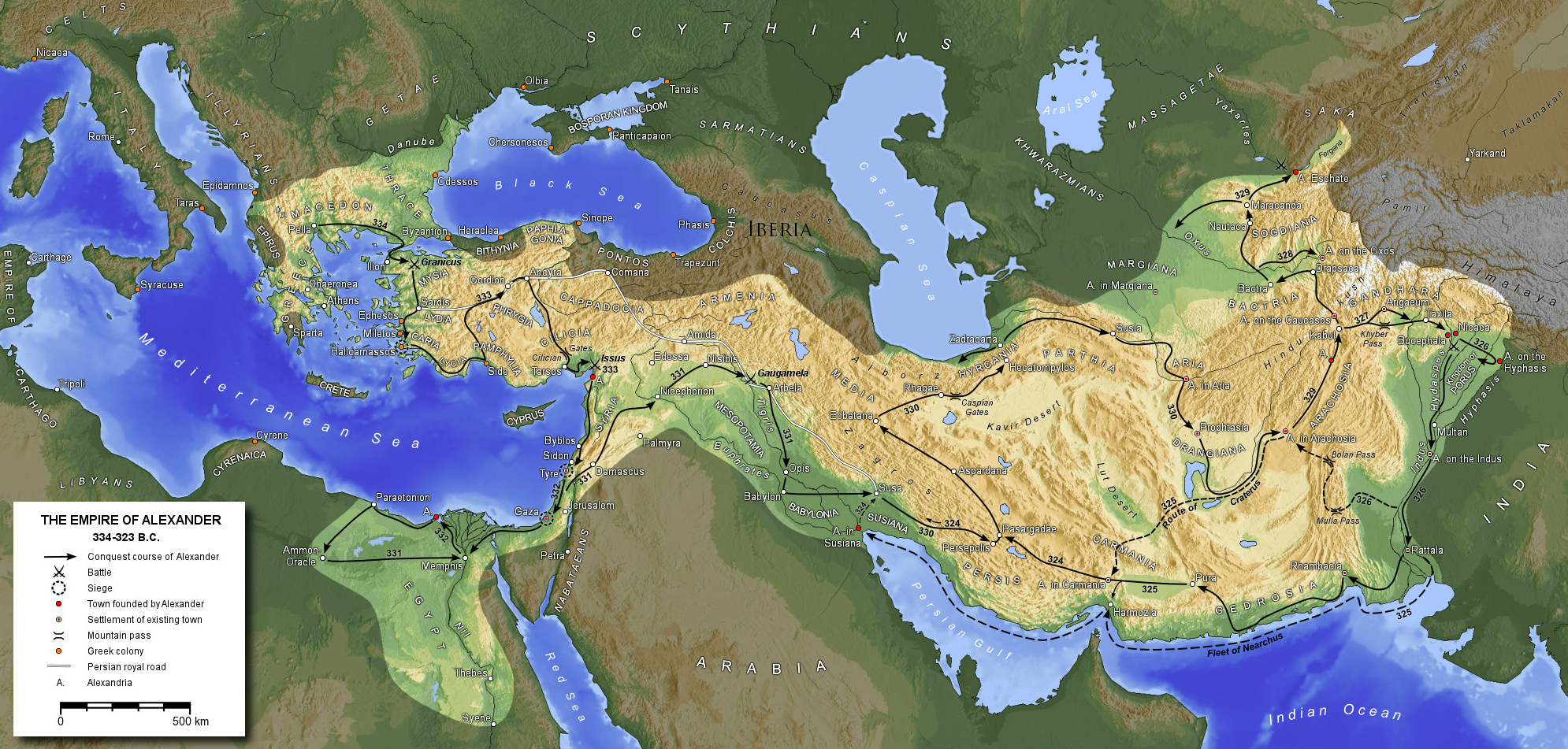
Alexander's Macedonian Empire and routes

The king of Macedon, Alexander III, to be known as Alexander the Great, came to the throne in October 336 BCE, aged 20. He would soon take control of the Persian empire and cover all the territories of the ancient world, as far as India. Alexander was a remarkable person who combined the military genius and political vision of his father Philip II of Macedon, with a literary bent romanticism and a taste for adventure.

In less than two years, Alexander secured the Greek and Thracian borders and gathered an army of 50,000 men for the assault on Asia. In his early campaigns, he always maintained a considerable fleet of warships and supplies for his soldiers. With him there were many scholars who recorded Alexander's discoveries and achievements far in the east.

In 334 BCE, Alexander fought the battle that would make his name, opposed by an army of Persians holding an advantageous position on the steep banks of the river Granicus. The unfamiliar tactics and brute strength of the highly disciplined Macedonian phalanx army, advancing with their heavy weapons, inflicted a crushing defeat to the Persian army, prompting the disgraced Persian commander to commit suicide.

Barely six months passed as, one by one, all of the cities on the west coast of Anatolia were taken by Alexander. As winter came on, Alexander headed for Lycia, southern Anatolia, where he annexed all of the cities he went through.

Amazingly, the Persians, who until that time had enjoyed a largely unchallenged dominance over the region, put up little resistance. Alexander left trusted lieutenants, as well as former Persian satraps, to rule his new conquests, as he continued on his relentless thrust to the very edge of the known world.

=== Seleucid and Ptolemaic Empires ===
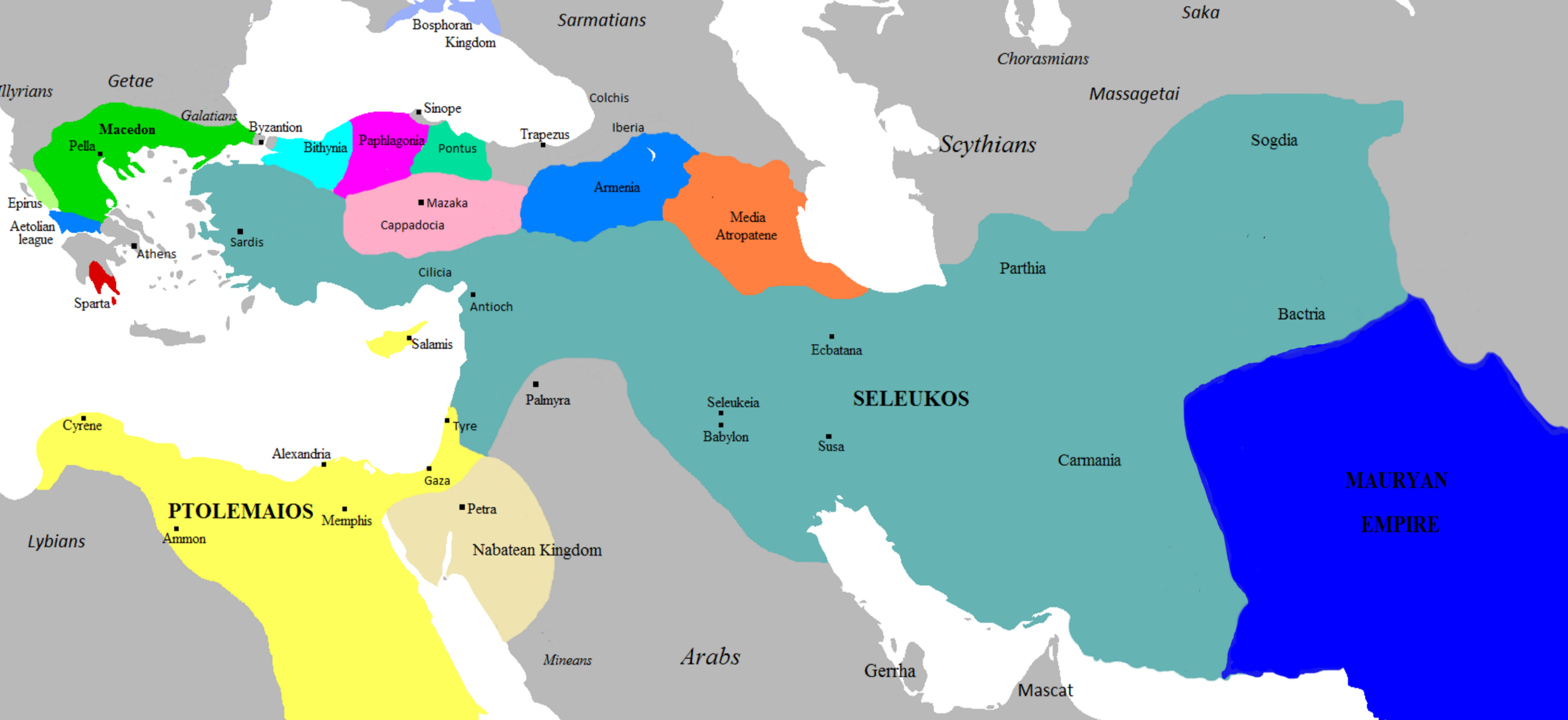
Seleucid and Ptolemaic kingdoms, centered at Antioch and Alexandria respectively

Alexander's conquest of Persia replaced the Achaemenids with the Seleucids, but the absence of a clear successor after his untimely death and the in-fighting that inevitably followed meant that his empire would not long outlive him.

The Seleucids and the Ptolemaic dynasty of Egypt quarreled over control of territory Alexander had conquered previously, mostly in the Middle East. Eventually, the Seleucids won their prize of controlling the Levant, Mesopotamia, Iran and parts of Anatolia adopting the title "Kings of Syria" later on; while Ptolemids established their stronghold in Egypt and adopted and promoted a blend of Greco-Egyptian culture adopting the title "Pharaoh".

== 88 BCE – 330 CE: the Roman, Armenian, Parthian and Palmyrene Empires ==
The wars between Rome and the Parthian Empire, which took place roughly from 53 BCE to 217 CE, were a unique episode in classical antiquity. Although Rome conquered nearly the entire civilized world around the Mediterranean, The Parthians were a constant thorn in the Roman side. In 270, Palmyrene queen Zenobia would rebel against Roman authority and establish her rule over all of the Eastern provinces located in modern-day Egypt, the Levant, and Anatolia.

When Roman expansion reached Mesopotamia, the Parthian Empire had already been prospering as a major power whose outskirts reached far into the east and trade routes ran deep into China. When Roman and Parthian borders finally met, the centuries that followed were a time of diplomacy and war between two empires of distinct cultures and methods of war.

Roman–Parthian relations dominated international policy in the classical near east. As opposed to less organized tribes on Rome's European borders, the Parthians were a sophisticated culture of commerce and empire. The Parthians garnered significant wealth from their trade routes and their cities stood as some of the largest in the world.

=== Armenian Empire ===
The Armenian Empire was a short lived state that rose to predominance under Tigranes the Great who conquered the entire middle east with the exception of the central and southern Arabia and western anatolia. For a short time he controlled the most powerful state on the planet.

=== Roman Empire ===
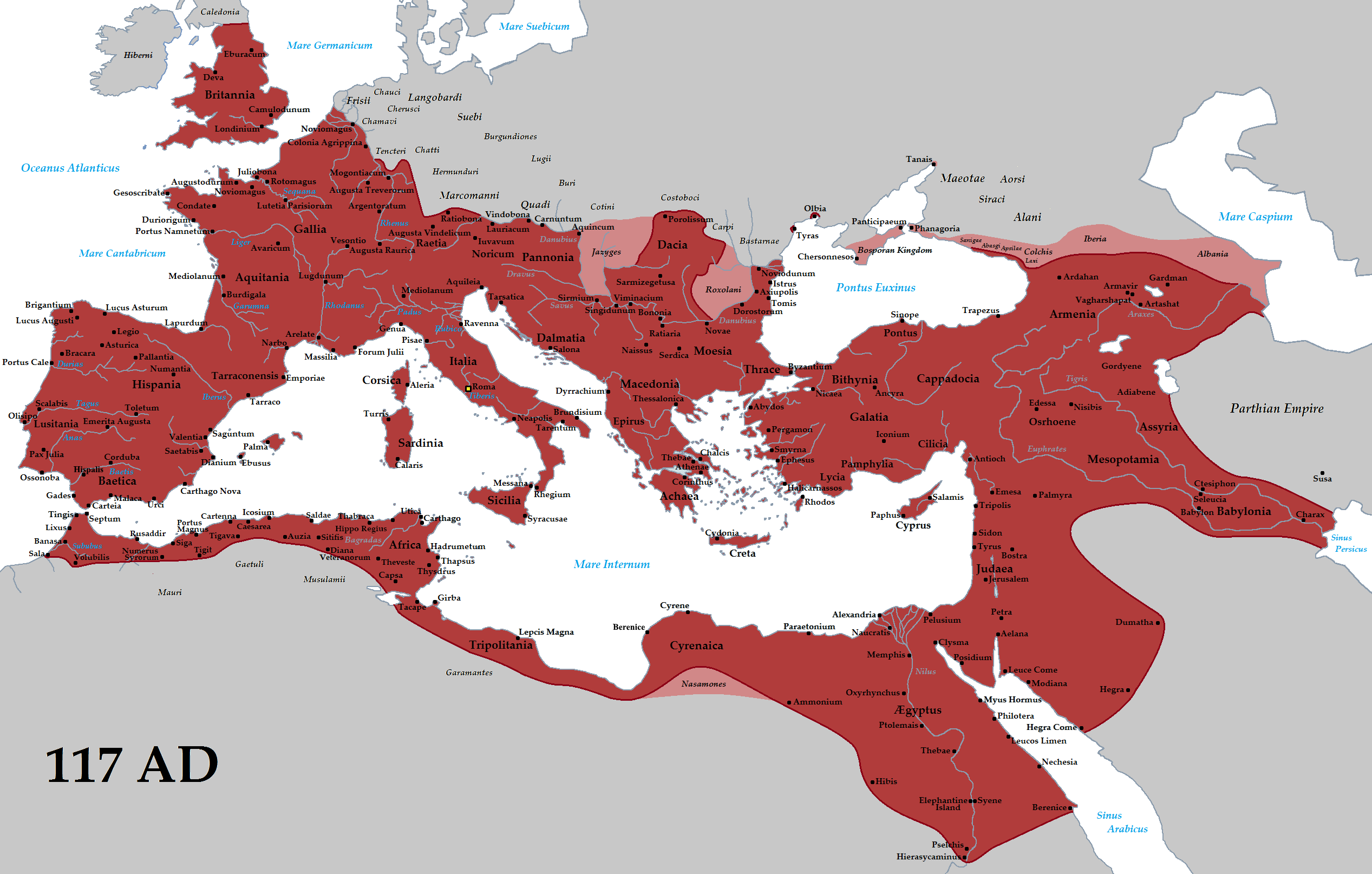
Roman Empire at its greatest extent under Trajan

The founding of Rome goes back to the very early days of Western civilization; so old is it, that it is today known as 'the eternal city'. The Romans believed that their city was founded in 753 BCE. Modern historians, though, believe it was 625 BCE.

In the 1st century BCE, the expanding Roman Republic absorbed the whole Eastern Mediterranean area, and under the Roman Empire the region was united with most of Europe and North Africa in a single political and economic unit. This unity facilitated the spread of Christianity, and by the 5th century, the whole region was Christian.

After the empire became divided into its western and eastern parts the Emperors of the East ruled from Constantinople over the lands of the Middle East as far east as the Euphrates and over the Balkans. This empire was a Greek-speaking, Christian empire, and became known to historians as the Byzantine Empire (from the earlier name of its capital city).

The Parthians ruled Persia parallel to the Han dynasty and around this time the Roman Empire reached the peak of its power. In this flourishing time and the next, Persia served as the link between Rome and China and was seen as of pivotal strategic importance by the Romans to safeguard their

=== Parthian Empire ===
Parthian Empire circa 94 BCE at its greatest extent under Mithridates II

Around 300 BCE, the Parthians, an Iranian tribe, invaded West Asia from Central Asia. Like the Scythians, and as the Persians when they first came to West Asia, the Parthians were nomadic people. They traveled around Central Asia with their horses and their cattle, grazing them on the expansive grasslands there.

The Parthians soon headed south into Alexander's empire. The recent death of Alexander the Great had heralded the beginning of the disintegration of his vast empire and the Parthians would be one of the main benefactors.

The Parthians immediately succeeded in taking over the middle part of Alexander's empire (roughly modern Iran). This split the Seleucid empire in half, leaving the Macedonian colonies in Bactria (modern Afghanistan) isolated. They stayed there for about 200 years, gradually assimilating the culture of West Asia.

By around 100 BCE, with Seleucia increasingly powerless, The Parthians started to take over parts of Eastern Seleucia. At the same time, the Romans started to take over parts of Western Seleucia. Eventually, the Romans and the Parthians met in the middle. At the Battle of Carrhae, in the year 53 BCE, the outnumbered Parthians won a decisive victory, and the Roman general Crassus was killed.

In 116 CE, the Roman emperor Trajan invaded the Parthian empire and conquered Babylon. The Parthians were in disarray at this time, due to civil wars, and unable to offer much resistance. But in 117, just a year later, Trajan's successor Hadrian gave up most of the land that Trajan had conquered.

However, eventually, these internal weaknesses caused the Parthian Empire to collapse and the Sassanid dynasty rose.

=== Palmyrene Empire ===
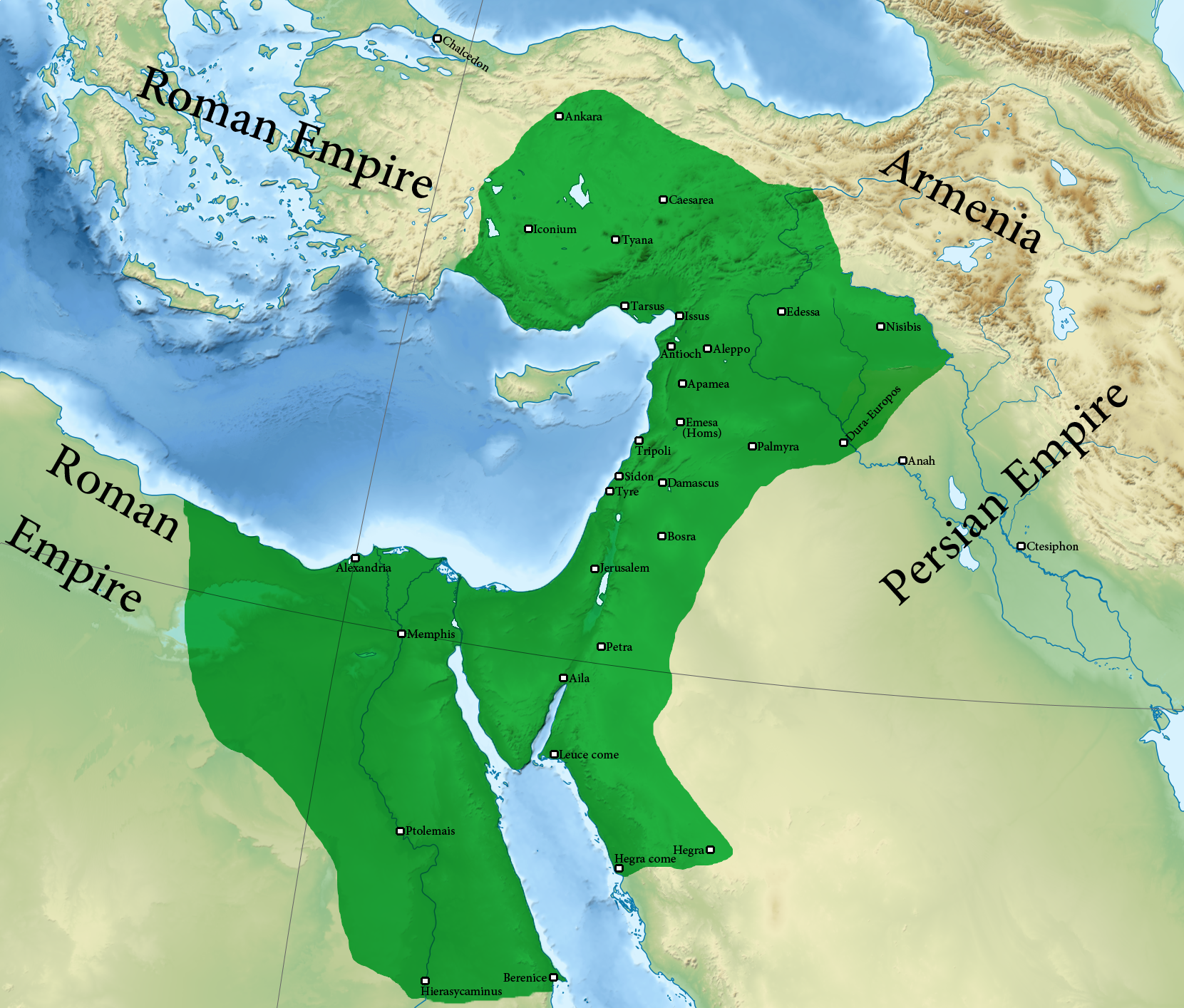
Palmyrene Empire under Zenobia

Zenobia started an expedition against the Tanukhids in the spring of 270, during the reign of emperor Claudius Gothicus aided by her generals, Septimius Zabbai (a general of the army) and Septimius Zabdas (the chief general of the army)

Zabdas sacked Bosra, killed the Roman governor, and marched south securing Roman Arabia. According to the Persian geographer Ibn Khordadbeh, Zenobia herself attacked Dumat Al-Jandal but could not conquer its castle. However, Ibn Khordadbeh is confusing Zenobia with al-Zabbā, a semi-legendary Arab queen whose story is often confused with Zenobia's story.

In October of 270, a Palmyrene army of 70,000 invaded Egypt, and declared Zenobia queen of Egypt. The Roman general Tenagino Probus was able to regain Alexandria in November, but was defeated and escaped to the fortress of Babylon, where he was besieged and killed by Zabdas, who continued his march south and secured Egypt. Afterward, in 271, Zabbai started the operations in Asia Minor, and was joined by Zabdas in the spring of that year. The Palmyrenes subdued Galatia, and occupied Ankara, marking the greatest extent of the Palmyrene expansion. However, the attempts to conquer Chalcedon were unsuccessful.

The Palmyrene conquests were done under the protective show of subordination to Rome. Zenobia issued coinage in the name of Claudius' successor Aurelian with Vaballathus depicted as king, (Note: Claudius died in August 270, shortly before Zenobia's invasion of Egypt.) while the emperor allowed the Palmyrene coinage and conferred the Palmyrene royal titles. However, toward the end of 271, Vaballathus took the title of Augustus (emperor) along with his mother.

== 330 CE – 632 CE: the Eastern Roman Empire, the Ghassanids, the Sassanids, and the Lakhmids ==
=== Eastern Roman Empire ===
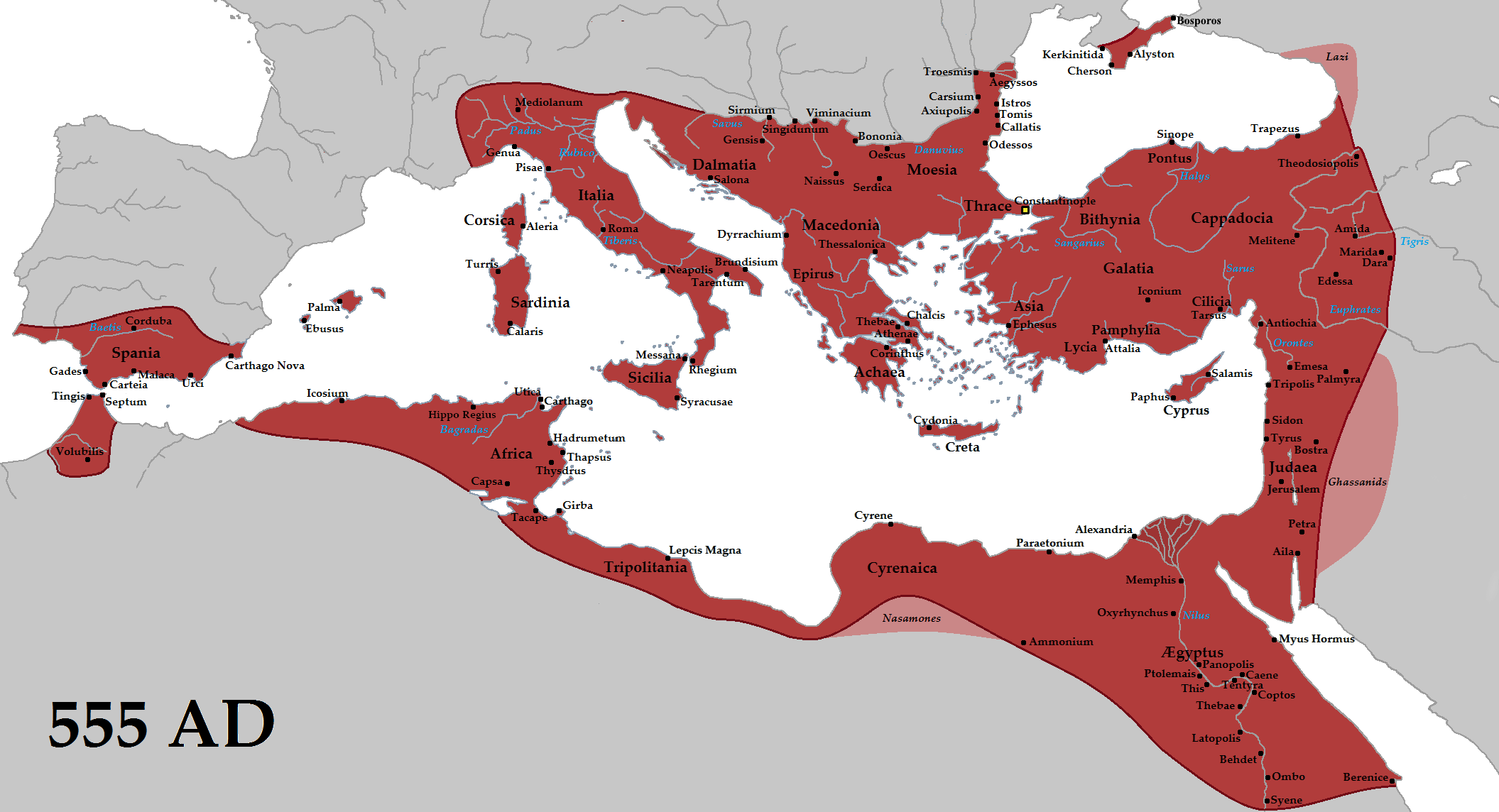
Byzantine Empire at its greatest extent c. 555 CE under Justinian II.

Constantinople, situated on the Bosporus Straits at the mouth of the Black Sea, became the capital of the Roman Empire in 330 CE after Constantine the Great founded the city on the site of the city of Byzantium. The city's status as residence of the Eastern Roman Emperor made it into the premier city in all of the Eastern Roman colonies in the Balkans, Syria, Jordan, Israel, Lebanon, Cyprus, Egypt, and part of present-day Libya.

The sack of Rome led to the fall of the Western Roman Empire. While the Roman polity survived in the East, its ongoing evolution led historians by the 16th century to recognize use of the term Byzantine Empire to distinguish it from the unified Roman Empire (notwithstanding the period of the Tetrarchy).

The Eastern Roman Empire reached its greatest extent in the 6th century under the emperor Justinian. The use of new military tactics and strategy, alliances, mercenary forces, and reforms in governance contributed to the survival of the Eastern Empire for further centuries, despite being greatly diminished in size after the Muslim conquest of the Levant. Surrounded by huge walls, Constantinople would be besieged repeatedly without success until the Fourth Crusade, after which the Empire would never recover, finally succumbing to the Ottoman Empire in 1453.

=== Sassanid Empire ===
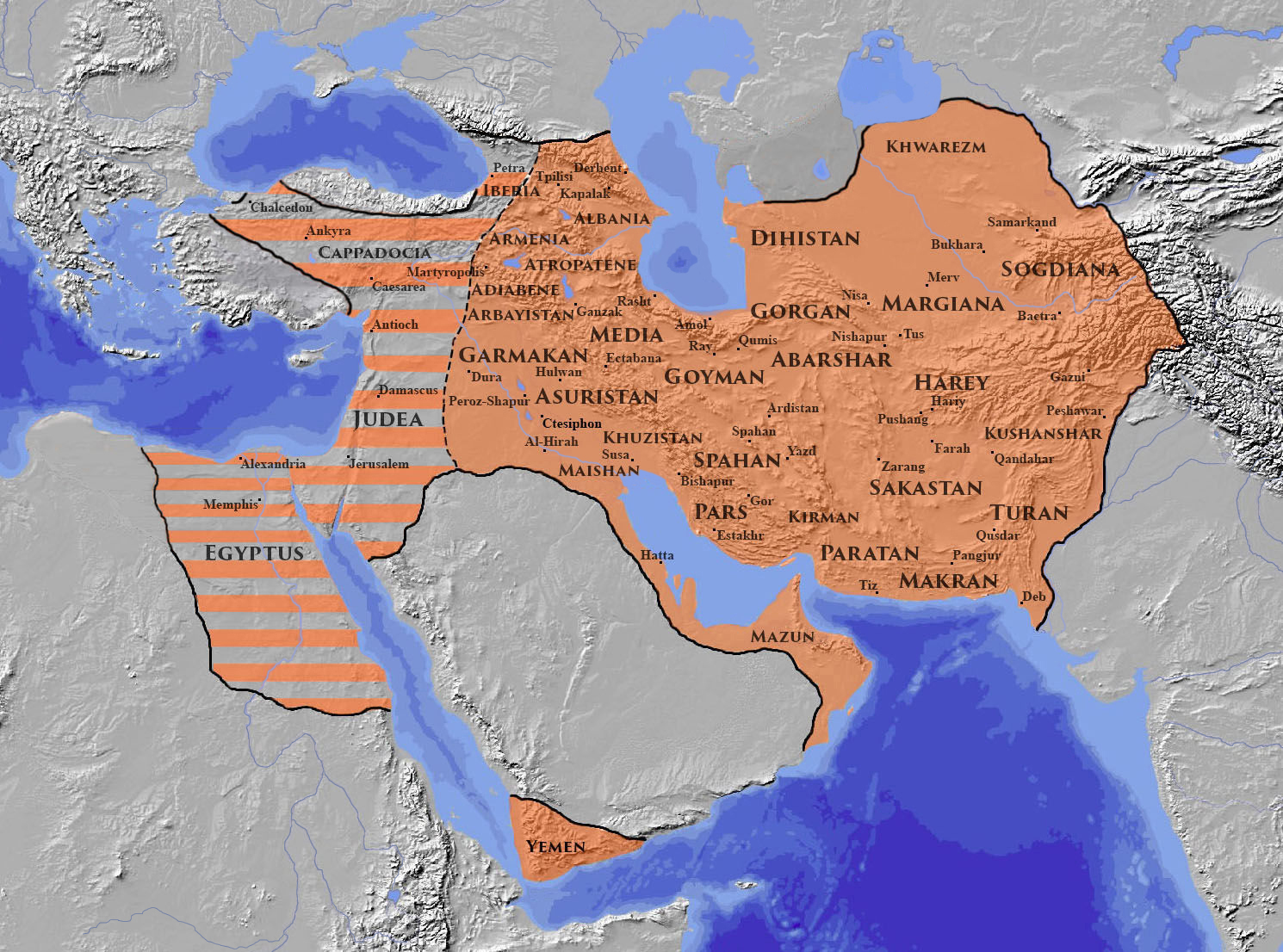
Sassanid Empire with its conquered territories shaded, circa 621 CE

The Sassanid era, encompassing the length of the Late Antiquity period, is considered to be one of the most important and influential historical periods in Iran. In many ways, the Sassanid period witnessed the highest achievement of Persian civilization and constituted the last great Iranian Empire before the Muslim conquest and adoption of Islam.

Whereas the Romans were seen as the main aggressors against the Parthians, these roles were very much reversed by the Sassanids in their aggressiveness against the Romans and later the Byzantines.

The Sassanids came to power on a wave of nationalism and pride. The first Shah of the Sassanid dynasty, Ardashir, promised to destroy the Hellenistic influence in Persia, avenge Darius III against the heirs of Alexander, and reconquer all the territories once held by the Achaemenid kings. The Shah saw the Romans as Persia's main enemy, and in the following wars that ensued, the Sassanids almost upheld the promises of Ardashir.

Ardashir began his reign by conquering the few lands left under Parthian control as well as invading Armenia. He blamed the Romans for aiding the Armenians, who were a close ally to Rome, and in 230 invaded Mesopotamia and besieged Nisibis, however unsuccessfully, while his cavalry threatened Cappadocia and Syria.

The Romans were shocked when they heard the Persians had invaded. They still thought of the Sassanids to be no different than the Parthians, however, the Sassanids were much different in terms of aggressiveness and nationalistic zeal and the Romans would soon realize this. The Romans sent a delegation to ask for Persian withdrawal, noting the past defeats of the Parthians by the Romans as a warning. Ardashir rejected and in 231 Rome mobilized for war under Severus Alexander, drawing troops from Egypt to the Black sea to form three massive armies.

Rome's forces, under Emperor Alexander split up into three columns, one which went to Armenia (the left column), one which went to the Euphrates (the right column), and one that stayed in Mesopotamia, led by the emperor himself. Ardashir engaged the right column in battle, defeated it, and on this note, Alexander decided to end the war and retreated, although a peace treaty was never signed.

In 233, after winning his wars in the east, Ardashir again invaded Rome, this time captured Nisibis and Carrhae. Ardashir extended the Persian Empire to Oxus in the north-east, to the Euphrates in the west, and on his death bed in 241, he passed on his crown to Shapur, who would carry on the war further into Rome.

The Sassanid dynasty revived the old Achaemenid traditions, including Zoroastrianism, as Ardashir had promised. However, exhausting wars with Byzantium left the empire unready to face the Muslim armies from Arabia.

=== Ghassanid Kingdom ===
Ghassanid territory as a vassal kingdom for the Romans

The Ghassanids were Arab Christians that were established in Hauran, southern Syria. The term Ghassan refers to the kingdom of the Ghassanids, and supposedly means "a spring of water". The Ghassanid state was founded after king Jaffna bin ‘Amr emigrated with his family and retinue north and settled in Hauran (south of Damascus).

The Ghassanid kingdom was an ally of the Byzantine Empire. More accurately the kings can be described as phylarchs, native rulers of subject frontier states. The capital was at Jabiyah in the Golan Heights. Geographically, it occupied much of Syria, Palestine and the northern Hijaz as far south as Yathrib (Medina). It acted as guardian of trade routes, policed Bedouin tribes and was a source of troops for the Byzantine army.

The Ghassanid king al-Harith ibn Jabalah (reigned 529–569) supported the Byzantines against Sassanid Persia and was given the title patricius in 529 by the emperor Justinian I. Al-Harith was a Monophysite Christian; he helped to revive the Syrian Monophysite (Jacobite) Church and supported Monophysite development despite Orthodox Byzantium regarding it as heretical. Later Byzantine mistrust and persecution of such religious unorthodoxy brought down his successors, al-Mundhir (reigned 569–582) and Nu'man.

The Ghassanids, who had successfully opposed the Persian allied Lakhmids of al-Hirah (Southern Iraq and Northern Arabia), prospered economically and engaged in much religious and public building; they also patronized the arts and at one time entertained the poets Nabighah adh-Dhubyani and Hassan ibn Thabit at their courts.

Ghassan remained a Byzantine vassal state until its rulers were overthrown by the Muslims in the 7th century, following the Battle of Yarmuk. It was at this battle that some 12,000 Ghassanid Arabs defected to the Muslim side due to the Muslims offering to pay their arrears in wages. Their real power, however, had been destroyed by the Persian invasion in 614.

=== Lakhmid Kingdom ===
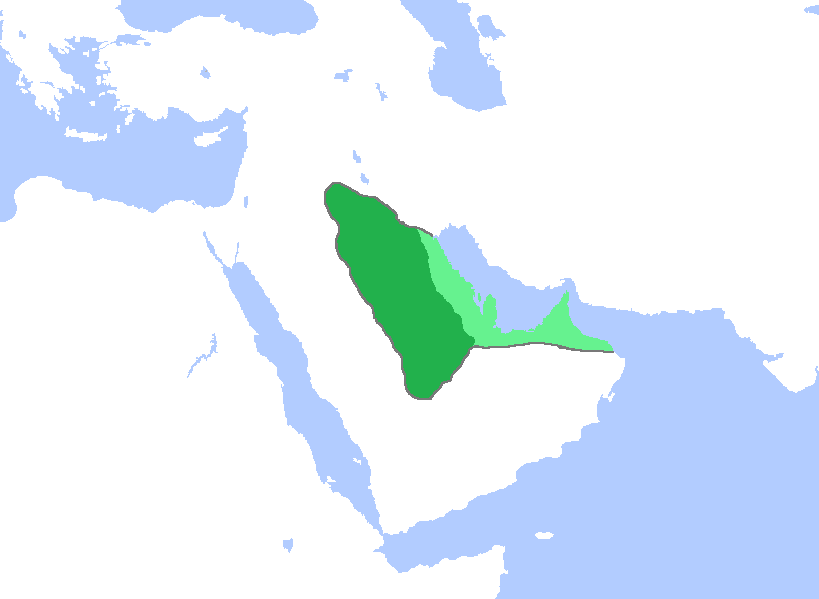
Lakhmid territory under House of Banu Nasr, with the Capital at Al-Hirah, Iraq, as a vassal for the Sassanids

Imru' al-Qais dreamt of a unified and independent Arab kingdom and, following that dream, he seized many cities in the Arabian Peninsula. He then formed a large army and developed the Kingdom as a naval power, which consisted of a fleet of ships operating along the Bahraini coast. From this position he attacked the coastal cities of Iran – which at that time was in civil war, due to a dispute as to the succession – even raiding the birthplace of the Sasanian kings, Fars province.

In 325, the Persians, led by Shapur II, began a campaign against the Arab kingdoms. When Imru' al-Qais realised that a mighty Persian army composed of 60,000 warriors was approaching his kingdom, he asked for the assistance of the Roman Empire. Constantine promised to assist him but was unable to provide that help when it was needed. The Persians advanced toward Hira and a series of vicious battles took place around and in Hira and the surrounding cities.

Shapur II's army defeated the Lakhmid army and captured Hira. In this, the young Shapur acted much more violently and slaughtered all the Arab men of the city and took the Arab woman and children as slaves. He then installed Aws ibn Qallam and retreated his army.

Imru' al-Qais escaped to Bahrain, taking his dream of a unified Arab nation with him, and then to Syria seeking the promised assistance from Constantius II which never materialized, so he stayed there until he died. When he died he was entombed at al-Nimarah in the Syrian desert.

Imru' al-Qais' funerary inscription is written in an extremely difficult type of script. Recently there has been a revival of interest in the inscription, and controversy has arisen over its precise implications. It is now certain that Imru' al-Qais claimed the title "King of all the Arabs" and also claimed in the inscription to have campaigned successfully over the entire north and centre of the peninsula, as far as the border of Najran.

Two years after his death, in the year 330, a revolt took place where Aws ibn Qallam was killed and succeeded by the son of Imru' al-Qais, 'Amr. Thereafter, the Lakhmids' main rivals were the Ghassanids, who were vassals of the Sassanians' arch-enemy, the Roman Empire. The Lakhmid kingdom could have been a major centre of the Church of the East, which was nurtured by the Sassanians, as it opposed the Chalcedonian Christianity of the Romans.

The Lakhmids remained influential throughout the sixth century. Nevertheless, in 602, the last Lakhmid king, al-Nu'man III ibn al-Mundhir, was put to death by the Sasanian emperor Khosrow II because of a false suspicion of treason, and the Lakhmid kingdom was annexed.

It is now widely believed that the annexation of the Lakhmid kingdom was one of the main factors behind the fall of the Sasanian Empire and the Muslim conquest of Persia as the Sassanians were defeated in the Battle of Hira by Khalid ibn al-Walid. At that point, the city was abandoned and its materials were used to reconstruct Kufa, its exhausted twin city.

According to the Arab historian Abu ʿUbaidah (d. 824), Khosrow II was angry with the king, al-Nu'man III ibn al-Mundhir, for refusing to give him his daughter in marriage, and therefore imprisoned him. Subsequently, Khosrow sent troops to recover the Nu'man family armor, but Hani ibn Mas'ud (Nu'man's friend) refused, and the Arab forces of the Sasanian Empire were annihilated at the Battle of Dhi Qar, near al-Hirah, the capital of the Lakhmids, in 609. Hira stood just south of what is now the Iraqi city of Kufa.

== 632 CE – 1922 CE: Islamic Empires and other Caliphates ==
According to Sunni Muslims, the first caliph was Abu Bakr Siddique, followed by Umar ibn al-Khattāb who was the first caliph to be called Amir al-Mu'minin and the second of the Four Rightly Guided Caliphs. Uthman ibn Affan and Ali ibn Abi Talib also were called by the same title, while the Shi'a consider Ali to have been the first truly legitimate caliph, although they concede that Ali accepted his predecessors because he eventually sanctioned Abu-Bakr. The rulers preceding these first four did not receive this title by consensus, and it was turned into a monarchy thereafter.

After the first four caliphs, the Caliphate was claimed by dynasties such as the Umayyads, the Abbasids, and the Ottomans, and for relatively short periods by other, competing dynasties in al-Andalus, North Africa, and Egypt. Mustafa Kemal Atatürk officially abolished the last Caliphate, the Ottoman Empire, and founded the Republic of Turkey, in 1924. The Kings of Morocco still label themselves with the title Amir al-Mu'minin for the Moroccans, but lay no claim to the Caliphate.

== See also ==
- Historical powers
- List of Bronze Age States
- List of Classical Age States
- List of former sovereign states
- List of empires
- List of Iron Age States
- List of kingdoms
- List of largest empires
- List of Late Antiquity Age States
- Political history of the world
