= Ninurta-tukulti-Ashur =

- King of Assyria

King of the Middle Assyrian Empire
- Reign: c. 1132 BC
- Predecessor: Ashur-dan I
- Successor: Mutakkil-nusku
- Father: Ashur-dan I

Ninurta-tukulti-Aššur, inscribed ^{md}Ninurta_{2}-tukul-ti-Aš-šur, was briefly king of Assyria c. 1132 BC, the 84th to appear on the Assyrian Kinglist, marked as holding the throne for his ṭuppišu, "his tablet," a period thought to correspond just to the inauguration year. He succeeded his father, the long-reigning Aššur-dān I, but the throne was very quickly usurped by his brother, Mutakkil-Nusku, and he was driven from Assur and sought refuge in the city of Sišil, on the Babylonian border, the scene of the final dénouement.

== Reign ==
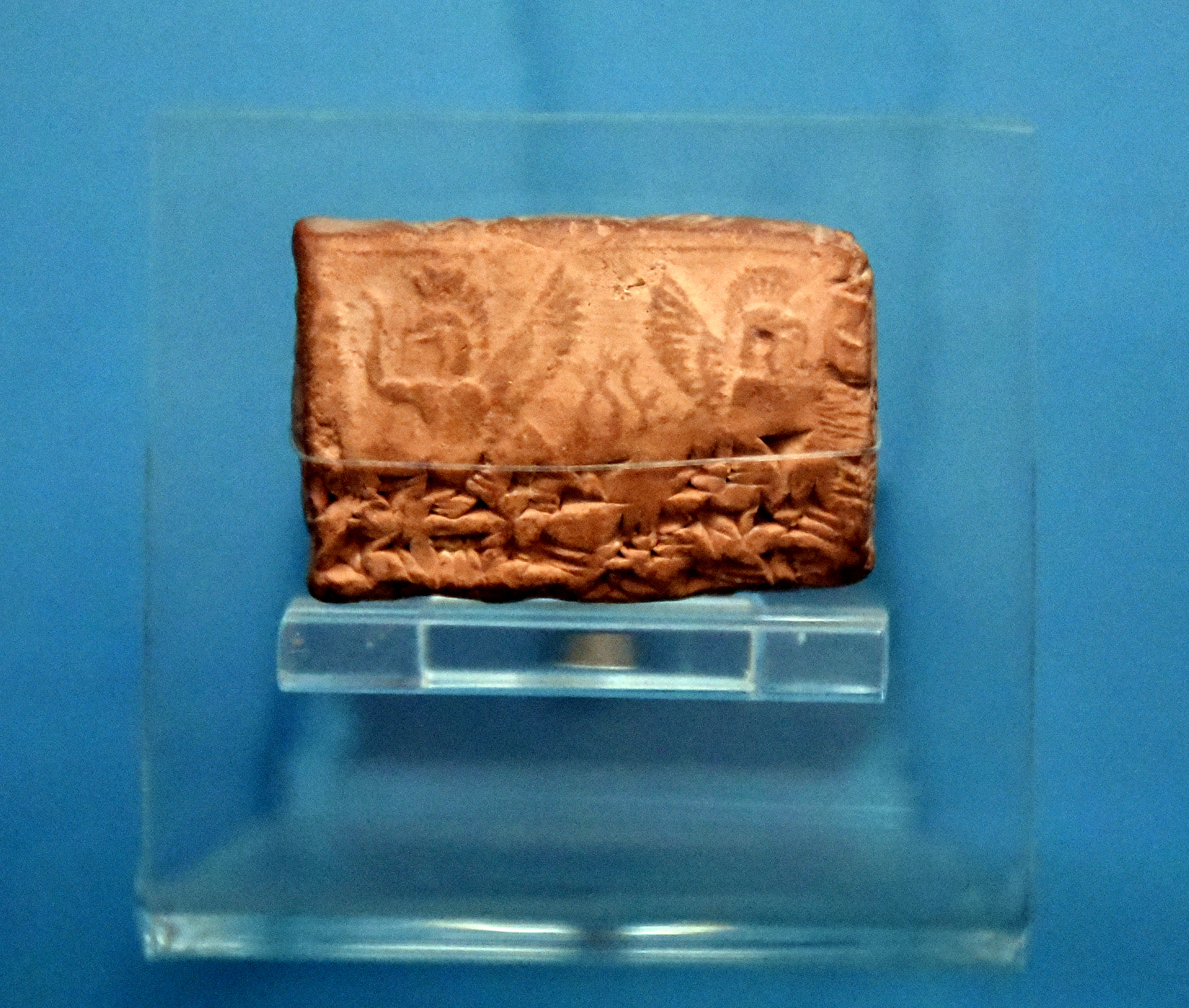
Receipt of sheep and goat, fees for religious purification conducted by the exorcist Res-Marduk for Rimeni, wife of the Assyrian king Ninurta-Tukulti-Assur. From Assur, Iraq. Middle Assyrian period, c. 1132 BC. Ancient Orient Museum, Istanbul

=== Coregency? ===
There is some conjecture that he may have ruled jointly with Aššur-dan I during Aššur-dan's declining years or perhaps shared some regnal duties as there is a significant archive of administrative texts (Note: Such as tablet KAJ 188.) concerning agricultural products, (from cities such as Arrapha), food distribution, and ritual offerings in the royal palace referencing him and his wife Rimeni on seals, one of which provides an early Assyrian chariot scene, but only three of these texts call him king.

=== Sole reign ===
Among these there is a reference to the partial demolition of a number of buildings in Kar-Tukulti-Ninurta, during his reign, and also a harem list. The Chronicle P (Note: Chronicle P (ABC 22), iv 12–13) which names him ^{m}Tukul-ti-Aššur, relates that during his reign, the statue of Marduk was returned to Babylon having languished in Assyria for sixty (?)-six years, something of an underestimate if the reading of this number is correct and a reconciliatory move likely to test his subjects' loyalty.

The Assyrian King List (Note: Assyrian Kinglist copies: Nassouhi, iii 43f, Khorsabad, iii 32f and SDAS iii 19f.) relates that "Mutakkil-Nusku, his brother, fought with him (and) carried him off to Karduniaš. Mutakkil-Nusku held the throne for 'his tablet' (and then) passed away." (Note: Khorsabad kinglist iii 34–36: ^{m}Mu-tak-kil-^{d}Nusku aḫu-šú itti-šú i-duk a-na ^{kur}Kar-du-ni-áš, e-bu-uk-šú ṭup-pi-šú ^{m}Mu-tak-kil-^{d}Nusku ^{giš}kussȗ, uk-ta-il šadâ e-mid.) A fairly recently recovered source provides additional insight into these events. From it we learn Ninurta-tukulti-Aššur seems to have kept the loyalty of provincial regions, while the heartland of Assyria sided with Mutakkil-Nusku, fueling a civil war. Into this milieu comes fragments (Note: Tablets BM 104727 (1913-5-12, 2) + Sm. 2116 and K. 212 + K. 4448.) of one, or perhaps two letters, from a Babylonian king, tentatively identified as Ninurta-nādin-šumi, although his predecessor Itti-Marduk-balāṭu or his successor Nabû-kudurrī-uṣur I could also conceivably be the author, addressed to and lambasting Mutakkil-Nusku and threatening to reinstate Ninurta-tukulti-Aššur. His Babylonian contemporary is not certain and the Synchronistic Kinglist (Note: Synchronistic King List ii 12 KAV 216 (tablet Ass 14616c).) gives a counterpart whose name begins with, or contains, the theophoric element Marduk-, with other fragmentary copies (Note: Synchronistic King List fragment KAV 10, 3 (tablet VAT 11261).) (Note: Synchronistic King List fragment KAV 12, 1 (tablet VAT 11338).) providing no further insight. The text of the letter(s) is poorly preserved, and difficult to interpret, but the Babylonian quotes the Assyrian in his description of his brother as ku-lu-'-ú la zi-ka-ru šu-ú, "a kulu'u, not a man," where the term may mean a 'feminized castrato cultic performer'. The deadlock was apparently broken by the attack by Mutakkil-Nusku's forces on Ninurta-tukultī-Aššur's border stronghold of Sišil, after which both brothers disappeared from history, perhaps falling in their fratricidal battle – and Mutakkil-Nusku's son Aššur-reš-iši I assumed the throne.

== Inscriptions ==
Preceded by Ashur-dan I	King of Assyria; 1132 BC	Succeeded by Mutakkil-Nusku
