= Itti-Marduk-balatu =

Itti-Marduk-balāṭu may refer to

== Known period ==
- Itti-Marduk-balāṭu (vizier), vizier to Kassite Babylonian king Kadašman-Enlil II, ca. 1263 BC
- Itti-Marduk-balāṭu (eunuch), Kassite Babylonian king Meli-Šipak’s (ca. 1186–1172 BC) eunuch and witness to a land grant to Hasardu, kudurru BM 90829
- Itti-Marduk-balāṭu (king), 2nd Dynasty of Isin, king of Babylon ca. 1146–1132 BC
- Itti-Marduk-balāṭu (governor), father of Kadašman-Buriaš, governor of Dūr-Kurigalzu, who was captured by Assyrian king Ashur-bel-kala, ca. 1070 BC
- Itti-Marduk-balāṭu (prelate), chief administrator (prelate) of Eanna of Uruk from 674 BC possibly to 666 BC, correspondent with Assyrian king Esarhaddon
- Itti-Marduk-balāṭu (entrepreneur), neo-Babylonian entrepreneur of the Egibi family, head of the firm from 544 to 521 BC
- Itti-Marduk-balāṭu (scribe), son of Labasi, Babylonian scribe, ca. 280-279 BC
- Itti-Marduk-balāṭu (temple letter), recipient of letter from temple during reign of Antiochus II Theos, 261 – 246 BC
- Itti-Marduk-balāṭu (Royal Game of Ur), author of instructions for the Royal Game of Ur written on 3 November 177-176 BC, tablet BM 33333b
- Itti-Marduk-balāṭu (astronomer), son of Iddin-Bēl, astronomer of Esagil, the temple of Marduk, in Babylon during the Seleucid period, ca 127 BC

== Uncertain date ==
- Itti-Marduk-balāṭu (diviner), son of Ša-našī-šu, scribe (author?) of Pān-tākalti tablet 15, Babylonian liver omens
- Itti-Marduk-balāṭu (miller), son of Mīnû-bēl-dānu, late Hellenistic Babylonian miller, tablets BM 16908 and 78957
