= Marduk-kabit-ahheshu =

Marduk-kabit-aḫḫēšu
- King of Babylon
- Reign: 18 regnal years c. 1153–1136 BC (Note: Previous scholarship assumed that Marduk-kabit-ahheshu, ruled for the first years of his reign concurrently with the last Kassite king, but per Beaulieu (2018), more recent research suggests that this was not the case. 1153–1136 BC are Beaulieu's revised dates. In older sources Marduk-kabit-ahheshu's reign is typically given as 1157–1140 BC.)
- Predecessor: Enlil-nādin-aḫe (Kassite Dynasty)
- Successor: Itti-Marduk-balāṭu
- House: 2nd Dynasty of Isin

Marduk-kabit-aḫḫēšu, "Marduk is the most important among his brothers", c. 1153–1136 BC, was the founder of the 2nd Dynasty of Isin, which was to rule Babylon until around 1022 BC. He apparently acceded in the aftermath of the Elamite overthrow of the Kassite Dynasty. His name and length of reign are most clearly ascertained from the Babylonian King List C (Note: Babylonian King List C.) which gives 18 years for his rule. (Note: King List A ii 17, only gives 17 years)

== Biography ==
The name of the dynasty, BALA PA.ŠE, is a wordplay on the term išinnu, “stalk,” written as PA.ŠE and is the only apparent reference to the actual city of Isin as the seat of their rule was elsewhere. He should not be confused with the Middle-Assyrian scribe of the same name who authored two documents (Note: KAR 24 and AfO TV [1927] 71-73.) in the library of Tukultī-apil-Ešarra around 30 years later.

His Elamite contemporary was probably Shilhak-Inshushinak I, the brother and successor of Kutir-Nahhunte II. In a series of campaigns he seems to have driven out the Elamite hordes. Whether there was an Elamite interregnum between the fall of the previous dynasty and the resumption of local rule or whether there was an overlap with the previous Kassite dynasty has not been determined. The Babylonian tradition has his succession following seamless after that of the last Kassite king, but this is unlikely. After seeing off the Elamites, he turned his attention to Assyria and the north, capturing the city of Ekallatum.

The dynasty marks the ascendance of the cult of Marduk, since 6 of the 11 kings of the dynasty were to include his name as a theophoric element, and he was to become entrenched as the supreme deity of the pantheon. He was succeeded by his son, Itti-Marduk-balāṭu.
