= Mutakkil-Nusku =

- King of Assyria

King of the Middle Assyrian Empire
- Reign: c. 1132 BC
- Predecessor: Ninurta-tukulti-Ashur
- Successor: Ashur-resh-ishi I
- Issue: Ashur-resh-ishi I
- Father: Ashur-Dan I

Mutakkil-Nusku, inscribed ^{m}mu-ta/tak-kil-^{d}PA.KU (meaning "he whom Nusku endows with confidence") was king of Assyria briefly c. 1132 BC, during a period of political decline. He reigned sufficiently long to be the recipient of a letter or letters from the Babylonian king, presumed to be Ninurta-nādin-šumi, in which he was lambasted and derided.

== Reign ==
=== Usurpation ===
He appears on the Khorsabad Kinglist (Note: Khorsabad Kinglist, iii 35–36.) which relates that “Mutakkil-Nusku, his (Ninurta-tukultī-Aššur’s) brother, fought against him. He drove him to Karduniaš (Babylonia).” Contemporary evidence suggests that Ninurta-tukultī-Aššur sought sanctuary in the border town of Sišil, where Mutakkil-Nusku’s forces engaged him in battle, the outcome of which is lost.

He was a younger son of the long-reigning king, Aššur-dān I (c. 1179 to 1134 BC) and succeeded his brother Ninurta-tukultī-Aššur, whom he ousted in a coup and subsequently went on to fight in a civil war that seems to have pitched the Assyrian heartland against its provinces.

The fragments of one or perhaps two Middle Assyrian letters exist, (Note: Tablet fragments BM 55498 and 55499, K 212+4448 (+) Sm 2116+BM 104727.) from an unnamed Babylonian king, possibly Ninurta-nādin-šumi, to Mutakkil-Nusku, where he is told that "You should act according to your heart (ki libbika).” The text lambastes him for failing to keep an appointment, or a challenge, in Zaqqa and seems to confirm that Ninurta-tukultī-Aššur had reached exile in Babylonia.

=== Death ===
His victory was short-lived as ṭuppišu Mutakkil-Nusku kussâ ukta'il KUR-a e-mid, “(he) held the throne for ṭuppišu (his tablet), then died,” perhaps his inaugural year and part way into his first year only. One interpretation suggests this was while his father still nominally ruled. Apart from a brief economic text concerning 100 sheep of Mutakkil-Nusku, without a royal title, and his appearance in the genealogies of his descendants such as one of his sons, Aššur-rēša-iši I, there are no other extant inscriptions.

== Inscriptions ==
Preceded by Ninurta-tukulti-Ashur	King of Assyria; 1132 BC	Succeeded by Ashur-resh-ishi I
