= Ashur-resh-ishi I =

- King of Assyria
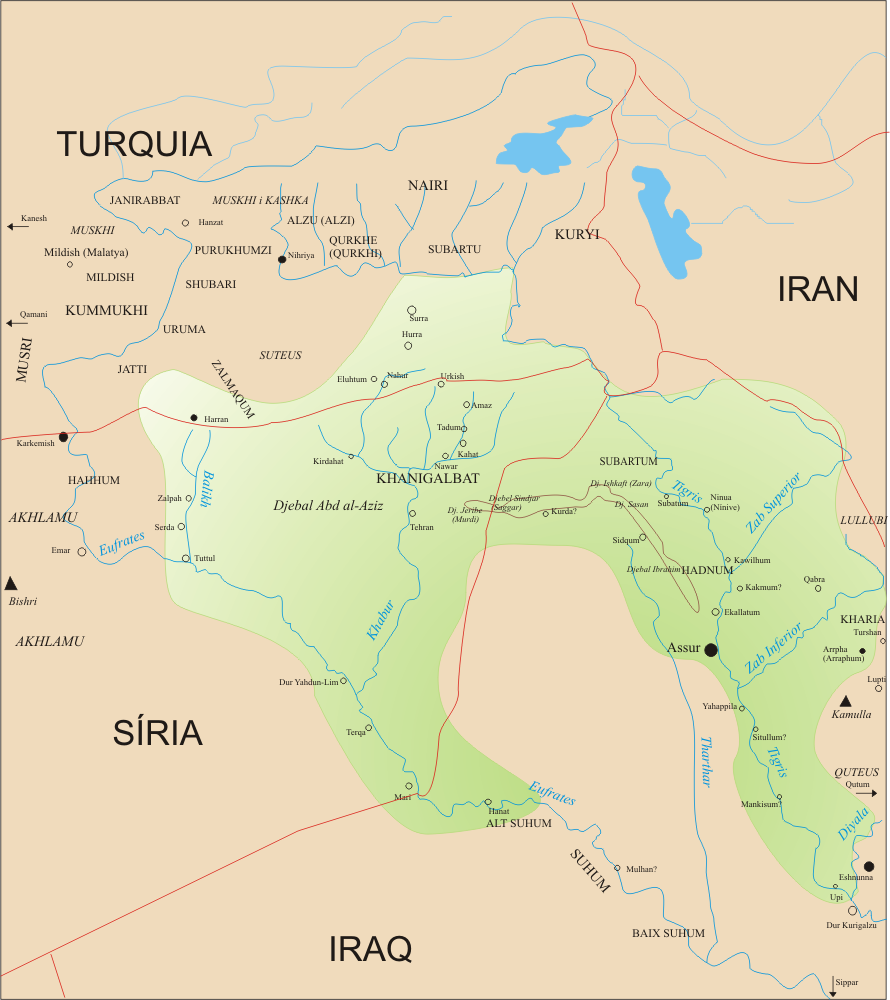
- Assyria under Ashurreshishi

King of the Middle Assyrian Empire
- Reign: 1132–1115 BC
- Predecessor: Mutakkil-nusku
- Successor: Tiglath-Pileser I
- Died: 1115 BC
- Issue: Tiglath-Pileser I
- Father: Mutakkil-nusku

Aššur-rēša-iši I, inscribed ^{m}aš-šur-SAG-i-ši (meaning "Aššur has lifted my head") ruled 1132–1115 BC, son of Mutakkil-Nusku, was a king of the Middle Assyrian Empire, and the 86th ruler to appear on the Assyrian King List (Note: Assyrian King List’s: Nassouhi, iv 4, 6; Khorsabad, iii 37, 39; SDAS, iii 23, 25.) and ruled for 18 years. (Note: On king list: 18 MU^{meš} šarru-ta īpuš^{uš}.) The Synchronistic King List (Note: Synchronistic King List, tablet excavation number Ass. 14616c (KAV 216), ii 14–16.) and its fragmentary copies (Note: Synchronistic King List fragment, tablet VAT 11261 (KAV 10), i 5.) (Note: Synchronistic King List fragment, tablet VAT 11338 (KAV 12), 3f.) give him as a contemporary of the Babylonian kings Ninurta-nādin-šumi, Nebuchadnezzar I and Enlil-nādin-apli, although the last of these is unlikely per the commonly accepted chronology.

== Biography ==
His royal titles included “merciless hero in battle, crusher of the enemies of Aššur, strong shackle binding the insubmissive, one who puts the insubordinate to flight, …murderer of the extensive army of the Ahlamȗ (and) scatterer of their forces, the one who … defeats the lands of […], the Lullubû, all the Qutu and their entire mountainous region and subdues them at his feet…” He styled himself mutēr gimilli māt Aššur, “avenger of Assyria,” and seems to have directed his earlier campaigns to the east, as a broken chronicle (Note: Assyrian Chronicle Fragment 3, known as the “Chronicle of Aššur-reš-iši.”) records his campaign staged from the Assyrian city of Arbela (modern Erbil) into disputed areas of the Zagros mountains where his shock troops (ḫurādu) encountered the Babylonian king Ninurta-nādin-šumi, here called Ninurta-nādin-šumāti, whose forces characteristically “fled,” a recurring motif in Assyrian accounts of their relationship with their southern neighbour.

Pressures from the west, however, were to draw Aššur-rēša-iši’s attention, and that of his successors’, as the widespread (rapšāti) hordes of Ahlamȗ nomadic Semitic tribesmen were driven by the deprivations of climate change into the Assyrian hinterland. Here he may also have encountered Nabû-kudurrī-uṣur, who like him claimed victories against the Amorite lands and the Lullubû. (Note: Kudurru BM 90858, BBSt 6 grant to LAK-ti Marduk.)

The Synchronistic History (Note: Synchronistic History, ii 1–13.) has a lengthy passage concerning his conflicts with Nebuchadnezzar I. Initially, they established an amicable relationship. However the Babylonian king subsequently besieged the Assyrian fortress of Zanqi in central Mesopotamia and when Aššur-rēša-iši approached with his relief force, Nebuchadnezzar I torched his siege engines (nēpešū) to prevent their capture and withdrew. On a second campaign, he laid siege to the fortress of Idi and the arrival of the Assyrian army resulted in a pitched battle in which he “brought about his total defeat, slaughtered his troops and carried off his camp. Forty of his chariots with harness were taken away and Karaštu, Nebuchadnezzar I's field-marshal, was captured.”

The later king Šulmānu-ašarēdu III credited him with rebuilding the city wall of Assur in his own rededication. His own brick inscriptions from the same city identify him as builder of the temple of the gods Adad and An, Ištar of Assyria and Aššur. He built a palace in Bumariyah, ancient Apqu ša Adad' as witnessed by a baked brick inscription. His most significant construction efforts were witnessed at his capital, Nineveh, the location of his palace, the Egalšaḫulla (“The Palace of Joyfulness”), where he rebuilt the tower-gates of the temple of Ishtar which had been damaged by earthquakes during the earlier reigns of Šulmānu-ašarēdu I (c. 1274–1245 BC) and Aššur-dān I (c. 1179 to 1134 BC), the latter being his grandfather. These were flanked by monumental statues of lions.

His palace edict concerning men fraternizing with palace women gives the penalty of execution, with silent witnesses considered a party to the event and punished by being thrown into an oven. The sequence of limmu officials in the eponym dating system is not known, as column 2 of the only extant list is damaged at this point.

He was succeeded by his son, the powerful Tiglath-Pileser I, who expanded the Middle Assyrian Empire significantly.

== Inscriptions ==
Preceded by Mutakkil-Nusku	King of Assyria; 1132–1115	Succeeded by Tiglath-Pileser I
