= Ninurta-nadin-shumi =

Ninurta-nādin-šumi
- King of Babylon
- Reign: c. 1127–1122 BC (Note: Previous scholarship assumed that Marduk-kabit-ahheshu, the founder of the second dynasty of Isin, ruled for the first years of his reign concurrently with the last Kassite king, but per Beaulieu (2018), more recent research suggests that this was not the case. Ninurta-nadin-shumi has previously been dated to about 1132–1126 BC, with 1127–1122 BC being Beaulieu's revised dates.)
- Predecessor: Itti-Marduk-balāṭu
- Successor: Nabû-kudurrῑ-uṣur I
- House: 2nd Dynasty of Isin

Ninurta-nādin-šumi, (Note: Ninurta-nādin-šumāti in the Chronicle of Aššur-reš-iši) inscribed ^{md}MAŠ-na-din-MU (Note: Babylonian King List C, 3.) or ^{d}NIN.IB-SUM-MU, (Note: Dagger, Musée du Louvre, L. 36 cm; another dagger on Tehran art market.) “Ninurta (is) giver of progeny,” c. 1127–1122 BC, was the 3rd king of the 2nd dynasty of Isin and 4th dynasty of Babylon. He reigned for seven years, contemporaneously with Aššur-reš-iši, (Note: Synchronistic King List, KAV 216, Ass. 14616c, ii 14.) c. 1133 to 1115 BC, the Assyrian king with whom he clashed.

== Biography ==
His relationship with his immediate predecessor, Itti-Marduk-balāṭu, is uncertain. Two brief identical inscriptions written in his name on Lorestān bronze daggers give a grandiose titulary, “king of the world, king of Babylon, king of Sumer and Akkad,” which would be slavishly imitated by his successors. Also, a kudurru has been tentatively dated to this period. A fragmentary epic (Note: The Chronicle of Aššur-reš-iši, VAT 10281, translation at Livius.) describes the conflict between the Assyrian king, Aššur-reš-iši, and Ninurta-nādin-šumi, when the disputed upper Diyala border region and the city of Arbela were contested between them, and suggests the Babylonians withdrew (“fled”) the city on the approach of Assyrian forces. Although the text is too fragmentary to provide a firm interpretation, it is probably significant that his forces (emūqīšu) penetrated so far north into the Assyrian heartland.

He may be the author of a rather condescending letter to Aššur-reš-iši, preserved in two pieces, in which he chastises the Assyrian king for failing to keep an appointment in the border town of Zaqqa, “If only you had waited one day for me in the city of Zaqqa!.” He threatens to reinstate on the Assyrian throne the king’s predecessor to his predecessor, Ninurta-tukulti-Ashur, who had supposedly been welcomed in exile in Babylon following his overthrow by Mutakkil-Nusku, according to a later chronicle. The text features three characters: the servant Qunnutu, his master Ashur-shumu-lishir, possibly another pretender to the Assyrian throne, and Ḫarbi-šipak, the Habirū, who may be an envoy of the Babylonian king, but with no other ancient reference to these individuals their roles are uncertain.

He was primarily remembered in antiquity as the father of his successor, the celebrated king Nabû-kudurrῑ-uṣur I. His descendants continued to reign through three more generations until the seventh king of the dynasty, Marduk-šāpik-zēri.
