= Enlil-nadin-apli =

Enlil-nādin-apli
- King of Babylon
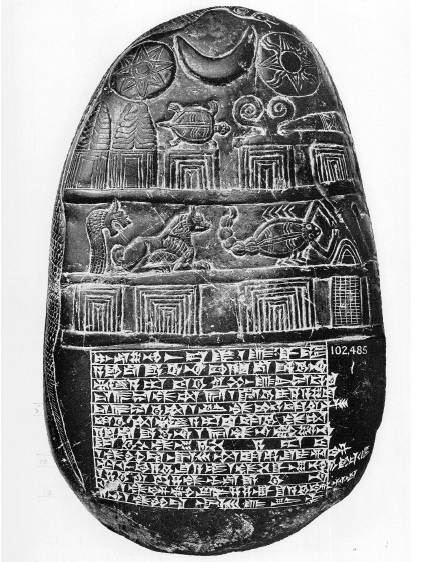
- The Gula-eresh kudurru from the period of Enlil-nādin-apli (Note: Dark limestone kudurru BM 102485.)
- Reign: c. 1099–1096 BC (Note: Previous scholarship assumed that Marduk-kabit-ahheshu, the founder of the second dynasty of Isin, ruled for the first years of his reign concurrently with the last Kassite king, but per Beaulieu (2018), more recent research suggests that this was not the case. Enlil-nadin-apli has previously been dated to about 1103–1100 BC, with 1099–1096 BC being Beaulieu's revised dates.)
- Predecessor: Nabû-kudurrī-uṣur
- Successor: Marduk-nādin-aḫḫē
- House: 2nd Dynasty of Isin

Enlil-nādin-apli, "Enlil (is) giver of an heir," reigned c. 1099–1096 BC, was the 5th king of the 2nd dynasty of Isin, and the 4th dynasty of Babylon. He was the son and successor of Nabu-kudurri-usur (Note: King List C, 5.) and was toppled by a revolt led by his uncle, Marduk-nādin-aḫḫē.

== Biography ==
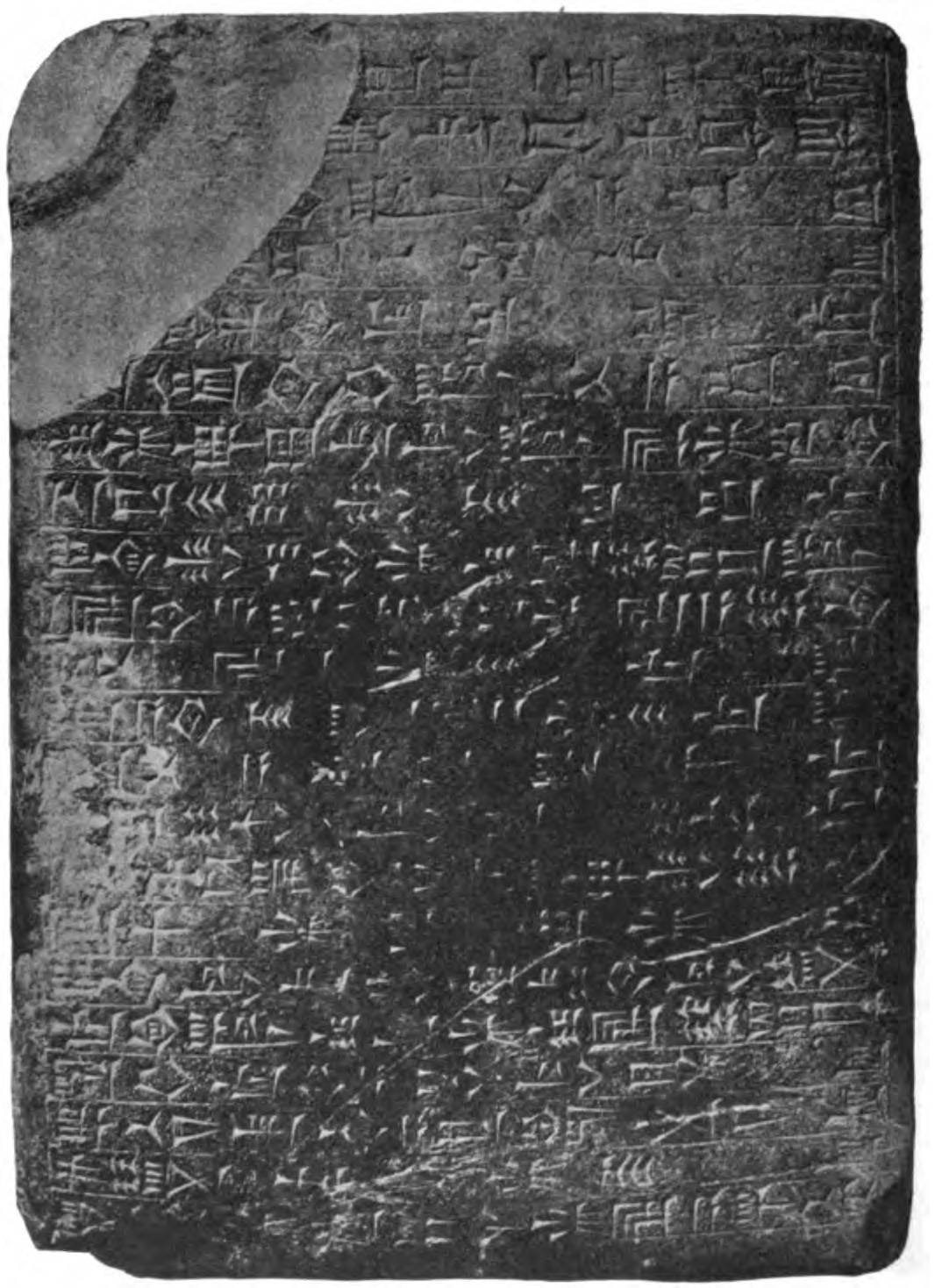
Black limestone kudurru of the time of Enlil-nādin-apli, (Note: Kudurru CBM 13, published as BE I/1 83.) in the University Museum, Philadelphia.

There are few contemporary artifacts attesting to his brief rule. A Lorestān bronze dagger is inscribed with his name and title. A kudurru records the outcome of an inquiry instigated by the king in his 4th year into the ownership of a plot of land claimed by a temple estate. Ekarra-eqisha and Eanna-šuma-iddina, the governors of Bit-Sin-magir and Sealand respectively, were charged with the investigation which upheld a claim based on the actions of an earlier king Gulkišar who had “drawn for Nanshe, his divine mistress, a land boundary.” It contains perhaps the earliest example of a Distanzangaben statement recording that 696 years had elapsed between Nabû-kudurrī-uṣur (Enlil-nadin-apli's father) and Gulkišar, the 6th king of the 1st Dynasty of the Sealand, a contemporary of Samsu-ditāna.

A second undated kudurru is reckoned to be from this period, that of Gula-eresh (pictured), because the same governor of Sealand, Eanna-šuma-iddina, also appears on it, this time granting 5 kur of land to his servant. It is particularly noteworthy for the exuberance of its curses:

…may Anu, Enlil, Ea and Ninmaḫ the great gods, curse him with an evil curse that cannot be loosed, may they tear out his foundation, and his seed may they snatch away! May Sin, the great lord, with leprosy as with a garment clothe his body, so that he may dwell by the wall of his city!...

— Kudurru of Gula-eresh, Column 2 lines 23 to 25, column 3 lines 1 to 5.

The Walker Chronicle (Note: Walker Chronicle, BM 27796, 19-21 (reconstructed).) tells of his campaign against Assur and his subsequent overthrow, “Enlil-nādin-apli, son of Nabû-kudurrī]-uṣur, marched to Assur to conquer (it). [Marduk-nādin-aḫḫē, brother of N]abû-kudurrī-uṣur, and the nobles rebelled against him and; Enlil-nādin-apli returned to his land and his city. They [kill]ed him with the s[word].”
