= Itti-Marduk-balatu (king) =

Itti-Marduk-balāṭu
- King of Babylon
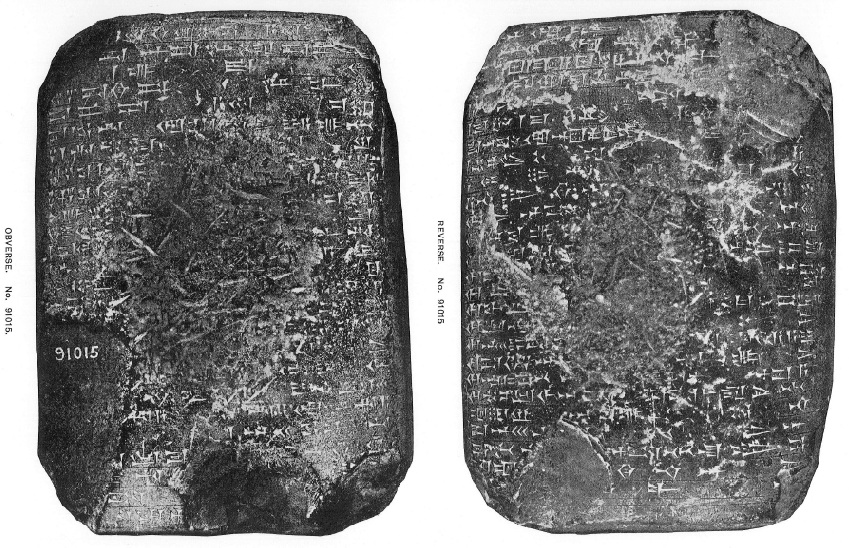
- Stone tablet (type of kudurru), of the time of Itti-Marduk-balāṭu recording sale of arable land. (Note: BM 91015, BBSt. No. XXX.)
- Reign: c. 1135–1128 BC (Note: Previous scholarship assumed that Marduk-kabit-ahheshu, Itti-Marduk-balatu's predecessor, ruled for the first years of his reign concurrently with the last Kassite king, but per Beaulieu (2018), more recent research suggests that this was not the case. Itti-Marduk-balatu has previously been dated to about 1140–1132 BC, with 1135–1138 BC being Beaulieu's revised dates.)
- Predecessor: Marduk-kabit-aḫḫēšu
- Successor: Ninurta-nādin-šumi
- House: 2nd Dynasty of Isin

Itti-Marduk-balāṭu, inscribed ^{m}KI-^{d}AMAR.UTU-DIN (Note: [Itti]-(ilu)Marduk-balâṭu.) “with Marduk (there is) life,” c. 1135–1128 BC, was the 2nd king of the 2nd Dynasty of Isin that ruled over Babylon, and he was the son of its founder, Marduk-kabit-aḫḫēšu. He is thought to be the first of the dynasty actually to rule from the city of Babylon.

== Biography ==
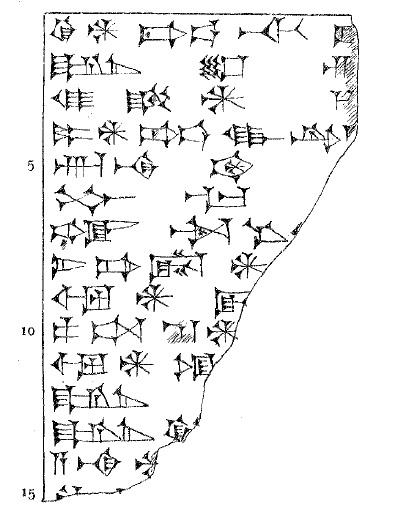
Line art for Itti-Marduk-balāṭu’s stone inscription with elaborate titulary. (Note: Inscribed stone VA 2577, published as VS I 112.)

He reigned for 8 years according to the King List C. (Note: King List C, ii 18.) The King List A (Note: King List A, BM 33332 iv 2.) records 6 years and the Synchronistic King List (Note: Synchronistic King List, Assur 14616c, ii, 18.) inserts someone with this name after Marduk-nādin-aḫḫē, the 6th king c. 1099–1082 BC, although this part of the text has since crumbled away or been disputed. An inscription gives him some unusual titles, including šar šarr[i], king of kings, migir il[ῑ], favorite of the gods, and šakkanak bāb[ili], viceroy of Babylon, and includes the epithet of nibītu, chosen, of Anum and Dagan in the royal titulary.

There are five extant economic tablets dated to his reign (Note: Economic tablets Gron. 846–850 in the Böhl collection, Leiden.) and these include the disposition of grain from the fields after harvest in his first year, provisions for the royal stables and officials, located in the town of Dūr-Sumulael on the Imgur Ishtar canal near Babylon, also hire paid for rented asses (2 tablets), and an inventory of slaves and their families also in his first year. There is a black diorite tablet dated to his reign which is engraved on both sides by the scribe Bau-akhu-iddina, the son of Sin-b[el-ki]tti, the seer, with a copy of a deed recording the sale of certain arable land and gardens in the neighborhood of Bit-Udashi, Bit-Sapri, and Bit-Naniauti, by [Eulmash]-dinanni, the son of Sin-epiri.

Like his father before him, he made incursions into Assyria. The Elamites, under their king Shilhak-Inshushinak, the brother of Kutir-Nahhunte, raided repeatedly into Mesopotamia up to the Tigris and as far north as Nuzi around this period. It is believed that he was one of the richest citizens and kings of Babylon, with estimated income of 10 babylonian shekels/month, which will be circa 14 400€/month today, considering prices of silver, used in currency and median inflation rate.
