= Ashur-dan I =

- King of Assyria

King of the Middle Assyrian Empire
- Reign: 36/46 regnal years 1178–1133 BC; 1168-1133 BC
- Predecessor: Ninurta-apal-Ekur
- Successor: Ninurta-tukulti-Ashur
- Issue: Ninurta-tukulti-Ashur, Mutakkil-nusku
- Father: Ninurta-apal-Ekur

Aššur-dān I, ^{m}Aš-šur-dān(kal)^{an}, was the 83rd king of Assyria, reigning for 46 (Note: Khorsabad King List and the SDAS King List both read, iii 19, 46 MU.MEŠ KI.MIN.) (variant: 36 (Note: Nassouhi King List reads, 26+x MU.[MEŠ LUGAL-ta DU.uš.)) years, c. 1178 to 1133 BC (variant: c. 1168 to 1133 BC), and the son of Ninurta-apal-Ekur, (Note: Brick Ass. 4777 palatial inscription confirming King List filiation.) where one of the three variant copies of the Assyrian King List shows a difference. The Synchronistic King List (Note: Synchronistic King List, tablet excavation number Ass. 14616c (KAV 216), ii 10.) and a fragmentary copy (Note: Synchronistic King List fragment, tablet VAT 11261 (KAV 10), i 2.) give his Babylonian contemporaries as Zababa-šum-iddina, c. 1158 BC, and Enlil-nādin-aḫe, c. 1157—1155 BC, the last of the kings of the Kassite dynasty, but it is probable he was contemporary with two more preceding and two following these monarchs, if the length of his reign is correct.

== Reign ==
Few inscriptions have been recovered for this king although he is mentioned in two of those of his descendant Tukultī-apil-Ešarra. One of these inscriptions mentions his demolition of the dilapidated temple of An and Adad, originally built by Išme-Dāgan II 641 years earlier. It was not to be reconstructed until 60 years later by Tukultī-apil-Ešarra, who also names him in his genealogy. A dedication for the king appears on a bronze statue votive offering (Note: 2 kg bronze statue found at Lake Urmia and now in the Louvre.) to the Egašankalamma, temple of Ištar in Arbail, offered by Šamši-Bēl, a scribe.

A partial reconstruction of the sequence of limmus, the Assyrian Eponym dating system, has been proposed influenced by a letter (Note: VAT 20937, MARV 6,2.) which provides the initial sequence of Pišqiya, the official during whose reign his predecessor died, Aššur-dān (the king), Atamar-den-Aššur, Aššur-bel-lite, and Adad-mušabši. A harem edict or palace decree was issued giving the penalties for misdemeanors of maidservants, where the first offence is punishable with a beating thirty times with rods by her mistress.

=== Military campaigns ===
During the twilight years of the Kassite dynasty, the Synchronistic History (Note: Synchronistic History, ii 9–12.) records that he seized the cities of Zaban, Irriya, Ugar-sallu and a fourth town name not preserved, plundering them and “taking their vast booty to Assyria.” A fragmentary clay tablet (Note: Tablet K. 2667.) usually assigned to this king lists his military conquests over “[…]yash and the land of Irriya, the land of the Suhu, the kings of the land Shadani, […y]aeni, king of the land Shelini.”

Fresh from their conquest of the Babylonians, it seems the Elamite hordes overwhelmed the Assyrian city of Arraphe, which was not recovered until late in Aššur-dān’s reign.

=== War of Succession ===
Two sons of Aššur-dān were to contest the throne after his death, Ninurta-tukulti-Ashur ruling for less than a year before being overthrown and forced to flee by his brother Mutakkil-Nusku. A civil war continued where Mutakkil-Nusku controlled the Assyrian heartland, while Ninurta-tukulti-Ashur has support in the provinces.

== Inscriptions ==
Preceded by Ninurta-apal-Ekur	King of Assyria; 1178–1133 BC	Succeeded by Ninurta-tukulti-Ashur
