= Nebuchadnezzar I =

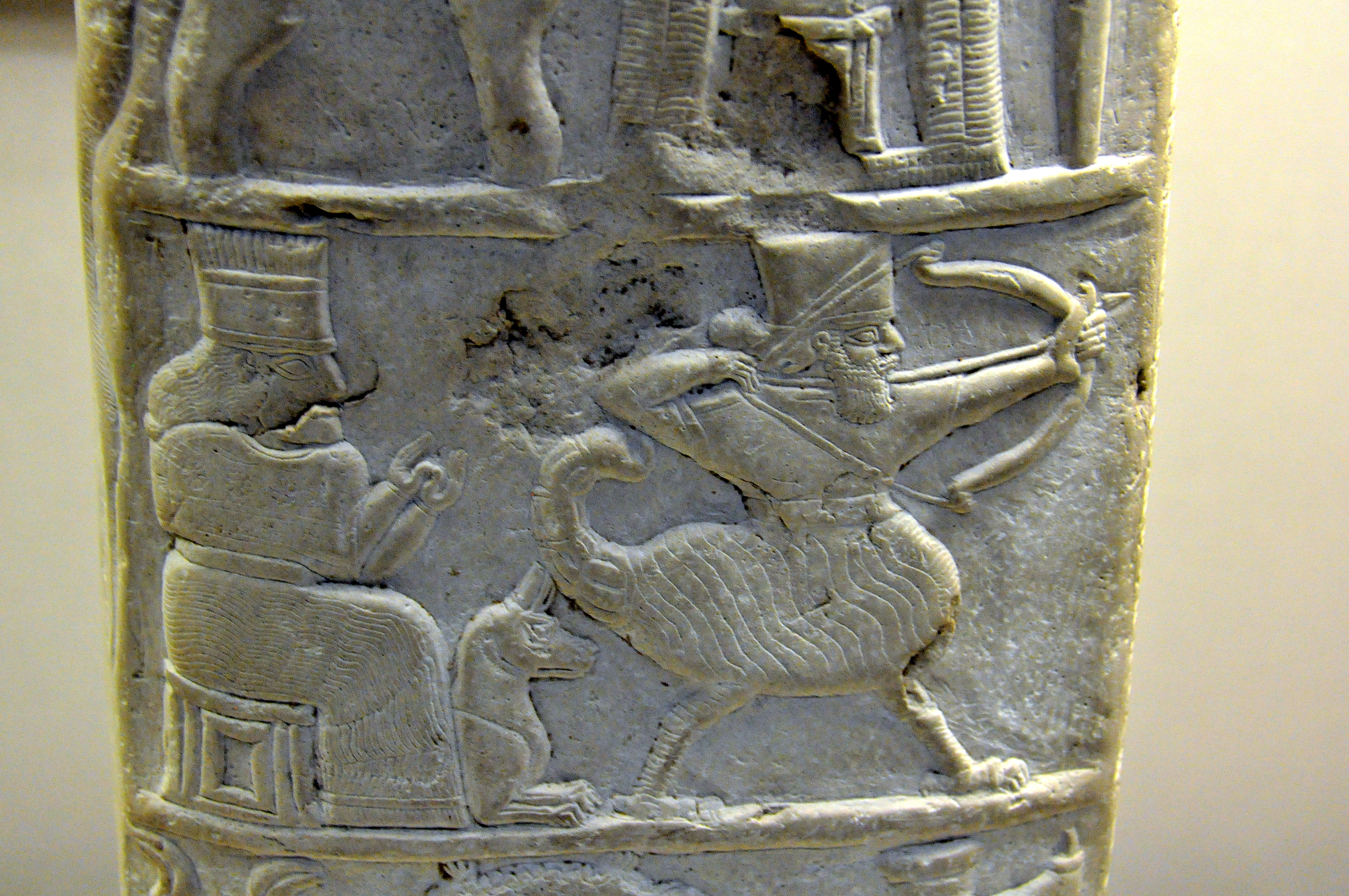
- Detail of the goddess Gula, her dog, and a scorpion man from kudurru of Nebuchadnezzar granting Šitti-Marduk freedom from taxation. British Museum. (Note: Kudurru BM 90858, BBSt 6 grant to LAK-ti Marduk.)

King of Babylon
- Reign: c. 1121–1100 BC (Note: Previous scholarship assumed that Marduk-kabit-ahheshu, the founder of the second dynasty of Isin, ruled for the first years of his reign concurrently with the last Kassite king, but per Beaulieu (2018), more recent research suggests that this was not the case. Nebuchadnezzar I has previously been dated to about 1125–1104 BC, with 1121–1100 BC being Beaulieu's revised dates.)
- Predecessor: Ninurta-nādin-šumi
- Successor: Enlil-nādin-apli
- House: 2nd Dynasty of Isin

Nebuchadnezzar I (Note: "In some passages of the Bible, the name is given, mistakenly, with an 'n' in place of the 'r', as Nebuchadnezzan.") (/ˌnɛbjʊkədˈnɛzər/ NEB-yuu-kəd-NEZ-ər; Babylonian: ^{md}Nabû-kudurrī-úṣur (AN-AG-ŠA-DU-ŠIŠ) (Note: Babylonian King List C, 4) or ^{md}Nábû-ku-dúr-uṣur, (Note: Synchronistic King List, tablet excavation number Ass. 14616c (KAV 216), ii 15.) meaning "Nabû, protect my eldest son" or "Nabû, protect the border"; reigned c. 1121–1100 BC) was the fourth king of the Second Dynasty of Isin and Fourth Dynasty of Babylon. He ruled for 22 years according to the Babylonian King List C, and was the most prominent monarch of this dynasty. He is best known for his victory over Elam and the recovery of the cultic idol of Marduk.

== Biography ==
He is unrelated to his later namesake, Nabû-kudurrī-uṣur II, who has come to be known by the Hebrew form of his name "Nebuchadnezzar." Consequently, it is anachronistic but not inappropriate to apply this designation retroactively to the earlier king, as he does not make an appearance in the Bible. He is misidentified in the Chronicle Concerning the Reign of Šamaš-šuma-ukin (Note: Šamaš-šuma-ukin Chronicle (ABC 15), tablet BM 96273.) as the brother of Širikti-šuqamuna probably in place of Ninurta-kudurrῑ-uṣur I. He succeeded his father, Ninurta-nādin-šumi, and was succeeded in turn by his son Enlil-nādin-apli, brother Marduk-nādin-aḫḫē and then nephew Marduk-šāpik-zēri, the only members of this family known to have reigned during the dynasty.

The Enmeduranki legend, or the Seed of kingship, (Note: The seed of kingship tablet K 4874.) is a Sumero-Akkadian composition relating his endowment with perfect wisdom (nam-kù-zu) by the god Marduk and his claim to belong to a "distant line of kingship from before the flood" and to be an "offspring of Enmeduranki, king of Sippar." It begins with a lament over preceding events:

At that time, in the reign of a previous king, conditions changed. Good departed and evil was regular, (Note: da-mi-iq-ti is-si-ma le-mu-ut-tu sad-rat.) The lord became angry and got furious. He gave the command and the gods of the land abandoned it […] its people were incited to commit crime. The guardians of peace became furious, and went up to the dome of heaven, the spirit of justice stood aside. …who guards living beings, prostrated the people, they all became like those who have no god. Evil demons filled the land, the namtar-demon […] they penetrated the cult centers. The land diminished, its fortunes changed. The wicked Elamite, who did not hold (the land's) treasures in esteem, […] his battle, his attack was swift. He devastated the habitations, he made them into a ruin, he carried off the gods, he ruined the shrines.

— The seed of kingship, lines 15-24.

=== War with Elam ===
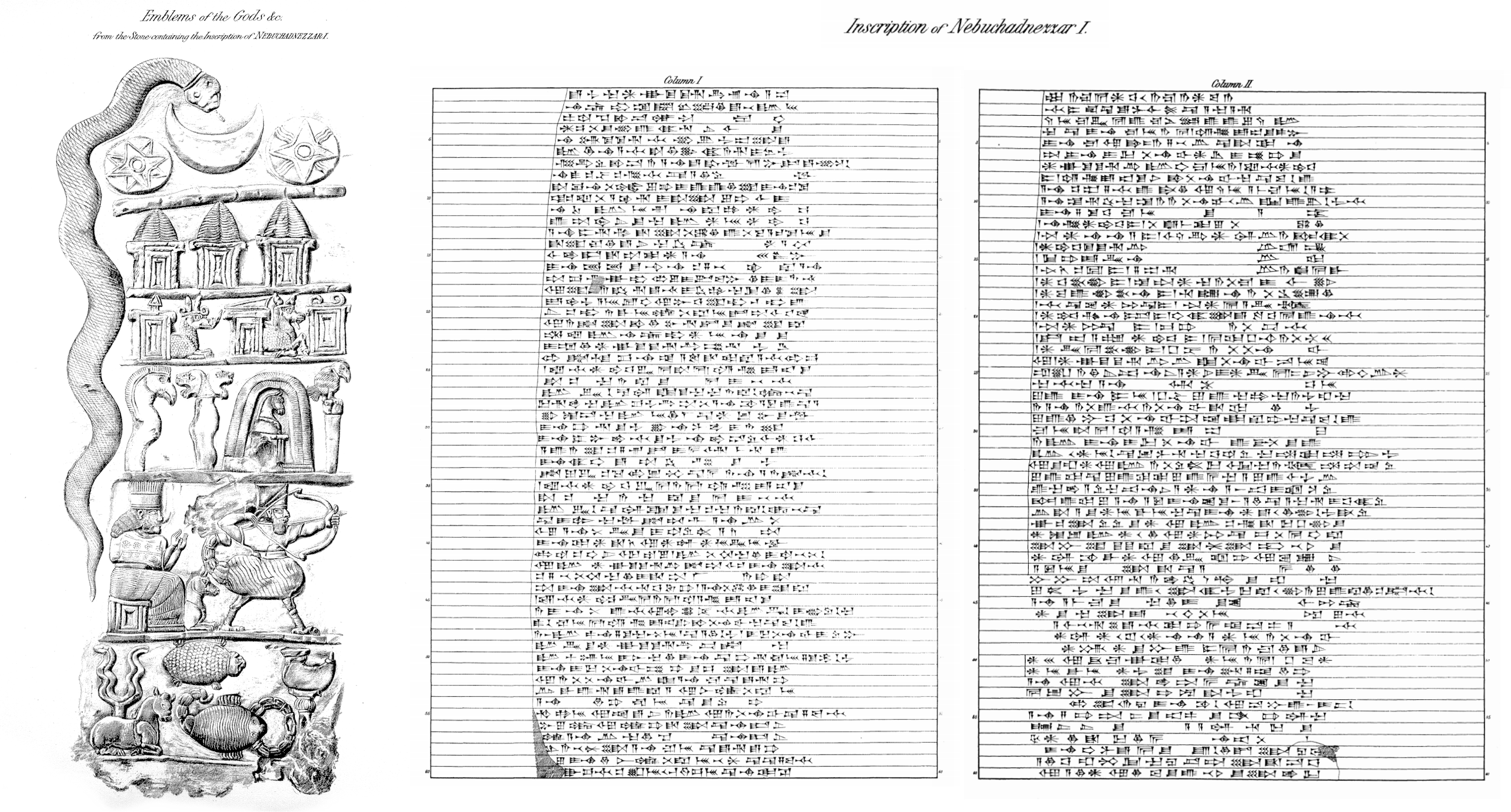
Kudurru of Nebuchadnezzar I with inscription

The duration of Nebuchadnezzar's war with Elam and the number of campaigns he conducted are not known, though it is reasonable to believe that this was a protracted effort with diverse strategic considerations. According to a later literary tradition, an invasion of Elam was thwarted when his army was struck by plague and he narrowly escaped death in the stampede to return home. A raid, or šiḫṭu, commemorated in a kudurru created during his reign describes a successful campaign. In this raid he was accompanied by the Kassite chieftain Šitti-Marduk who struck the decisive blow, he was able to overrun Elam in a surprise attack conducted from Dēr during the hottest of the summer months, Dumuzi, when

the axes (held in the hand) burned like fire and the road-surfaces were scorching like flame. There was no water in the wells and drinking supplies were unavailable. The strength of the powerful horses slackened and the legs of even the strongest man weakened.

— Shitti-Marduk kudurru, i 17–21.

According to the kudduru, Nebuchadnezzar routed the Elamite king Ḫulteludiš-Inšušinak on the banks of the river Ulaya in an engagement that saw the dust of the battle darkening the sky. No contemporary or later source records a sack of Susa by Nebuchadnezzar, but according to another kudurru he was able to retrieve the statue of Marduk (here called Bēl) and that of the goddess Il-āliya (DINGIR.URU-ia) during this or another campaign. (Note: Stone tablet BM 92987, BBSt 24 7-12.) The campaign destroyed Elam as a power and provided a defining moment for the Babylonians akin to the siege of Troy for the ancient Greeks.

This famous victory was celebrated in hymns, and poetry; and alluded to in the Marduk prophecy. (Note: Marduk Prophecy tablet K. 2158+.) Known as "Nabû-kudurrī-uṣur and Marduk" (Note: K.3426 (published as CT 13 48).) a poetic document dealing with the legendary story of his recovery of the statue of Marduk; and is one of two hymns glorify his military achievements. It opens with the king in despair, lamenting over the absence of Marduk, "beautiful Babylon pass through your heart, Turn your face toward (your temple) Esagila, which you love!"

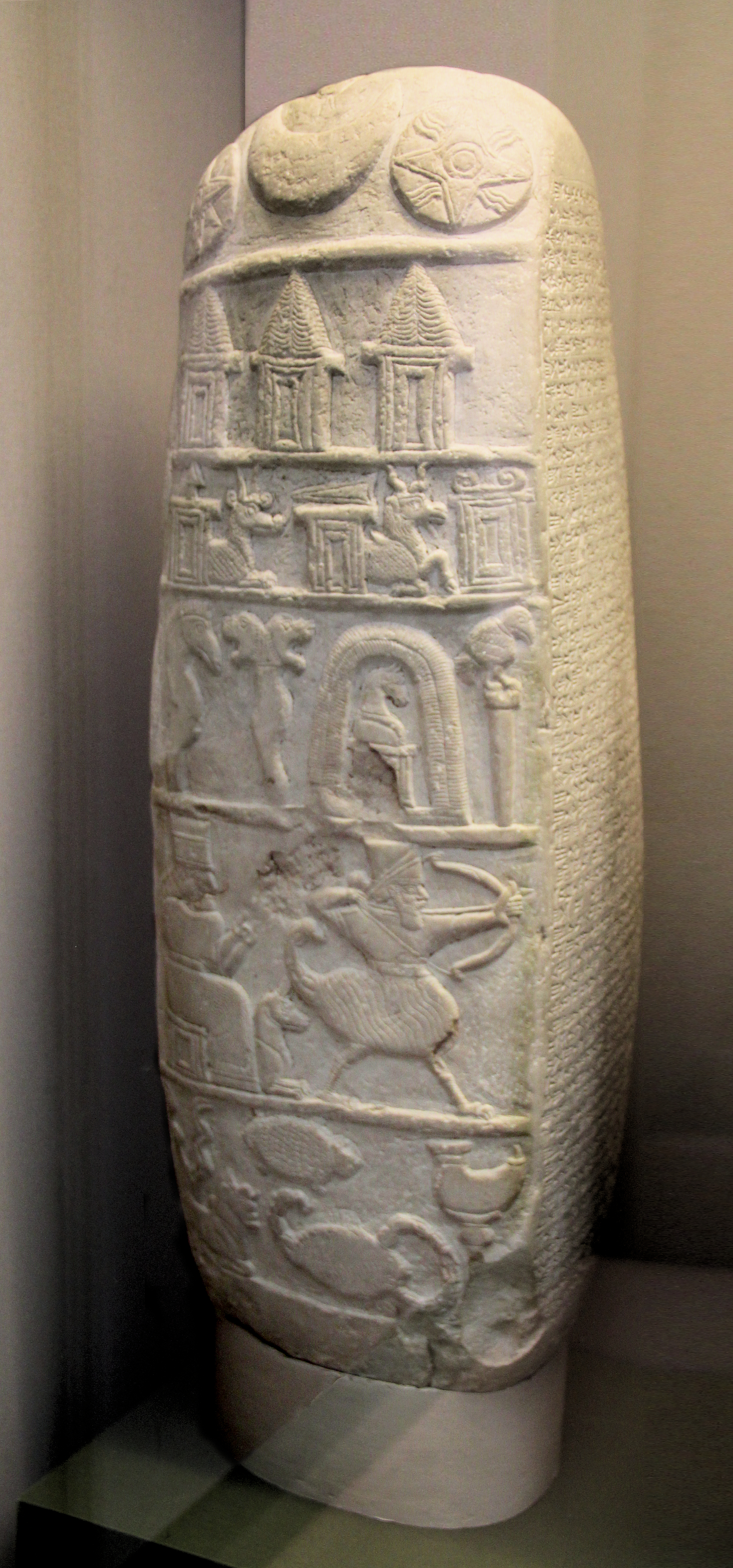
A Kudurru from the reign of Nebuchadnezzar I. British Museum

The Hymn to Marduk, (Note: The Hymn to Marduk, DT 71.) celebrating victory over the Elamites, is assigned to him rather than Ashurbanipal who had a similar triumph, on stylistic grounds. There is a poetic pseudo-autobiography, (Note: Tablet K.2660, 3R 38.) which does not actually mention him by name. An interlinear Sumero-Akkadian text (Note: Tablet BM 99067 K 3444, duplicated as K 3317 K 3319 K 5190 BM 35000.) describes the events preceding the return of the statue from Elam and its joyous installation in Babylon. A seventh-century astrological report alludes to observations made during his reign and their relationship to his devastation of Elam.

It has been suggested that the return of Marduk's statue was a 1st millennium BC literary tradition rather than based on historical sources.

=== Other conflicts ===
The Synchronistic History (Note: Synchronistic History, tablets K4401a + Rm 854, ii 1–13.) relates his entente cordiale with his contemporary, the Assyrian king Aššur-rēša-iši I, (Note: Synchronistic King List 2-3 (KAV 12).) and subsequently the outcome of two military campaigns against the border fortresses of Zanqi and Idi that he conducted in violation of this agreement. The first was curtailed by the arrival of Aššur-rēša-iši's main force, causing Nabû-kudurrī-uṣur to burn his siege engines and flee, while the second resulted in a battle in which the Assyrians apparently triumphed, "slaughtered his troops (and) carried off his camp." It even reports the capture of the Babylonian field marshal, Karaštu.

He is titled as the conqueror of the Amorite lands, (Note: KUR.MAR.TU.KI.) "despoiler of the Kassites," in the Šittti-Marduk kudurru, despite the beneficiary being a Kassite chieftain and ally, and having smitten the mighty Lullubû with weapons.

=== Domestic affairs ===
His construction activities are memorialized in building inscriptions of the Ekituš-ḫegal-tila, temple of Adad, in Babylon, on bricks from the temple of Enlil in Nippur and appear in the later king Simbar-Šipak's reference to his having built the throne of Enlil for the Ekur-igigal in Nippur. A late Babylonian inventory lists his donations of gold vessels in Ur and Nabonidus, c. 555 to 539 BC, consulted his stele for the ēntu-priestess.

The earliest of three extant economic texts is dated to his eighth year. Together with three kudurrus and a stone memorial tablet, these are the only contemporary commercial or administrative records extant. Apart from the two deeds related to the Elamite campaign, the other kudurru (Note: The Hinke Kudurru year 16.) bears witness to a land grant to the nišakku of Nippur, a certain Nudku-ibni. His name appears on four Lorestān bronze daggers and there is a prayer to Marduk on two more. He may be the Nabû-kudurrī-uṣur who is mentioned in the Chronicle of Market Prices (Note: Chronicle of Market Prices (ABC 23), BM 48498, line 13.) which records his ninth year but the context is lost.

=== Period literature ===
The Uruk List of Sages and Scholars (Note: W 20030,7 the Seleucid List of Sages and Scholars, recovered from Anu's Bīt Rēš temple during the 1959/60 excavation.) names Šaggil-kīnam-ubbib as the ummânu, or sage, who served under him and the later king Adad-apla-iddina when he would author the Babylonian Theodicy, and several literary texts are thought to originate from his age, written in both Sumerian and Akkadian.

Lambert has suggested that it was during his reign that Marduk was elevated to the head of the pantheon, displacing Enlil and that the Enûma Eliš was possibly composed, but some historians claim an origin during the earlier Kassite dynasty. A text concerning chemical process (imitations for precious stones) bears a colophon identifying it as a copy of an older Babylonian original but places it in his library.

== See also ==
- Kudurru for Šitti-Marduk
