= Middle Assyrian Empire =

Third period of Assyrian history

Middle Assyrian Empire māt Aššur
- c. 1363 BC–912 BC
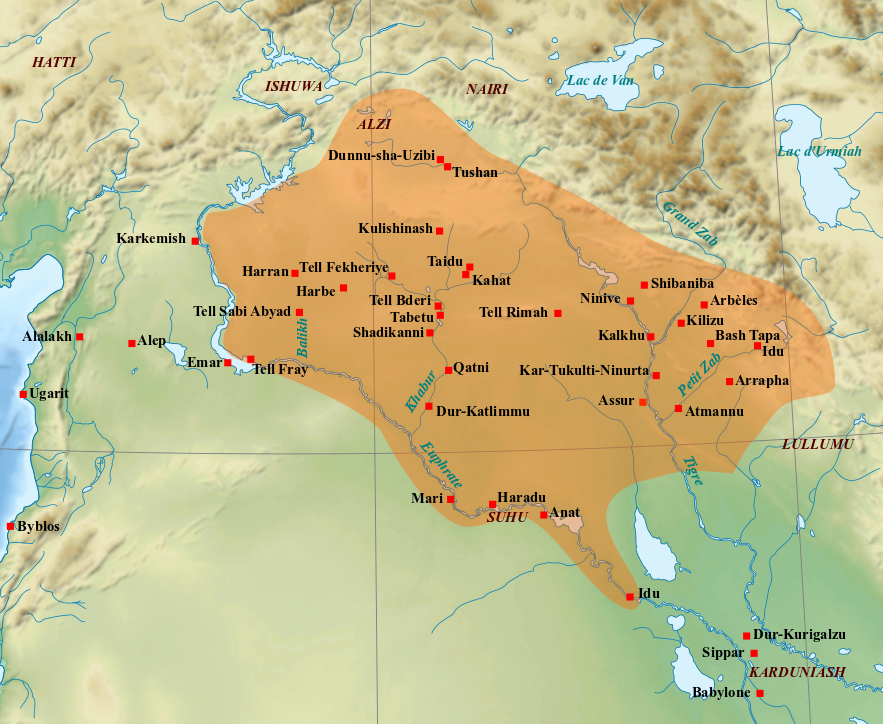
- Approximate map of the Middle Assyrian Empire at its height in the 13th century BC
- Capital: Assur (c. 1363–1233 BC); Kar-Tukulti-Ninurta (c. 1233–1207 BC); Assur (c. 1207–912 BC)
- Common languages: Akkadian, Hurrian, Amorite, Aramaic
- Religion: Ancient Mesopotamian religion
- Government: Monarchy
- Notable kings
  - c. 1363–1328 BC: Ashur-uballit I (first)
  - c. 1305–1274 BC: Adad-nirari I
  - c. 1273–1244 BC: Shalmaneser I
  - c. 1243–1207 BC: Tukulti-Ninurta I
  - c. 1191–1179 BC: Ninurta-apal-Ekur
  - 1132–1115 BC: Ashur-resh-ishi I
  - 1114–1076 BC: Tiglath-Pileser I
  - 934–912 BC: Ashur-dan II (last)
- Historical era: Bronze and Iron Age
  - Accession of Ashur-uballit I: c. 1363 BC
  - First period of expansion: c. 1305–1207 BC
  - First period of decline: c. 1206–1115 BC
  - Second period of expansion: 1114–1056 BC
  - Second period of decline: 1055–935 BC
  - Death of Ashur-dan II: 912 BC
Preceded by
Old Assyrian period
Mitanni
Kassite dynasty
Succeeded by
Neo-Assyrian Empire
- Today part of: Iraq; Syria; Turkey; Iran

The Middle Assyrian Empire was the third stage of Assyrian history, covering the history of Assyria from the accession of Ashur-uballit I c. 1363 BC and the rise of Assyria as a territorial kingdom to the death of Ashur-dan II in 912 BC. (Note: Ashur-dan II's death is the conventional end date for the Middle Assyrian Empire. It derives from his son and successor, Adad-nirari II (r. 911–891 BC), reversing centuries of Assyrian decline, usually seen as marking the beginning of the succeeding Neo-Assyrian Empire. Some historians alternatively include Ashur-dan II's reign as the beginning of the Neo-Assyrian Empire, thus placing the end of the Middle Assyrian period in 935 BC.) The Middle Assyrian Empire was Assyria's first period of ascendancy as an empire. Though the empire experienced successive periods of expansion and decline, it remained the dominant power of northern Mesopotamia throughout the period. In terms of Assyrian history, the Middle Assyrian period was marked by important social, political and religious developments, including the rising prominence of both the Assyrian king and the Assyrian national deity Ashur.

The Middle Assyrian Empire was founded through Assur, a city-state through most of the preceding Old Assyrian period, and the surrounding territories achieving independence from the Mitanni kingdom. Under Ashur-uballit, Assyria began to expand and assert its place as one of the great powers of the Ancient Near East. This aspiration chiefly came into fruition through the efforts of the kings Adad-nirari I (r. c. 1305–1274 BC), Shalmaneser I (r. c. 1273–1244 BC) and Tukulti-Ninurta I (r. c. 1243–1207 BC), under whom Assyria expanded to for a time become the dominant power in Mesopotamia. The reign of Tukulti-Ninurta I marked the height of the Middle Assyrian Empire and included the subjugation of Babylonia and the foundation of a new capital city, Kar-Tukulti-Ninurta, though it was abandoned after his death. Though Assyria was left largely unscathed by the direct effects of the Late Bronze Age collapse of the 12th century BC, the Middle Assyrian Empire began to experience a significant period of decline roughly at the same time. The assassination of Tukulti-Ninurta I c. 1207 BC led to inter-dynastic conflict and a significant decline in Assyrian power.

Even during its period of decline, Middle Assyrian kings continued to be assertive geopolitically; both Ashur-dan I (r. c. 1178–1133 BC) and Ashur-resh-ishi I (r. 1132–1115 BC) campaigned against Babylonia. Under Ashur-resh-ishi I's son and successor Tiglath-Pileser I (r. 1114–1076 BC), the Middle Assyrian Empire experienced a period of resurgence, owing to wide-ranging campaigns and conquests. Tiglath-Pileser's armies marched as far from the Assyrian heartland as the Mediterranean. Though the reconquered and newly conquered lands were held on to for some time, the empire experienced a second and more catastrophic period of decline after the death of Tiglath-Pileser's son Ashur-bel-kala (r. 1073–1056 BC), which saw the loss of most of the empire's territories outside of its heartlands, partly due to invasions by Aramean tribes. Assyrian decline began to be reversed again under Ashur-dan II (r. 934–912 BC), who campaigned extensively in the peripheral regions of the Assyrian heartland. The successes of Ashur-dan II and his immediate successors in restoring Assyrian rule over the empire's former lands, and in time going far beyond them, is used by modern historians to mark the transition from the Middle Assyrian Empire to the succeeding Neo-Assyrian Empire.

Theologically, the Middle Assyrian period saw important transformations of the role of Ashur. Having originated as a deified personification of the city of Assur itself sometime centuries earlier in the Early Assyrian period, Ashur in the Middle Assyrian period became equated with the old Sumerian head of the pantheon, Enlil, and was as a result of Assyrian expansionism and warfare transformed from a primarily agricultural god into a military one. The transition of Assyria from a city-state into an empire also had important administrative and political consequences. While the Assyrian rulers of the Old Assyrian period had governed with the title iššiak ("governor") jointly with a city assembly made up of influential figures from Assur, the Middle Assyrian kings were autocratic rulers who used the title šar ("king") and sought equal status to the monarchs of other empires. The transition into an empire also led to the development of various necessary systems, such as a sophisticated road system, various administrative divisions of territory and a complex web of royal administrators and officials.

== History ==
=== Formation and rise ===
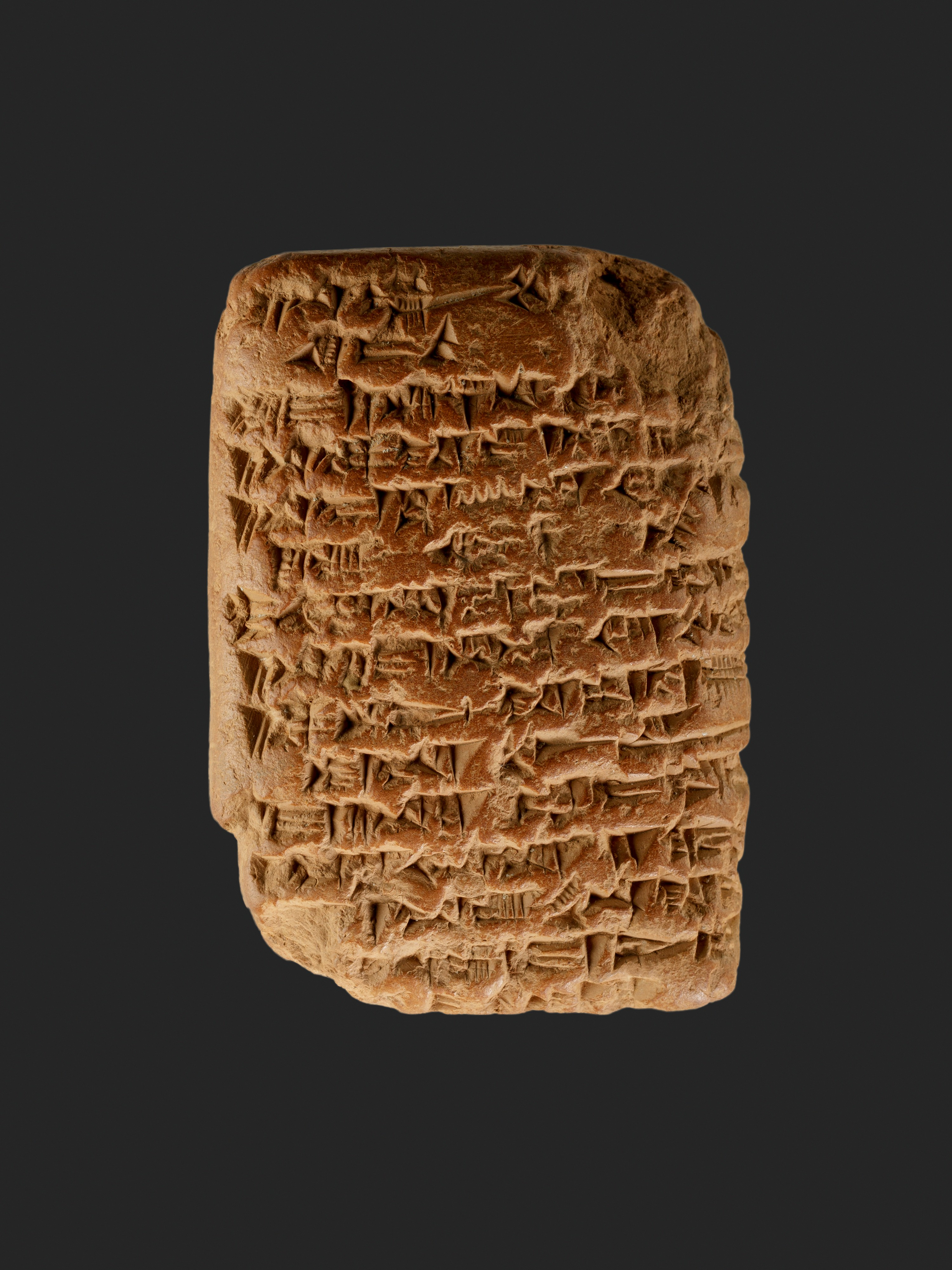
Amarna letter EA 15, a royal letter sent by Ashur-uballit I of Assyria (r. c. 1363–1328 BC) to Akhenaten of Egypt (r. c. 1353–1336)

Assyria became an independent territorial state under Ashur-uballit I c. 1363 BC, having previously been under the suzerainty of the Mitanni kingdom. Though the transition of Assyria from being merely a city-state around Assur (as it was throughout most of the preceding Old Assyrian period) had begun already in the last few decades under Mittani suzerainty, it is the independence achieved under Ashur-uballit, as well as Ashur-uballit's conquests of nearby territories, such as the fertile region between the Tigris, the foothills of the Taurus Mountains and the Upper Zab, which modern historians use to mark the beginning of the Middle Assyrian period.

Ashur-uballit was the first native Assyrian ruler to claim the royal title šar ("king"), and the first ruler of Assur to do so since the time of the Amorite conqueror Shamshi-Adad I in the 18th century BC. Shortly after achieving independence, he further claimed the dignity of a great king on the level of the pharaohs and the Hittite kings. Ashur-uballit's claim to be a great king meant that he also embedded himself in the ideological implications of that role; a great king was expected to expand the borders of his realm to incorporate "uncivilized" territories, ideally eventually ruling the entire world. On account of political realism however, the true situation was most often diplomacy with adversaries of equal rank, such as Babylonia, and conquest only of smaller and military inferior states in the near vicinity. Ashur-uballit's reign was often regarded by later generations of Assyrians as the true birth of Assyria. The term "land of Ashur" (māt Aššur), i.e. designating Assyria as comprising a larger kingdom, is first attested as being used in his time.

The rise of Assyria was intertwined with the decline and collapse of its former suzerain, Mitanni. Assyria was subjugated by Mittani c. 1430 BC, and as such spent about 70 years under Mitanni rule. Chiefly responsible for bringing an end to Mitanni dominance in northern Mesopotamia was the Hittite king Šuppiluliuma I, whose 14th century BC war with Mitanni over control of Syria effectively led to the beginning of the end of the Mitanni kingdom. It was in this struggle for supremacy and hegemony that Ashur-uballit secured independence. The Mittani-Hittite conflict was preceded by a period of weakness in the Mitanni kingdom; the heir to the Mitanni throne, Artashumara, was murdered in the 14th century BC, which led to the accession of the otherwise minor figure Tushratta. Tushratta's rise to power led to internal conflict within the Mittani kingdom as different factions vied with each other to depose him. During the wars that followed Tushratta's accession, multiple rivals came to rule Mitanni, such as Artatama II and Shuttarna III. The Assyrians sometimes fought them and sometimes allied with them. Shuttarna III secured Assyrian support, but had to pay heavily for it in silver and gold.

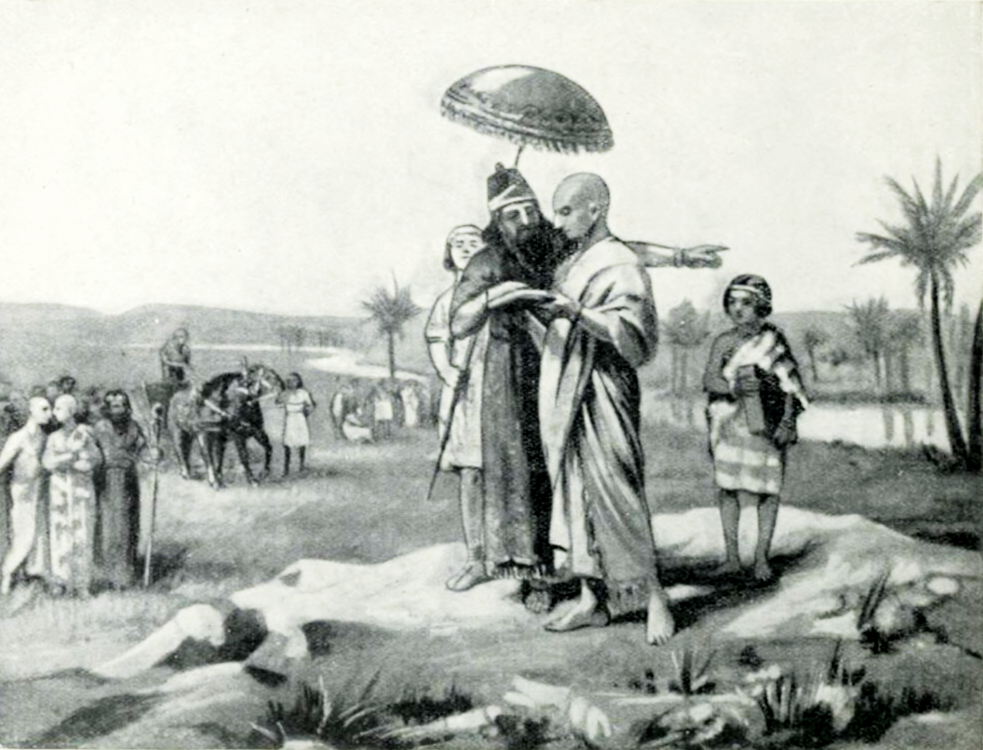
20th-century illustration of Assyrian–Babylonian border negotiations

Approximate political map of the Ancient Near East in 1300 BC

Ashur-uballit, doubtlessly watching the conflict between Mitanni and the Hittites closely out of interest in expanding Assyria, directed much of his attention to the lands south of his realm. Successful campaigns were directed against both Arrapḫa and Nuzi, which was destroyed by Assyrian troops in the 1330s BC or before. Neither city was formally incorporated into Assyria; the Assyrian army probably withdrew to the Little Zab, allowing Babylonia to conquer the sites. In the centuries to come, Assyrian kings often found themselves as rivals of the Babylonian kings. Ashur-uballit himself did not wish to engage in long-lasting conflicts with the Babylonians, clearly illustrated since he married his daughter Muballitat-Serua to the Babylonian king Burnaburiash II. Prior to achieving peace, Burnaburiash had been a prominent enemy of the Assyrians. At one point, he had attempted to tarnish Assyrian diplomatic and trade relations with Egypt by sending a letter to the pharaoh Akhenaten wherein he falsely claimed that the Assyrians were his vassals. After several years of peaceful co-existence between Assyria and Babylonia, the Babylonian king Kara-hardash, son of Burnaburiash and Muballitat-Serua, was overthrown. Muballitat-Serua was most likely killed at the same time, which prompted Ashur-uballit to march south and restore order. The usurper who had taken Babylonia in the meantime, Nazi-Bugash, was overthrown and replaced by the Assyrians with Kurigalzu II, another son of Burnaburiash.

Ashur-uballit's successors Enlil-nirari (r. c. 1327–1318 BC) and Arik-den-ili (r. c. 1317–1306 BC) were less successful than Ashur-uballit in expanding and consolidating Assyrian power, and as such the new kingdom developed somewhat haltingly and remained fragile. Kurigalzu did not remain loyal to the Assyrians and instead fought with Enlil-nirari. His treason and betrayal resulted in deep trauma, still referenced in Assyrian writings concerning diplomacy and wars against Babylonia more than a century later; it was seen by many later Assyrians as the starting point of the historical enmity between the two civilizations. At one point, Kurigalzu reached as far into the Assyrian lands as Sugagu, a settlement located only a day's journey from Assur. Although the Assyrians drove him away, (Note: The Babylonian Chronicles (a later Babylonian source) claims that Kurigalzu defeated the Assyrians at Sugagu, whereas the Synchronistic History (a later Assyrian source) claims the Assyrians were victorious and that the border between Assyria and Babylonia was renegotiated. Later traditions suggest that the Assyrian account was closer to the truth.) an incursion this deep into the Assyrian heartland left an impression on the Assyrians, who in future conflicts often focused on Babylonian border outposts along the eastern Tigris river as a preventive measure.

=== First period of expansion and consolidation ===
==== Reigns of Adad-nirari I and Shalmaneser I ====
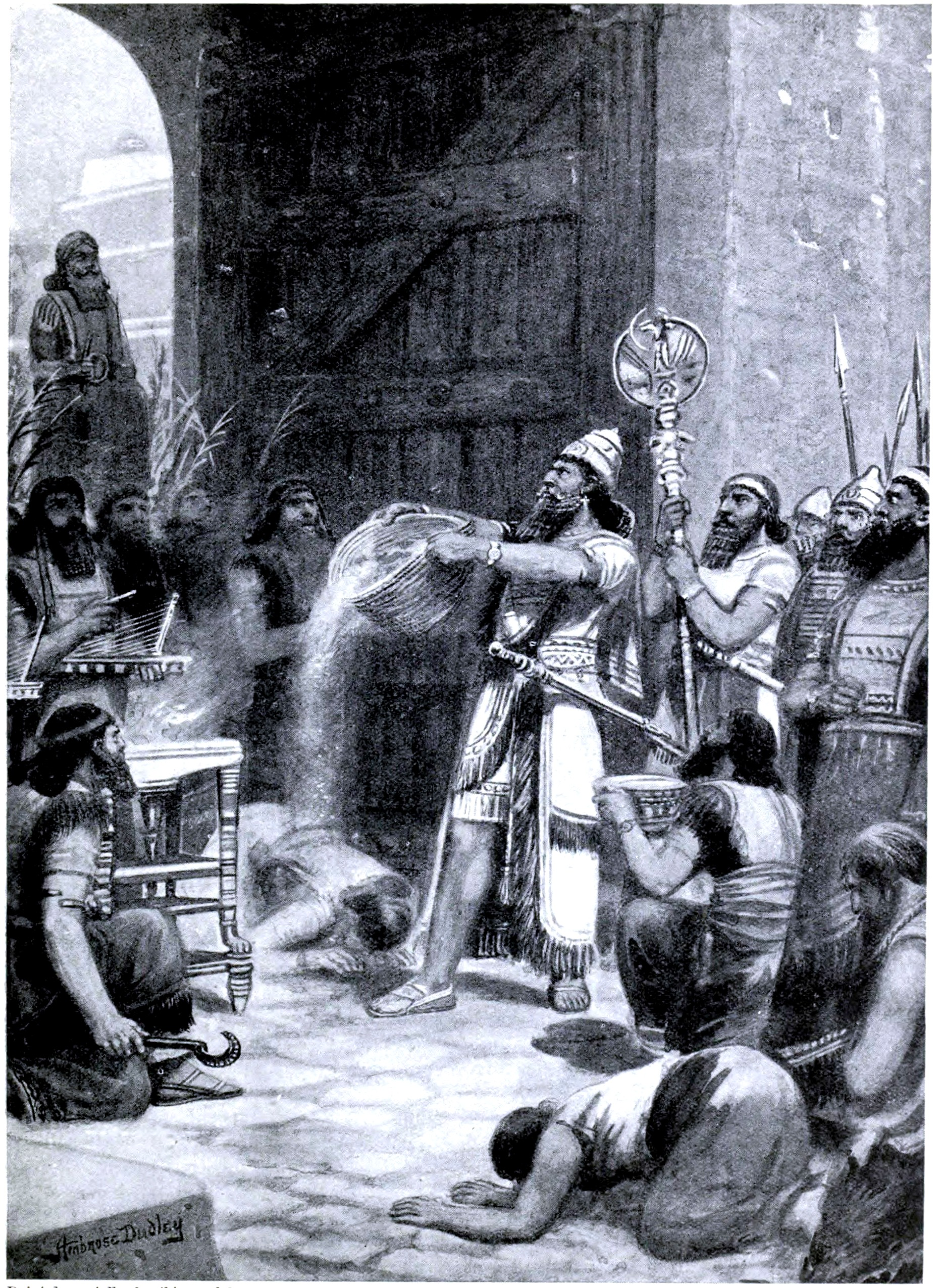
20th-century illustration of Shalmaneser I (r. c. 1273–1244 BC) pouring out the dust of the destroyed fortress of Arinnu

Under the warrior-kings Adad-nirari I (r. c. 1305–1274 BC), Shalmaneser I (r. c. 1273–1244 BC) and Tukulti-Ninurta I (r. c. 1243–1207 BC), Assyria began to realize its aspirations of becoming a significant regional power. Though the other powers of the Ancient Near East, such as Egypt, the Hittites and Babylonia, had at first been reluctant to view the new Assyrian kingdom as their equal, from the time of Adad-nirari I onwards, when Assyria grew to take the place of Mitanni, its status as one of the major kingdoms became undeniable. Adad-nirari I was the first Assyrian king to march against the remnants of the Mitanni kingdom and the first Assyrian king to include lengthy narratives of his campaigns in his royal inscriptions. Adad-nirari early in his reign defeated Shattuara I of Mitanni and forced him to pay tribute to Assyria as a vassal ruler. Given that the Assyrian army extensively plundered and destroyed portions of Mitanni during this campaign, it is unlikely that there at this point were any plans to outright annex and consolidate the Mitanni lands. Sometime later, Shattuara's son Wasashatta rebelled against the Assyrians, though was defeated by Adad-nirari who, as punishment, annexed several cities alongside the Khabur river. At Taite, a former Mitanni capital, Adad-nirari constructed a royal palace for himself.

The primary focus of Adad-nirari was the conquest and/or pacification of Babylonia. Not only did Babylonia present a more immediate threat, but conquering southern Mesopotamia would also be more prestigious. Through military focus on Babylonian border towns, such as Lubdi and Rapiqu, it is clear that Adad-nirari's ultimate goal was to subdue the Babylonians and achieve hegemony over all of Mesopotamia. Adad-nirari's temporary occupations of Lubdi and Rapiqu were met with an attack by the Babylonian king Nazi-Maruttash, though Adad-nirari defeated him at the Battle of Kār Ištar c. 1280 BC and the Assyro-Babylonian border was redrawn in Assyria's favor. Under Adad-nirari's son Shalmaneser I, Assyrian campaigns against its neighbors and equals intensified. According to his own inscriptions, Shalmaneser conquered eight countries (likely minor states) in the first year of his reign. Among the sites captured was the fortress Arinnu, which Shalmaneser razed to the ground and turned into dust. Some of the dust from Arinnu was collected and symbolically brought back to Assur.

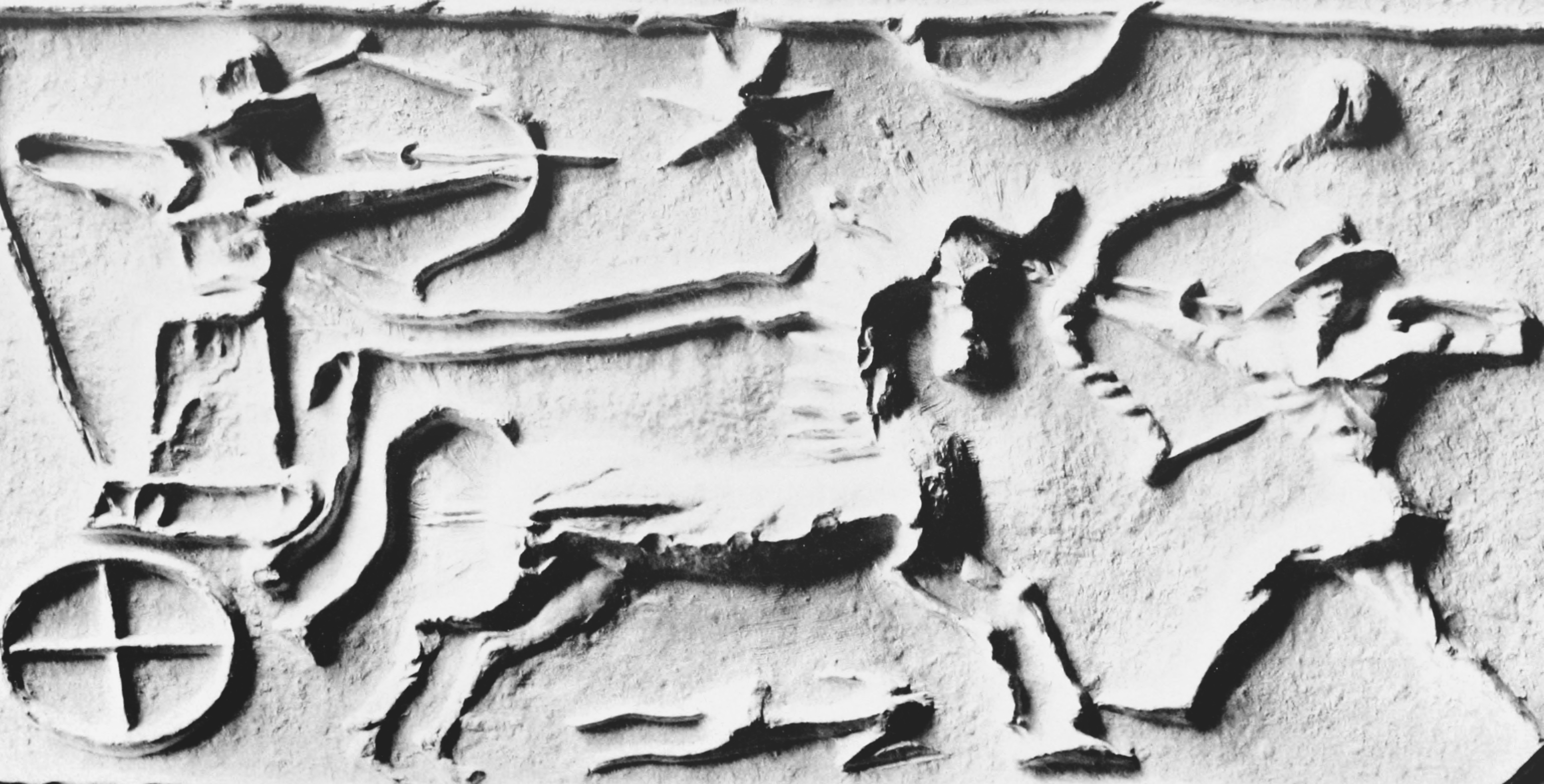
Seal from the Middle Assyrian Empire, c. 1400–1100 BC

After the new Mitanni king Shattuara II rebelled against Assyrian authority, assisted by the Hittites, further campaigns were conducted against Mitanni in order to suppress the resistance. Shalmaneser's campaign against Mitanni was a great success; the Mitanni capital of Washukanni was sacked and, realizing that the Mitanni lands were clearly not controllable through allowing the local rulers to continue to govern as vassals, the kingdom's lands were with some reluctance annexed into the Assyrian kingdom. The lands were not annexed directly into the royal domains, but rather placed under the rule of a viceroy who bore the title of grand vizier and king of Hanigalbat. The first such ruler was Shalmaneser's brother, Ibashi-ili, whose descendants later continued to occupy the position. This arrangement, placing the Mitanni lands under the rule of a lesser branch of the royal family, suggests that the Assyrian elites in the heartland had only a marginal interest in the new conquests. Though Shalmaneser boasted of brutal acts against the defeated Mitanni armies, in one inscription claiming to have blinded over 14,000 prisoners of war, he was also one of the first Assyrian kings to take prisoners in the first place instead of simply executing captured enemies. Adad-nirari was also a great builder; among his most significant construction projects was the construction of the city of Nimrud, a highly significant site in later Assyrian history.

Under Shalmaneser, the Assyrians also conducted significant campaigns against the Hittites. Already in the time of Adad-nirari, Assyrian envoys had been treated poorly at the court of the Hittite king Mursili III. When Mursili's successor Hattusili III reached out to Shalmaneser in an attempt to forge an alliance, probably due to recent losses against Egypt, he was insultingly rejected and called a "substitute of a great king". The strained relations between the two empires sometimes erupted into war; Shalmaneser warred several times against Hittite vassal states in the Levant. The hostilities reached their zenith under Shalmaneser's son and successor Tukulti-Ninurta I, who defeated the Hittites at the Battle of Nihriya c. 1237 BC. The Hittite defeat at Nihriya marked the beginning of the end of their influence in northern Mesopotamia.

==== Reign of Tukulti-Ninurta I ====
Political map of the Ancient Near East in the 13th century BC, when the Middle Assyrian Empire was at its height. Babylonia in the south was an Assyrian vassal c. 1225–1216 BC.

Shalmaneser I's son Tukulti-Ninurta I became king c. 1243 BC. He had, according to historian Stefan Jakob, "an unconditional will to create something that would last forever" and his wide-ranging conquests brought the Middle Assyrian Empire to its greatest extent. Even before he became king, neighboring kingdoms had been wary of his accession; when he assumed the throne, the Hittite king Tudḫaliya IV sent him a letter of congratulations but secretly also sent a letter to the Assyrian grand vizier Babu-aha-iddina in which he implored the vizier to dissuade Tukulti-Ninurta from attacking the Hittite territories in the mountains northwest of Assyria and to work on improving relations. Tudḫaliya's letter did little to dissuade him, who saw through the empty flatteries and attacked and conquered the lands in question in his first few years as king. According to his inscriptions, the conquest was widely celebrated as one of his outstanding early achievements.

Like his predecessors, Tukulti-Ninurta's main focus was on Babylonia. His first act in regard to his southern neighbor, Kashtiliash IV, was to escalate conflict through claiming "traditionally Assyrian" lands along the eastern Tigris. Tukulti-Ninurta shortly thereafter invaded Babylonia through what modern historians generally regard to be an unprovoked attack. In the contemporary Tukulti-Ninurta Epic, a propaganda epic used to justify his exploits, the king is described as acting according to divine order against Kashtiliash, who is described as vile ruler, abandoned by the gods. In the text, he is accused of various atrocities, including attacking Assyria, violating temples, and deporting or killing civilians. Though there is no evidence for these accusations, they might well have been based on real events, albeit probably exaggerated. According to the Tukulti-Ninurta epic, he marched south to the Diyala River and began targeting Babylonian cities, including Sippar and Dur-Kurigalzu. Kashtiliash then attacked the Assyrians, confident that he would be victorious, but he was defeated and then avoided conflict himself for the rest of the war. Tukulti-Ninurta eventually emerged as the winner, conquering Babylonia c. 1225 BC, dragging Kashtiliash back to Assyria as a prisoner, and assuming the ancient title "king of Sumer and Akkad". Given that some inscriptions report "Assyrian refugees" from Babylonia and that some soldiers were "starving", it appears that the victory was a costly one. Tukulti-Ninurta's rule over Babylonia, which nominally placed territories as far south as the Persian Gulf under Assyrian rule, lasted for several years and began the apex of Middle Assyrian power, though Assyrian domination appears to have been rather indirect.

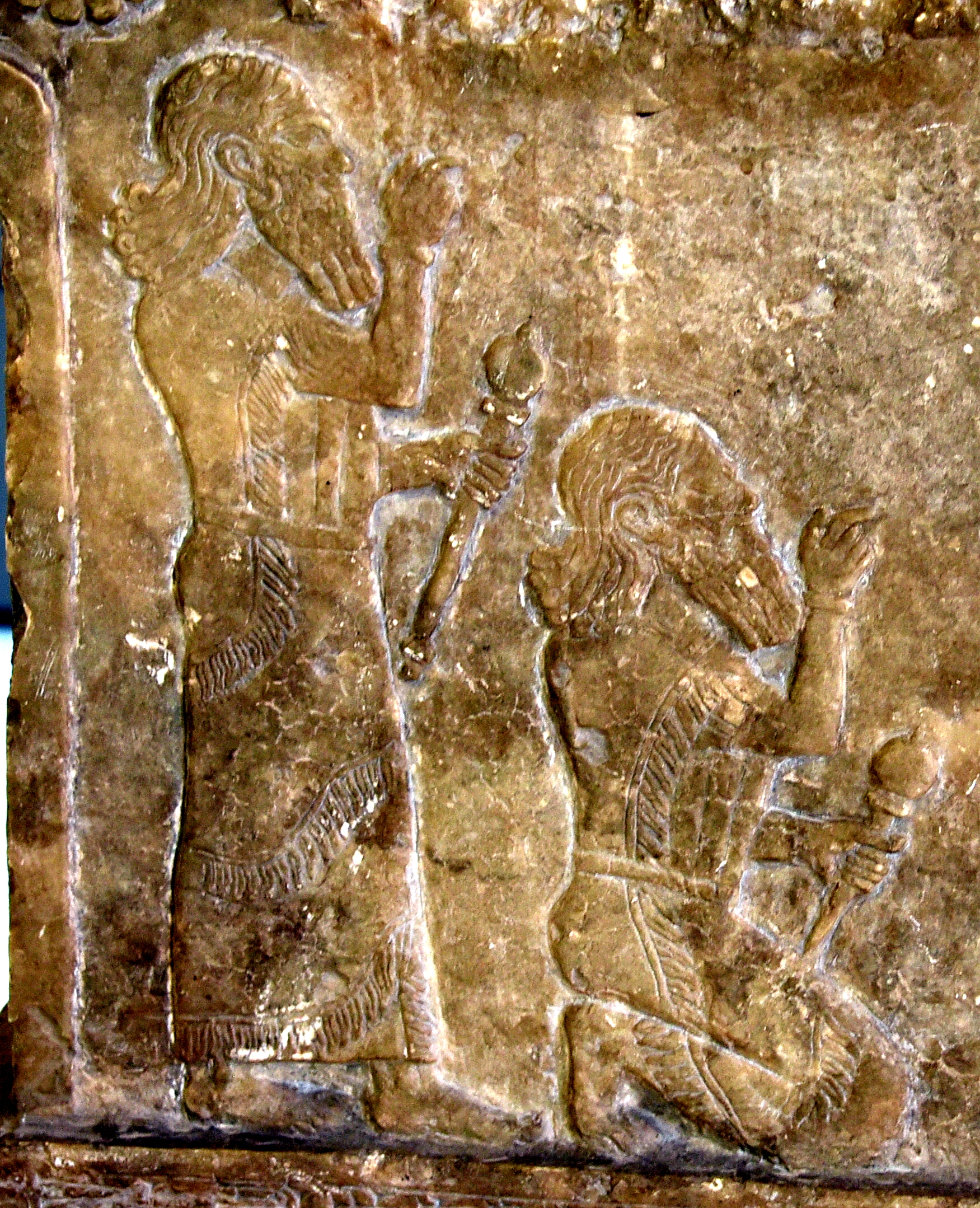
Tukulti-Ninurta I (r. c. 1243–1207 BC), depicted both standing and kneeling (Note: The absence of a royal crown in this image is due to the king being depicted in a religious/cultic context.)

Tukulti-Ninurta experienced some difficulties in keeping his empire together, particularly in Babylonia. Though the period after Kashtiliash's deposition is poorly attested in Babylonia, it appears that there was a second Assyrian campaign directed towards the south c. 1222 BC, after the rule of Tukulti-Ninurta's vassal kings Enlil-nadin-shumi and Kadashman-Harbe II, which resulted in the accession of another vassal, Adad-shuma-iddina. (Note: The Babylonian kings succeeding Kashtiliash IV (Enlil-nadin-shumi, Kadashman-Harbe II and Adad-shuma-iddina) are accorded sequential reigns in the Babylonian King List, together amounting to a period just less than seven years, coincidentally the same amount of time that Tukulti-Ninurta is described as ruling Babylonia. The conventional interpretation is that these three figures, who are not described in the list as genealogically connected to previous kings, were Tukulti-Ninurta's vassals in Babylonia. An alternate interpretation is that these three figures were contemporary rivals, opposing each other, Tukulti-Ninurta, and the eventual succeeding independent Babylonian king Adad-shuma-usur.) Because Tukulti-Ninurta was able to come to Babylon as a guest in c. 1221 BC and make offerings to the Babylonian gods, it is clear that Adad-shuma-iddina enjoyed Assyrian support for his rule. Though this campaign was followed by several years of peace, it is clear that Adad-shuma-iddina eventually stopped acting like a puppet ruler. Though Tukulti-Ninurta forgave him for a revolt in which he seized the city of Lubdi, a second revolt by Adad-shuma-iddina in c. 1217 BC was met with a third campaign against Babylon, in which Tukulti-Ninurta looted the city and carried off the religiously important Statue of Marduk (Marduk being Babylonia's national deity) to Assyria. He assumed the further style "king of the extensive mountains and plains" and claimed to rule from the "Upper Sea to the Lower Sea" and that he received tribute "from the four quarters". In one of his inscriptions, Tukulti-Ninurta went as far as proclaiming himself to be the sun-god Shamash incarnated, titling himself šamšu kiššat niše ("sun[god] of all people"). This claim was highly unusual for an Assyrian king to make as the Assyrian rulers were generally not regarded to be divine figures themselves.

The last Babylonian campaign did not resolve all of Tukulti-Ninurta's problems; the Assyrian army at times had to be deployed to the mountains to the northwest and northeast of the Assyrian heartland to quell uprisings and soon enough, a Babylonian uprising led by Adad-shuma-usur, perhaps a son of Kashtiliash IV, (Note: Adad-shuma-usur is designated as Kashtiliash's son in later Babylonian texts. He himself claimed to be the son of Kashtiliash only in a handful of inscriptions; it is possible that he only claimed to be Kashtiliash's son to further his claim to the Babylonian throne. Records from Elam, though they were written centuries later, designate Adad-shuma-usur as an unrelated usurper, son of a man named Dunna-Sah from the "middle Euphrates river" region.) drove the Assyrians out of Babylonia c. 1216 BC. Tukulti-Ninurta is recorded to have complained to the Hittite king Šuppiluliuma II, at this point an ally of Assyria and expected to cooperate militarily, that he had "remained silent" on the "illegal seizure of power" of Adad-shuma-usur.

In addition to his campaigns and conquests, Tukulti-Ninurta is also famous for the most dramatic construction project of the entire Middle Assyrian period: the construction of a new capital city, Kar-Tukulti-Ninurta, named after himself (the name meaning "fortress of Tukulti-Ninurta"). Founded in the eleventh year of his reign (c. 1233 BC), the construction and brief occupation of the city was the only time the Assyrian capital was moved before the Neo-Assyrian period, centuries later. After Tukulti-Ninurta's death, the capital was transferred back to Assur.

=== First period of decline ===
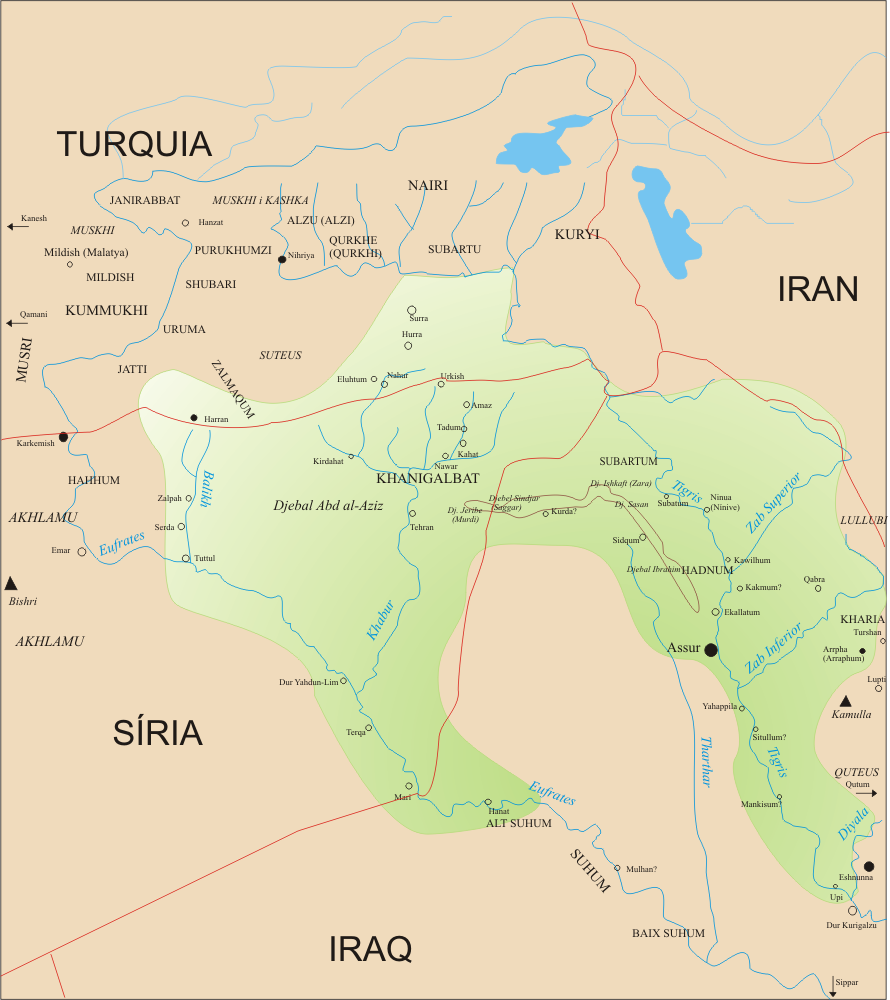
Map of the Middle Assyrian Empire under Ashur-resh-ishi I (r. 1132–1115 BC)

Inscriptions from the late reign of Tukulti-Ninurta showcase increasing internal isolation, as many among the powerful nobility of Assyria grew dissatisfied with his rule, especially after the loss of Babylonia. In some of his own inscriptions, Tukulti-Ninurta appears to lament the losses since his glory days. His long and prosperous reign ended with his assassination, which was followed by inter-dynastic conflict and a significant drop in Assyrian power. Though some historians have attributed the assassination to Tukulti-Ninurta's moving the capital away from Assur, a possibly sacrilegious act, it is more probable that it was the result of the growing dissatisfaction during his late reign. Later chroniclers blame the assassination on his son Ashur-nasir-apli, perhaps a misspelled version of the name of his successor Ashur-nadin-apli (r. c. 1206–1203 BC). Another leader of the conspiracy appears to have been the grand vizier and vassal king of Hanigalbat Ili-ipadda, who retained a prominent position at the court for years thereafter. Ashur-nadin-apli was after his short reign succeeded by two of his brothers, Ashur-nirari III (r. c. 1202–1197 BC) and Enlil-kudurri-usur (r. c. 1196–1192 BC), who also ruled only briefly and were unable to maintain Assyrian power. Though the line of Assyrian kings continued uninterrupted over the course of the decline, Assyria became restricted mostly to just the Assyrian heartland. The decline of the Middle Assyrian Empire broadly coincided with the Late Bronze Age collapse, a time when the Ancient Near East experienced monumental geopolitical changes; within a single generation, the Hittite Empire and the Kassite dynasty of Babylon had fallen, and Egypt had been severely weakened through losing its lands in the Levant. Modern researchers tend to varyingly ascribe the collapse to large-scale migrations, invasions by the mysterious Sea Peoples, new warfare technology and its effects, starvation, epidemics, climate change and unsustainable exploitation of the working population.

Enlil-kudurri-usur enjoyed a much poorer relationship with the line of vassal rulers of Hanigalbat, perhaps because he might not have supported the assassination of his father. Such a poor relationship was dangerous given that these vassal rulers were also members of the Assyrian royal family, as descendants of Adad-nirari I. At some point during Enlil-kudurri-usur's reign, Ili-ipadda's son Ninurta-apal-Ekur traveled to Babylonia where he met with Adad-shuma-usur. With Babylonian support, Ninurta-apal-Ekur then invaded Assyria and defeated Enlil-kudurri-usur in battle. According to the Babylonian Chronicles, he was captured and surrendered to the Babylonians by his own people. Ninurta-apal-Ekur then became king, ending the line of rulers who were direct descendants of Tukulti-Ninurta. During his reign, c. 1191–1179 BC, Ninurta-apal-Ekur proved to be, like his immediate predecessors, unable to do much about the collapse of the empire. In the reign of his son, Ashur-dan I (r. c. 1178–1133 BC), the situation improved somewhat as can be gathered from a campaign directed by Ashur-dan I against the Babylonian king Zababa-shuma-iddin, illustrating that hopes for gaining control of at least some southern lands and reasserting superiority over Babylonia had not been completely abandoned.

After Ashur-dan's death in 1133 BC, his two sons Ninurta-tukulti-Ashur and Mutakkil-Nusku struggled for power, with Mutakkil-Nusku emerging victorious but then only ruling for less than a year. Mutakkil-Nusku began a conflict with the Babylonian king Itti-Marduk-balatu over control of the city of Zanqi or Zaqqa, which continued in the reign of his son and successor Ashur-resh-ishi I (r. 1132–1115 BC). In the Synchronistic History (a later Assyrian document), further tensions at Zanqi are described between Ashur-resh-ishi and the Babylonian king Nebuchadnezzar I, which included a battle in which the Babylonians burned down their own siege engines so that they would not be captured by the Assyrians. Though the Synchronistic History describes Assyria as in danger of Babylonian aggression in the reign of Nebuchadnezzar's father and predecessor Ninurta-nadin-shumi, it casts Ashur-resh-ishi as a savior of the empire, who defeated Nebuchadnezzar in several battles and was able to defend the southern Assyrian border. Ashur-resh-ishi as such began to reverse the decades of Assyrian decline and in his inscriptions claimed the epithet "avenger of Assyria" (mutēr gimilli māt Aššur).

=== Second period of expansion and consolidation ===
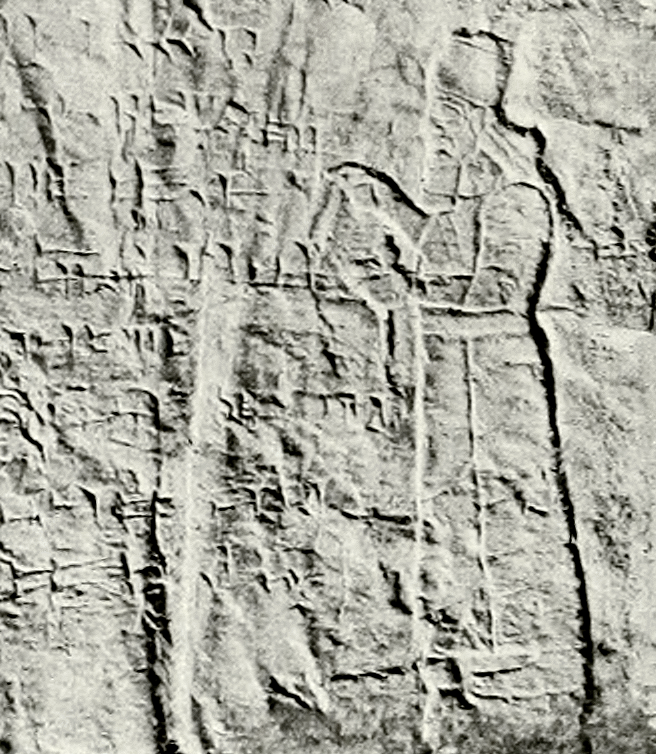
Relief depicting Tiglath-Pileser I (r. 1114–1076 BC)

Ashur-resh-ishi's son and successor Tiglath-Pileser I (r. 1114–1076 BC) inaugurated a second period of Middle Assyrian ascendancy. Owing to his father's victories against Babylon, Tiglath-Pileser was free to divert his attention to other regions and not worry about a southern attack. Texts written already during his first few regnal years demonstrate that Tiglath-Pileser ruled with more confidence than his predecessors, using titles such as "unrivalled king of the universe, king of the four quarters, king of all princes, lord of lords" and epithets such as "splendid flame which covers the hostile land like a rain storm". In his first year as king, Tiglath-Pileser defeated the Mushki, a tribe who had taken control of various lands in the north fifty years prior. The inscriptions mention that no king had defeated them in battle before and that their 20,000 men strong army, led by five kings, was defeated by Tiglath-Pileser, who however allowed the 6,000 surviving enemies to settle in Assyria as his subjects. One of the Mushki strongholds, the city of Katmuḫu in the northeast, continued to be troublesome for a few years before it was reconquered, looted and its king, Errupi, was deported. Numerous other sites in the northeast were also conquered and incorporated into his empire.

Tiglath-Pileser also went on significant campaigns in the west. The cities of northern Syria, which had ceased to pay tribute decades prior, were reconquered and the Kaskians and Urumeans, tribes who had also settled in the region, voluntarily submitted to him immediately upon the arrival of his army. He also waged war on the Nairi people in the Armenian highlands. Famed for their knowledge of horse breeding, his self-admitted goal of this campaign was to acquire more horses for the Assyrian army. It is clear from his inscriptions that the goal of the campaigns were to instill respect among the rulers of the lands formerly subordinate to Assyria, to reconquer the old Assyrian borders, and to go beyond them; "Altogether, I conquered 42 lands and their rulers from the other side of the Lower Zab in distant mountainous regions to the other side of the Euphrates River, people of Ḫatti, (Note: Ḫatti, the "land of the Hittites", here refers to northern Syria.) and the Upper Sea in the west – from my accession year to my fifth regnal year. I subdued them to one authority, took hostages from them, (and) imposed upon them tribute and impost".

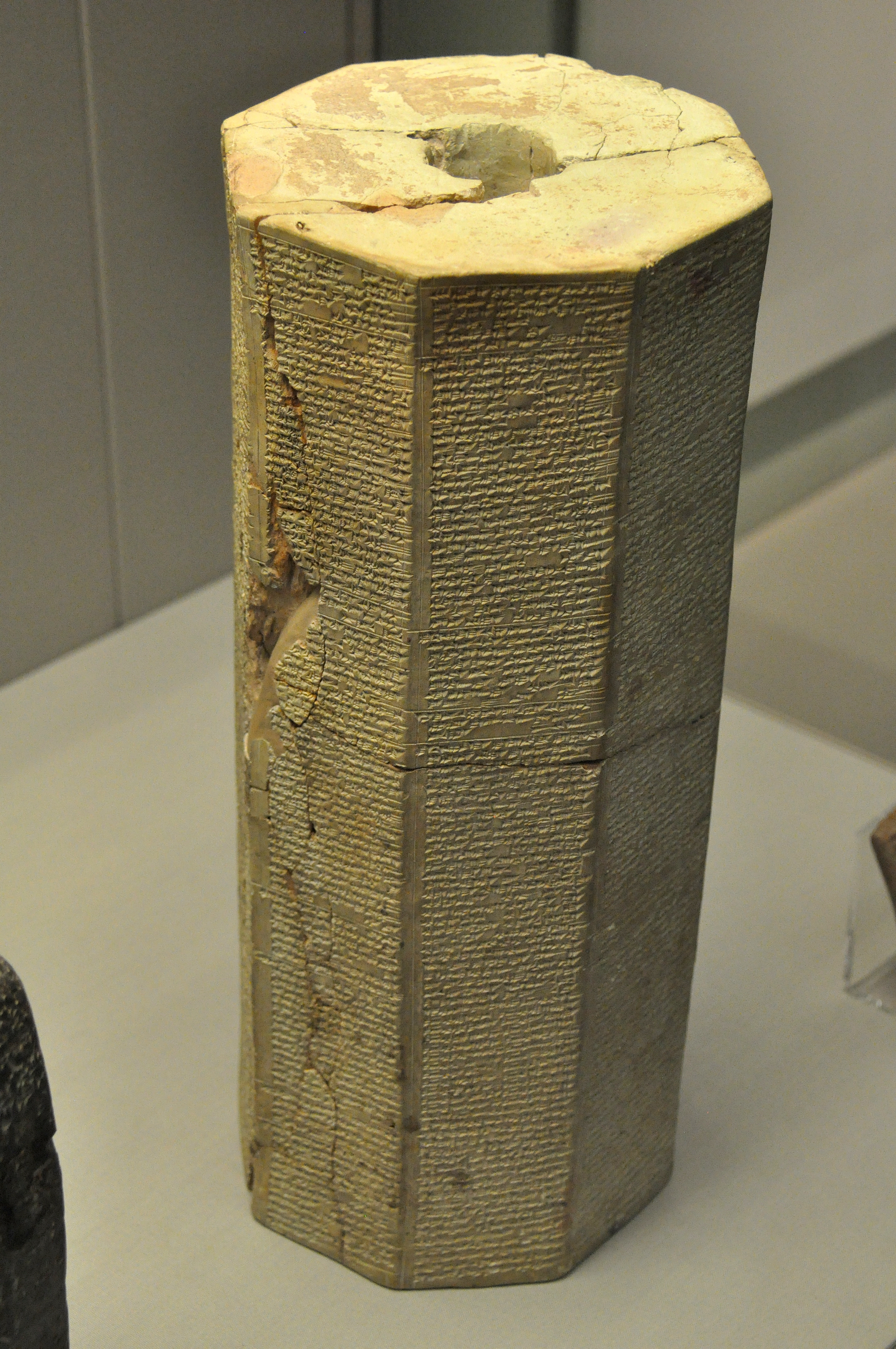
Terracotta octagon from Assur recounting the campaigns and civil activities of Tiglath-Pileser I

Tiglath-Pileser's inscriptions are the first Assyrian inscriptions to describe punitive measures against rebelling cities and regions in any detail. A more important innovation was increasing the size of the Assyrian cavalry and introducing war chariots on a grander scale than previous kings. Chariots were also increasingly used by Assyria's enemies. In the final years of his reign, he twice engaged the Babylonian king Marduk-nadin-ahhe in battles with a great number of chariots. Though he did not conquer Babylonia, several cities, including Babylon itself, were successfully attacked and looted. He was probably unable to conquer Babylonia since a significant amount of attention needed to be diverted to the Aramean tribes in the west. Though he was one of the most powerful kings of the Middle Assyrian period, succeeding in imposing tribute from as far away as Phoenicia, his achievements were not long-lasting and several territories, especially in the west, were likely lost again before his death.

As a result of Tiglath-Pileser's campaigns, Assyria became somewhat overstretched and his successors had to adapt to be on the defensive. His son and successor Asharid-apal-Ekur (r. 1075–1074 BC) ruled too briefly to do anything and his successor Ashur-bel-kala (r. 1073–1056 BC), another son of Tiglath-Pileser, managed to only briefly follow in his father's footsteps. Ashur-bel-kala campaigned in the mountains to the northeast and the Levant and is recorded to have received gifts from Egypt. Though political objectives had thus not changed since Tiglath-Pileser's time, Ashur-bel-kala too had to divert significant attention to the Arameans. Due to the Aramean tactics of avoiding open battle and instead attacking the Assyrians in numerous minor skirmishes, the Assyrian army could not take advantage of their technical and numerial superiority. The Arameans were not Ashur-bel-kala's only enemies in the west, given that he is also recorded to have fought against Tukulti-Mer, king of Mari. The conflict with Marduk-nadin-ahhe in Babylonia continued under Ashur-bel-kala, though it was eventually resolved diplomatically. After the death of Marduk-nadin-ahhe's successor Marduk-shapik-zeri in c. 1065 BC, Ashur-bel-kala was even able to intervene and install the unrelated Adad-apla-iddina as king of Babylon. Adad-apla-iddina's daughter then married Ashur-bel-kala, bringing peace to the two kingdoms. Though he shared his father's ambition, and claimed the title "lord of all" after his victorious campaigns in Syria, Babylonia and the northeastern mountains, Ashur-bel-kala was ultimately unable to surpass Tiglath-Pileser and his successes were built on shaky foundations.

=== Second period of decline ===
==== Century of crisis ====
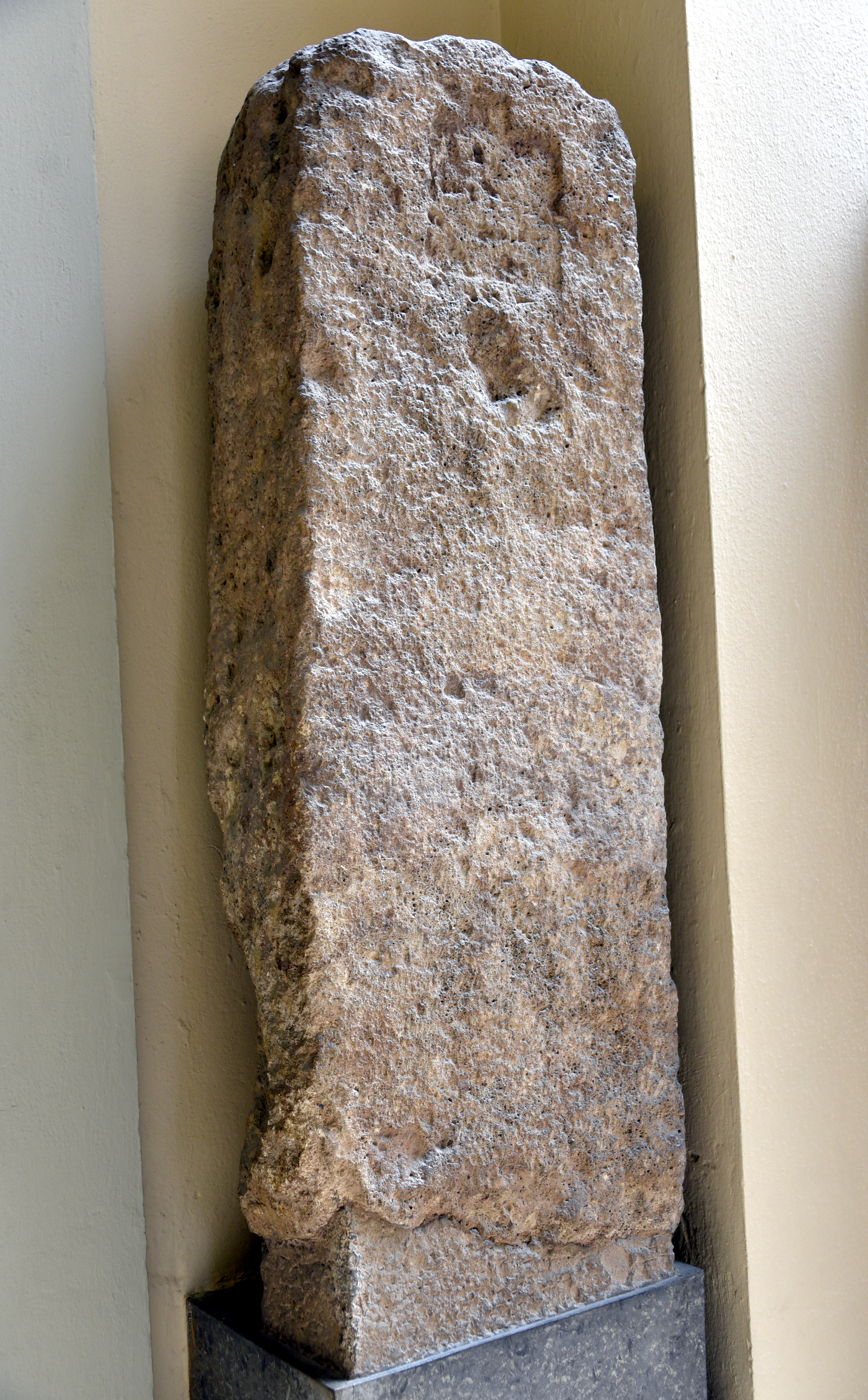
Stele of Ashur-resh-ishi II (r. 972–967 BC) from Assur

Ashur-bel-kala's son and successor Eriba-Adad II (r. 1056–1054 BC), and generations of kings thereafter, were unable to maintain the achievements of their predecessors. The period of decline initiated after Ashur-bel-kala's death was not reversed until the middle of the 10th century BC. Though this period is poorly documented, (Note: Though fewer in number than in preceding and succeeding times, a number of royal inscriptions are known from the second period of Middle Assyrian decline, particularly from the reign of Ashurnasirpal I (r. 1049–1031 BC).) it is clear that Assyria underwent a major crisis.

Although Assyria was only marginally affected by the Late Bronze Age collapse, the collapse caused great changes in the geopolitics of the lands surrounding Assyria. In large part, the power vacuum left by the Hittites and Egyptians in Anatolia and the Levant allowed various ethno-tribal communities and states to take their place. In northern Anatolia and northern Syria, the Luwians seized power, forming the Syro-Hittite states. In Syria, the Arameans grew increasingly prominent. In Palestine, the Philistines and Israelites carved out realms of their own, eventually coalescing into the Kingdom of Israel. Though cuneiform had previously been the main writing system of these regions, the rise of new peoples and realms led to cuneiform being replaced in the west by more simple alphabetic writing systems. Out of the new players on the scene, the Arameans, through their at times eastward movements, had the most effect on Assyria. Documents as old as from the reign of Tiglath-Pileser I demonstrate that even at that early stage, Aramean raids penetrated deep into the Assyrian heartland, at one point reaching Assur itself. The Arameans were tribal and their attacks were uncoordinated raids carried out by individual groups. As such, Assyrian kings were able to defeat several Aramean groups in battle. The guerilla tactics and ability of the Arameans to quickly withdraw into difficult terrain however prevented Assyrian armies from ever achieving a lasting decisive victory. From the death of Ashurnasirpal I (r. 1049–1031 BC) to the end of the Middle Assyrian period more than a century later, no surviving Assyrian royal inscriptions describe any military activities whatsoever. Though kings from this time, such as Shalmaneser II (r. 1030–1019 BC) and Ashur-rabi II (r. 1012–972 BC), used names that proudly echoed those of earlier successful rulers, suggesting a desire to restore old glory, later Assyrian documents saw this time as one of painful losses of territory. By 1000 BC, Assyria was at the low point of its power, with many previously large settlements lying in ruins and local rulers battling new tribal chiefs for control of lands that were previously part of the empire. The Assyrian heartland continued to remain intact, however, protected due to its geographical remoteness.

==== Beginning of the Assyrian reconquista ====
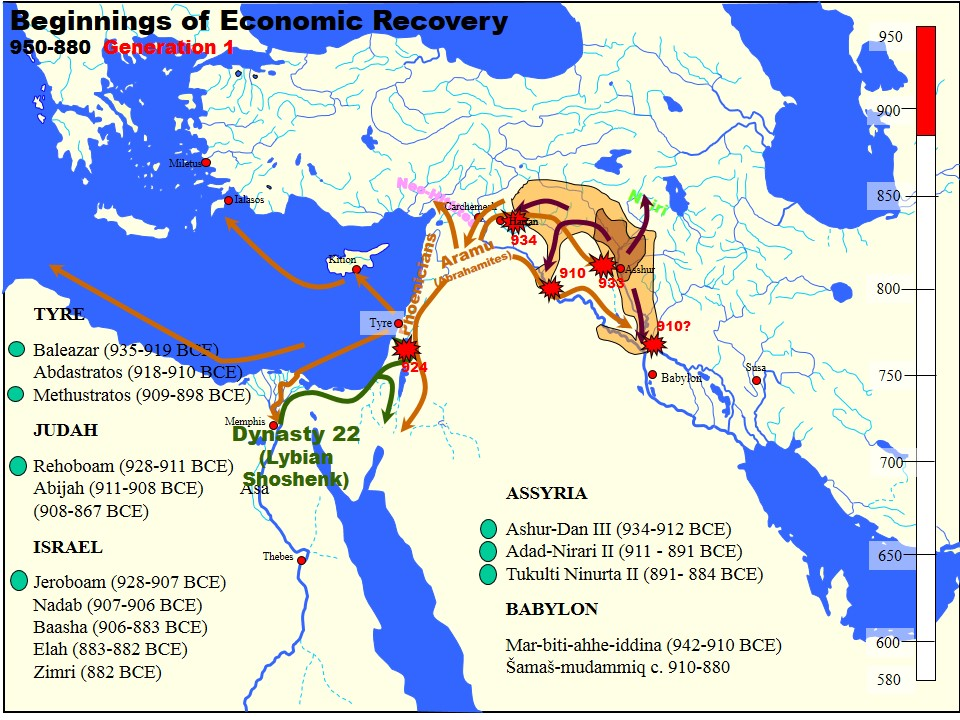
Assyrian borders and campaigns under Ashur-dan II (r. 934–912 BC) and the first Neo-Assyrian kings

The Assyrian kings never ceased to believe that the lost lands would eventually be retaken. In the end, the collapse of the Hittites and the Egyptian lands in the Levant benefitted Assyria; with the old empires shattered, the fragmented territories surrounding the Assyrian heartland would eventually prove to be easy conquests for the Assyrian army. The reign of Ashur-dan II (r. 934–912 BC) effectively terminated the poorly documented second period of Middle Assyrian decline. Multiple inscriptions survive from Ashur-dan's time, several of which describe campaigns in the peripheries of the Assyrian heartland, illustrating that Assyrian power was beginning to resurge. Ashur-dan's campaigns were mainly focused on the northeast and northwest. Among the victories recorded in his inscriptions was the conquest of Katmuḫu, which once again had gained independence during the decline. According to the inscription, Ashur-dan captured Katmuḫu, razed the city's royal palace, brought its king to Arbela, flayed and executed him, and then displayed his skin on the wall of one of his cities. Assyrian reconquest meant that a high level of threat had to be established in order to keep the vassals in line; an explanation for the brutality and violence of certain acts (such as Ashur-dan's treatment of the defeated king) committed by the Assyrian kings. The descriptions of such acts in inscriptions do not necessarily reflect the truth given that they also served as intimidating tools for propaganda and psychological warfare.

The campaigns of Ashur-dan paved the way of grander efforts to restore and expand Assyrian power, beginning in the reign of his son and successor Adad-nirari II (r. 911–891 BC), whose accession conventionally marks the beginning of the succeeding Neo-Assyrian Empire. Although historically sometimes treated as a separate and distinct entity from the Middle Assyrian Empire, the Neo-Assyrian Empire was clearly the direct continuation of the Middle Assyrian civilization given that the line of kings and inhabitation of the Assyrian heartland was continuous. The inscriptions of early Neo-Assyrian kings typically treat their wars of expansions as reconquests of territory lost during the decline of the Middle Assyrian Empire.

== Government ==
=== Kingship ===
==== Power and role ====
In the preceding Old Assyrian period, the Assyrian government was in many respects an oligarchy, with the king being a permanent, but not the only prominent, actor, presiding over the meetings of Assur's main administrative body, the city assembly. Perhaps partly inspired by the period of more autocratic rule when Assur was under the rule of the Amorite conqueror Shamshi-Adad I c. 1808–1776 BC, the influence of the city assembly had disappeared by the time of Ashur-uballit I's accession. Although the old traditional royal title iššiak Aššur ("governor [on behalf] of Ashur") continued to be used at times throughout the period, the Middle Assyrian kings had little in common with their Old Assyrian predecessors and were very much sole rulers. As Assyria's power grew, the kings began to employ an increasingly sophisticated array of royal titles far more autocratic in nature than the old iššiak Aššur. Ashur-uballit I was the first to assume the style šar māt Aššur ("king of the land of Ashur") and his grandson Arik-den-ili introduced the style šarru dannu ("strong king"). The kings during Assyria's first major phase of expansion accelerated the adoption of new titles. Adad-nirari I's inscriptions required 32 lines to be devoted just to his titles, which included, among others, nêr dapnūti ummān kaššî qutî lullumî u šubarî ("defeater of the aggressive armies of the Kassites, Qutû, Lullumu, and Šubaru"), šakanki ilāni ("appointee of the gods") and rubā’u ellu ("holy prince"). The development reached its peak under the wide-ranging Tukulti-Ninurta I, who used various styles denoting the size of his domain, such as "king of Assyria and Karduniash", "king of Sumer and Akkad", "king of the Upper and the Lower Seas" and "king of all peoples". Royal titles and epithets were often highly reflective of current political developments and the achievements of individual kings; during the periods of decline, the royal titles used typically grew more simple again, only to grow grander once more as Assyrian power experienced resurgences.

In addition to their roles as military leaders, the kings were religiously significant. Already in the Old Assyrian period, the kings were regarded to be the stewards of the Assyrian national deity Ashur, though this began to manifest itself even more in the Middle Assyrian period. The earliest Assyrian king known to have explicitly referred to himself as a priest (šangû) was Adad-nirari I, who among his titles used the epithet šangû ṣıru ša Enlil ("exalted priest of the god Enlil"). Several sources emphasize the Assyrian king being close to Ashur, and their role as intermediaries between Ashur and mankind. The king was expected to, in conjunction with the Assyrian people, provide offerings to the god. Middle Assyrian kings were also expected to care for all the other gods; Shalmaneser I in his inscriptions mentions that he provided offerings for "all of the gods". From the time of Ashur-resh-ishi I onwards, the religious and cultic duties of the king were pushed somewhat into the background, though they were still prominently mentioned in accounts of building and restoring temples. Assyrian titles and epithets in inscriptions from then on generally emphasize the kings as powerful warriors.

Middle Assyrian kings were the supreme judicial authority in the empire, though they generally appear to have been less concerned with their role as judges than their predecessors in the Old Assyrian period were. The kings were however expected to ensure the welfare and prosperity of the Assyrian lands and people, often referring to themselves as "shepherds" (re’û). Middle Assyrian royal inscriptions also pay special attention to public works, with the building and repairs of temples being the primary concern, but construction of other works, such as palaces, also being mentioned. When rebuilding or constructing buildings, the kings often laid down foundation deposits with their names. Later rulers were expected to honor the works of their predecessors and anyone who did not was cursed. One of Tukulti-Ninurta's foundation deposits, relating to the construction of Kar-Tukulti-Ninurta, included the message "He who destroys that wall, discards my monumental inscriptions and my inscribed name, abandons Kar‐Tukulti‐Ninurta, my capital, and neglects (it): may the god Ashur, my lord, overthrow his sovereignty, smash his weapons, bring about the defeat of his army, diminish his borders, decree the end of his reign, darken his days, vitiate his years (and) destroy his name and his seed from the land".

==== Royal palaces and attendants ====
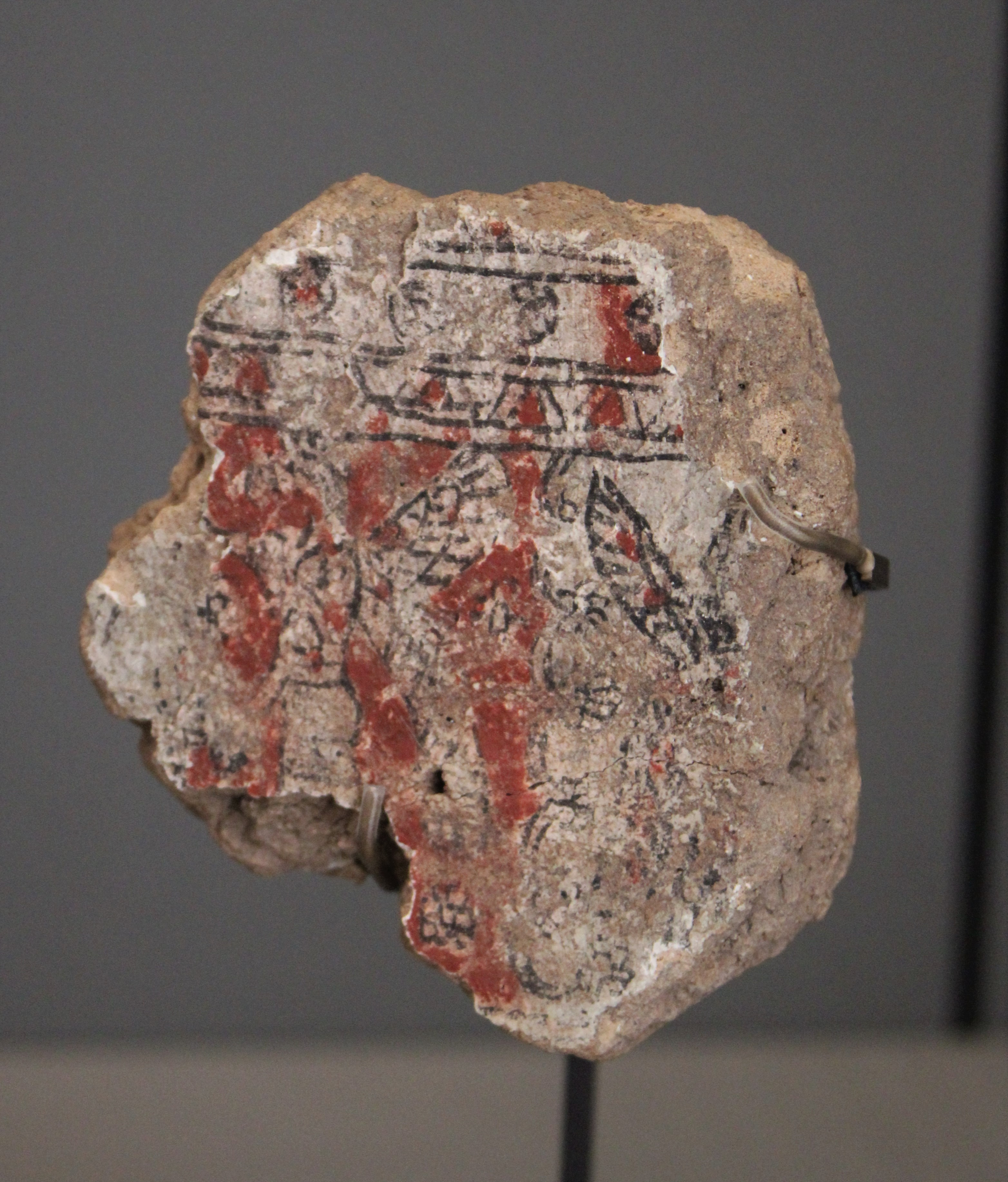
Fragment of a wall painting from Tukulti-Ninurta I's royal palace at Kar-Tukulti-Ninurta

Middle Assyrian royal palaces were prominent symbols of royal power, and the centers and main institutions of the Assyrian government. Though the main palace was located in Assur, kings had palaces at several different sites which they often traveled between. The most important surviving source concerning Middle Assyrian royal palaces are the Middle Assyrian palace decrees, a set of documents composed either late in the reign of Tiglath-Pileser I or in the reigns of his immediate successors. These documents contain a large number of regulations on the personnel of the palaces and their roles and duties, in particular the women. These regulations differentiate between the "wife of the king" (aššat šarre), what modern historians would term the "queen", (Note: Though the primary consorts of the Assyrian kings are typically referred to as "queens" by modern historians, that position did not formally exist in ancient Assyria. The feminine version of the word for king (šar) was šarratum, but this was reserved for goddesses and foreign queens who ruled in their own right. Because the consorts of the kings did not rule themselves, they were not regarded as their equals and as such not called šarratum.) and a group of "palace women" (sinniltu ša ekalle), i.e. a royal harem composed of women of lower rank. The life and court politics within the palaces followed strict rules, overseen by a council of appointed office holders closely linked to the royal court. Officials included "provincial governors" (bēl pāḫete), "palace administrators" (rab ekalle), "palace heralds" (nāgir ekalle), "chief supervisors" (rab zāriqe) and "physicians of the Inner Quarters" (asû ša betā nū). These councilors supervised the conduct of other courtiers, who were divided into ša-rēši and mazzāz pāni. The meaning of these designations are poorly understood, and some individuals are attested with both. It is possible that the ša-rēši were eunuchs, though this is disputed. The mazzāz pāni may have been close friends and confidants of the king.

The surviving palace decrees deal with rules and daily lives of the people who lived in the palaces. They include texts concerning admission requirements for male personnel and whether they should have access to the harem, the proper behavior of the palace women (both within and outside the palaces), custody of property and dispute resolution. Among the Middle Assyrian kings, Ninurta-apal-Ekur was responsible for a particularly large amount of decrees, perhaps because he wished to restore order after his usurpation of the throne. Curiously, one of his decrees is that any palace woman who "cursed a descendant of Tukulti-Ninurta" should be mutilated; despite Ninurta-apal-Ekur having taken the throne by force from Enlil-kudurri-usur, the last of Tukulti-Ninurta I's descendants to rule Assyria.

The chief administrator of the palaces were the stewards (mašennu), identified in writings as "great stewards" (mašennu rabi’u) from the late 12th century BC onwards to distinguish from stewards of smaller households. The stewards were in charge of the large storage facilities of the palaces, where craftsmen produced various products gathered from raw materials. The stewards also served as organizers of long-distance trade. Their main duty was to provide the palaces with metals, animals, animal skins and luxury goods (such as jewelry, wooden objects, textiles and perfume).

=== Administration ===
==== Royal administration and provincial framework ====
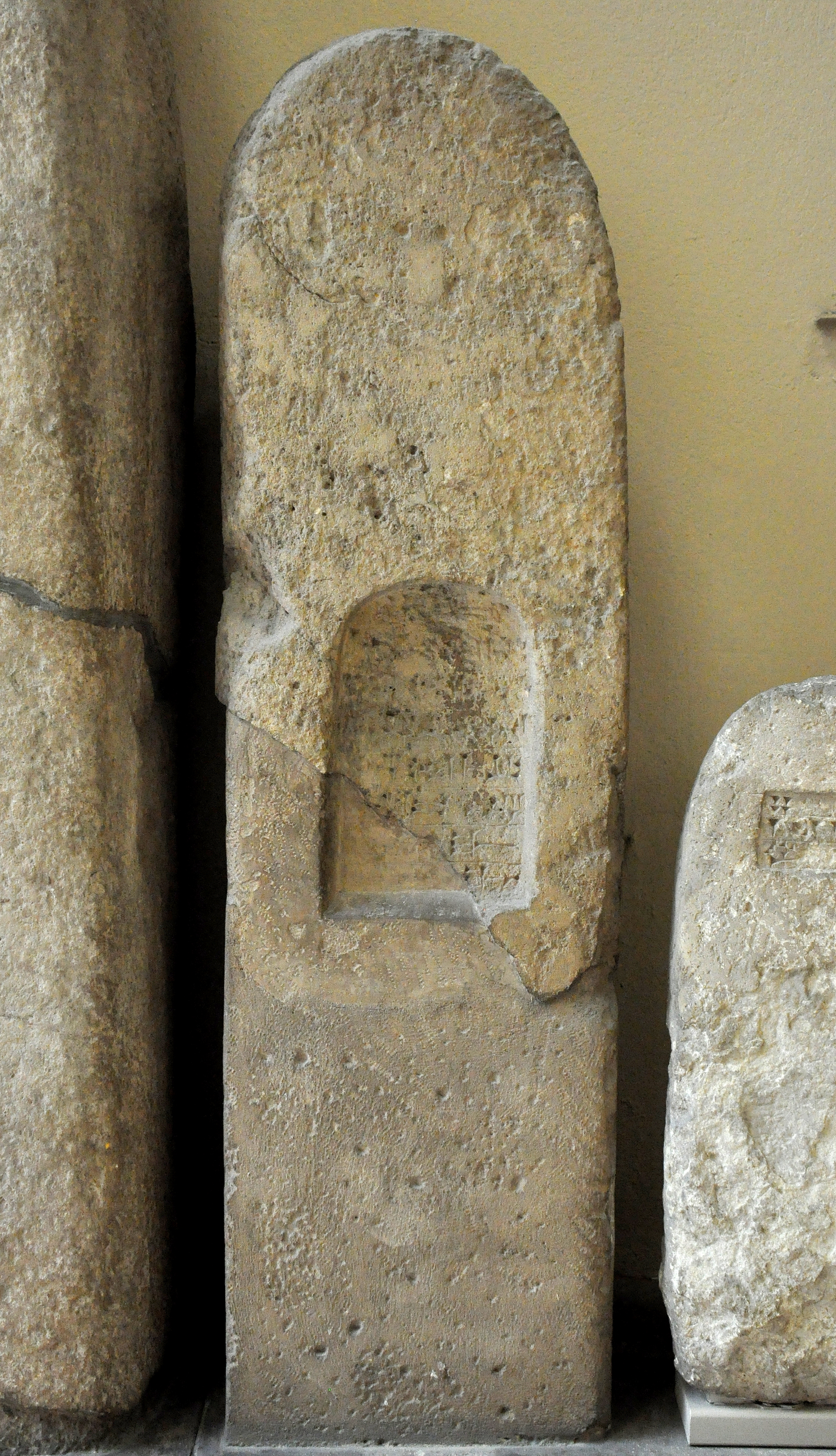
Stele of Ashur-mudammeq, governor of Nineveh, c. 1200 BC

Recognized as the intermediary between mankind and the gods, the Assyrian king was the head of the administration of Assyria during the Middle Assyrian period. Though there is no evidence that the Middle Assyrian kings had a cabinet of his highest officials, as might have been the case in the succeeding Neo-Assyrian period, the kings did surround themselves with a group of counselors that advised on politics and decisions. Among the most prominent such counselors were the viziers (sukkallu), who at times involved themselves in diplomatic matters. From at least the time of Shalmaneser I onwards there were also grand viziers (sukkallu rabi’u), superior to the ordinary viziers, who often also served as vassal rulers of the lands of the former Mitanni kingdom. The grand viziers were typically members of the royal family. Like many other administrative and bureaucratic offices, the position was hereditary, with sons succeeding their fathers. Other bureaucrats were drawn from the ša-rēši of the palaces and were tasked with various fields of responsibility to aid the king in keeping contact with various institutions throughout the empire, including keeping track of crop yields and the number of farm animals, allocating royal gifts, certifying private sales of land, and noting down amounts of tribute, prisoners of war and levies. If they so wished, the king could intervene at any level at any time, either in person, through a command, by issuing a decree, or by sending a representative. The most powerful officials had representatives of their own, termed qepū.

The territory of the Middle Assyrian Empire was divided into a set of provinces or districts (pāḫutu), first attested during the reign of Ashur-uballit I. In some 13th-century BC sources there also appears another type of subdivision, the ḫalṣu (fortifications/districts), but these were soon thereafter replaced completely with pāḫutu. The number of provinces changed as the territory of Assyria expanded and contracted, with the highest number of provinces being recorded in the reign of Tukulti-Ninurta I. Each province was headed by a provincial governor (bel pāḫete) who was responsible for the local economy and public safety and order. Another important task of the governors was to store and distribute the goods produced in the province, which were inspected and collected by royal representatives once a year. Through this system, the central government remained informed about current stocks of supplies throughout the empire. The governors also supervised local craftsmen and farmers, organizing their activities and ensuring that they had enough food and other supplies to live. If rations were low, governors requested support from the king and other governors, and were in turn required to provide such support for others as well. In addition to taxes, provinces had to supply offerings to the god Ashur, marking their affiliation and allegiance to the Assyrian government. The offerings were quite small and mainly symbolic.

==== Non-provincial territories ====
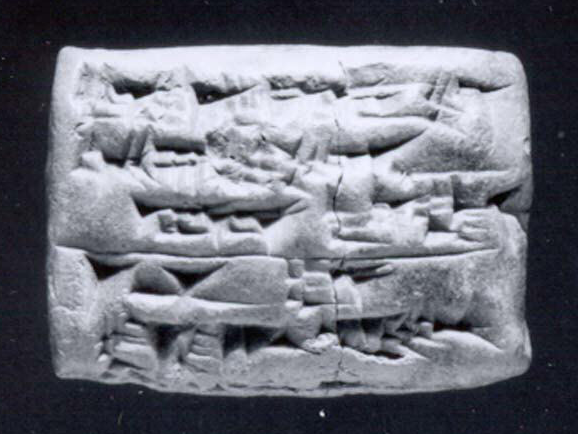
13th-century BC Middle Assyrian cuneiform tablet containing an administrative memorandum

Some regions of the Assyrian realm were outside of the provincial framework but still subject to the Assyrian kings, these included vassal states ruled by lesser kings, such as the Mitanni lands governed by the grand viziers. Under the provincial governors, cities also had their own administrations, headed by mayors (ḫazi’ānu), appointed by the kings but representing the local city elite. Similar to the governors, though less important, the mayors were mostly responsible for local economy, including overseeing rations, agriculture and organization of labor.

The Assyrians also employed what they referred to as the ilku system, not entirely unlike the feudalism of Medieval Europe; the Assyrian kings had claims to most of the empire's lands, including private property, so in turn for providing attendants and personnel with arable lands to sustain themselves, the kings expected their service in return. The extent and nature of these services varied and was determined by the royal administration. If a landowner died or refused their agreed-upon duties, his families could lose the lands they had been given. It is not clear what factors determined the nature of the services, nor what determined how much land a particular individual or family were given. The most high-ranking officials were typically provided with large states, perhaps including entire villages and their people. In theory, the system ensured close links between landowners and their land, but numerous factors destabilized the system. These included that the duties did not have to be exercised in person, but could be fulfilled by paying money or by sending a representative, and that lands could be sold to a purchaser, who then had to take on the duties the previous owner had been demanded to undertake. Over long periods of time, this meant that the connection between duties and overseeing the land allotted was severed.

Some influential Assyrian officials were as rewards for their services granted dunnu settlements, large estates that functioned as large farmsteads and were exempt from taxation on their produce. Such estates are most common in the empire's western territories, were local governors and representatives required greater autonomy to deal with local geopolitics and challenges. The most well-known site today that at one point functioned as a dunnu estate is Tell Sabi Abyad. Documents describe the estate as a large agricultural one, comprising about 3,600 hectares and employing around 100 free farmers and their families, as well as 100 unfree (šiluhlu̮) farmers and their families.

=== Taxation and recruitment ===
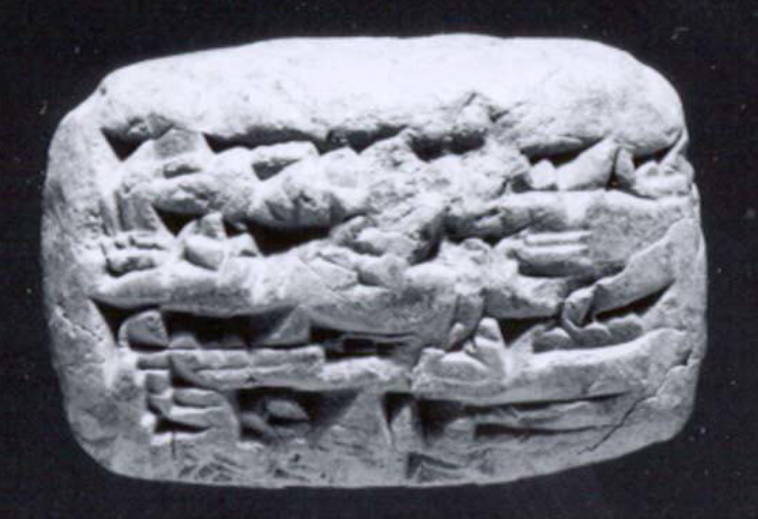
13th-century BC Middle Assyrian cuneiform tablet containing an administrative record

In order for the large construction projects and military activities of the Middle Assyrian kings to have been possible, the Middle Assyrian Empire employed a sophisticated system of recruiting and administering personnel. To keep track of and administer the diverse people under imperial control, a specific type of waxed tablets, dubbed le’ānū (le’ū in singular form), were employed. These tablets, attested from the time of Adad-nirari I onwards, summarized data on the available manpower, calculated required rations and provisions and documented responsibilities and tasks. According to administrative records on construction work at the royal palaces of Kar-Tukulti-Ninurta and Assur, these projects were completed with workforces of about 2,000 men, divided into recruits from various cities (ḫurādu), mostly gathered through the ilku system, (Note: Some personnel were also recruited from the provinces through other means, without any ilku obligations. People recruited through other means were sometimes referred to as "perru troops" (sạbū perrūtu), organized under "lords of the perru" (bēlē ̄perre).) engineers or architects (šalimpāju), carpenters and religious functionaries.

The taxation system of the Middle Assyrian Empire is not yet fully understood. Though tax collectors are known to have existed, records of taxes being collected and what these were are lacking; the only currently confidently attested direct tax paid by individuals was an import tax, levied on imports of goods from foreign states. In at least one case, this tax amounted to about 25 percent of the purchase price. Some documents also mention the ginā’u tax, which had some connection to the provincial governments. Other economically important sources of money for the empire included plundering conquered territories, which reduced the cost of the campaign that had conquered them, continuous tribute (madattu) from vassal states, as well as "audience gifts" (nāmurtu) from foreign rulers and powerful individuals. These gifts could sometimes be carry large value for the empire itself; one documents attests that a gift given to Ninurta-tukulti-Ashur while he was still a prince in the reign of his father Ashur-dan I included 914 sheep.

== Military ==
There was no standing army in the Middle Assyrian period. Instead, the majority of soldiers used for military engagements were mobilized only when they were needed, such as for civil projects or in the time of campaigns. Large amounts of soldiers could be recruited and mobilized relative quickly on the basis of legal obligations and regulations. It is impossible to ascertain from the surviving inscriptions the extent to which Middle Assyrian levies were trained for their tasks, but it is unlikely that the Assyrian army would be able to be as successful as it was in the reigns of figures like Tukulti-Ninurta I and Tiglath-Pileser I without trained soldiers. In addition to the levies, who are called ḫurādu or ṣābū ḫurādātu in the inscriptions, there was also a more experienced class of "professional" soldiers, called the ṣābū kaṣrūtu. It is not clear what exactly separated the ṣābū kaṣrūtu from the other soldiers; perhaps the term included some certain branches of the army, such as archers and charioteers, who required more extensive training than normal foot soldiers, probably part of the ṣābū ḫurādātu. It is also clear from inscriptions that bands of mercenaries were recruited for some campaigns.

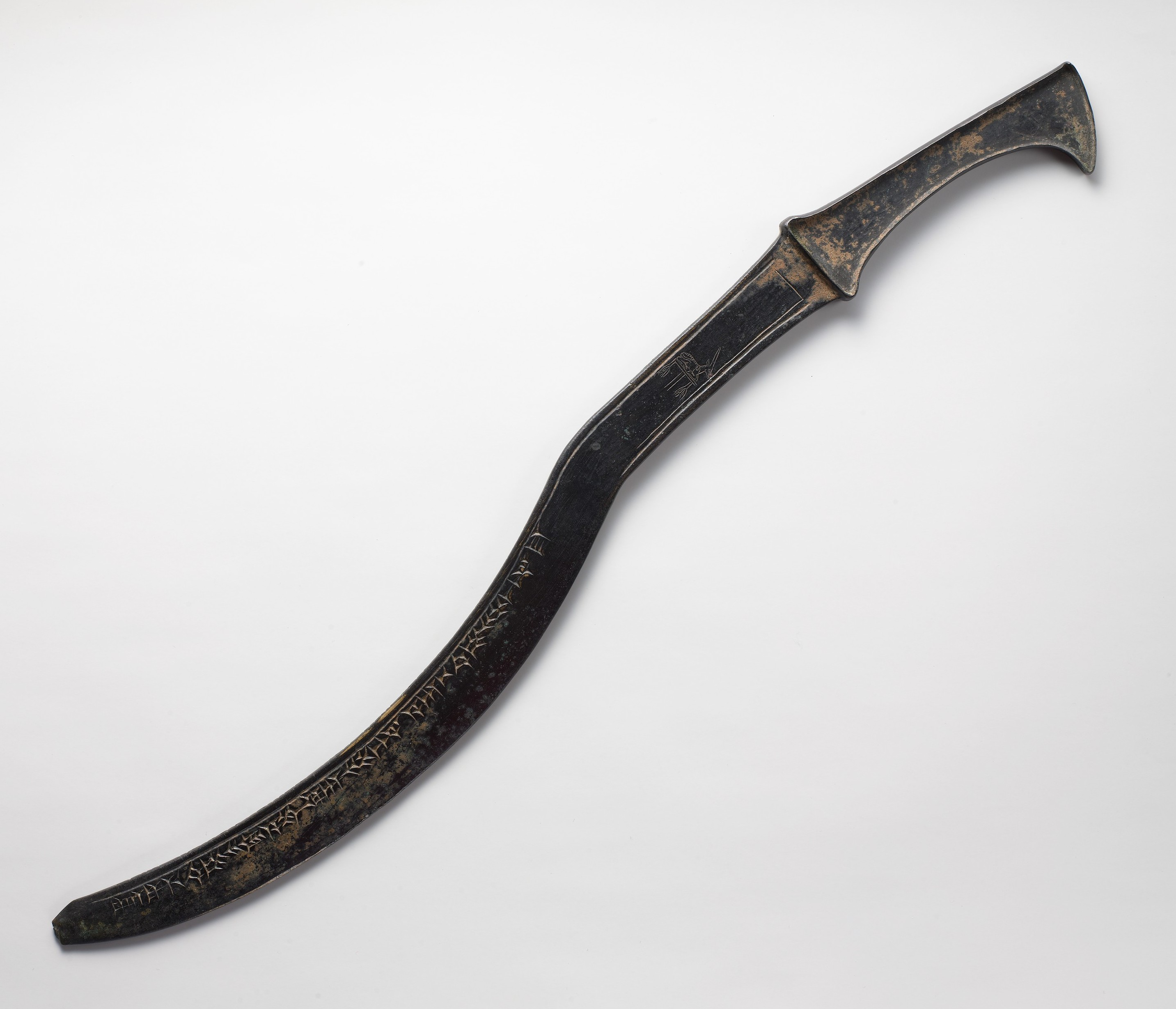
Ceremonial sickle sword which once belonged to the Middle Assyrian king Adad-nirari I

The foot soldiers appear to have been divided into the sạ bū ša kakkē ("weapon troops") and the sạ bū ša arâtē ("shield-bearing troops"). Surviving inscriptions do not specify what kind of weaponry these soldiers carried. In lists of the troops in armies, the sạ bū ša kakkē appear opposite the chariots, whereas the sạ bū ša arâtē appear opposite to the archers. It is possible that the sạ bū ša kakkē included ranged troops, such as slingers (ṣābū ša ušpe) and archers (ṣābū ša qalte). The chariots were a separate component of the army. Based on surviving depictions, chariots were crewed by two soldiers: an archer who commanded the chariot (māru damqu) and a driver (ša mugerre). Chariots were not used extensively before the time of Tiglath-Pileser I, who put particular emphasis on the chariots not just as a combat unit but also as the vehicle to be used by the king. Clear evidence of the special strategic importance of chariots comes from chariots forming their own branch of the army whereas cavalry (ša petḫalle) did not. When used, cavalry was often simply employed for escorting or message deliveries. Further specialized combat roles existed, including the sappers (ša nēpeše), particularly useful at sieges.

Military officials and generals, included individuals appointed to positions termed sukkallu, sukkallu rabi’u, tartennu and nāgiru. Generals were generally recruited from officials in the royal administration, not the common soldiers. Some appointed generals used the title kiṣri ("captain"). The personnel of the baggage train, not partaking in active combat, also included a variety of people with different positions and duties.

== Society ==
=== Population and culture ===
==== Social classes ====
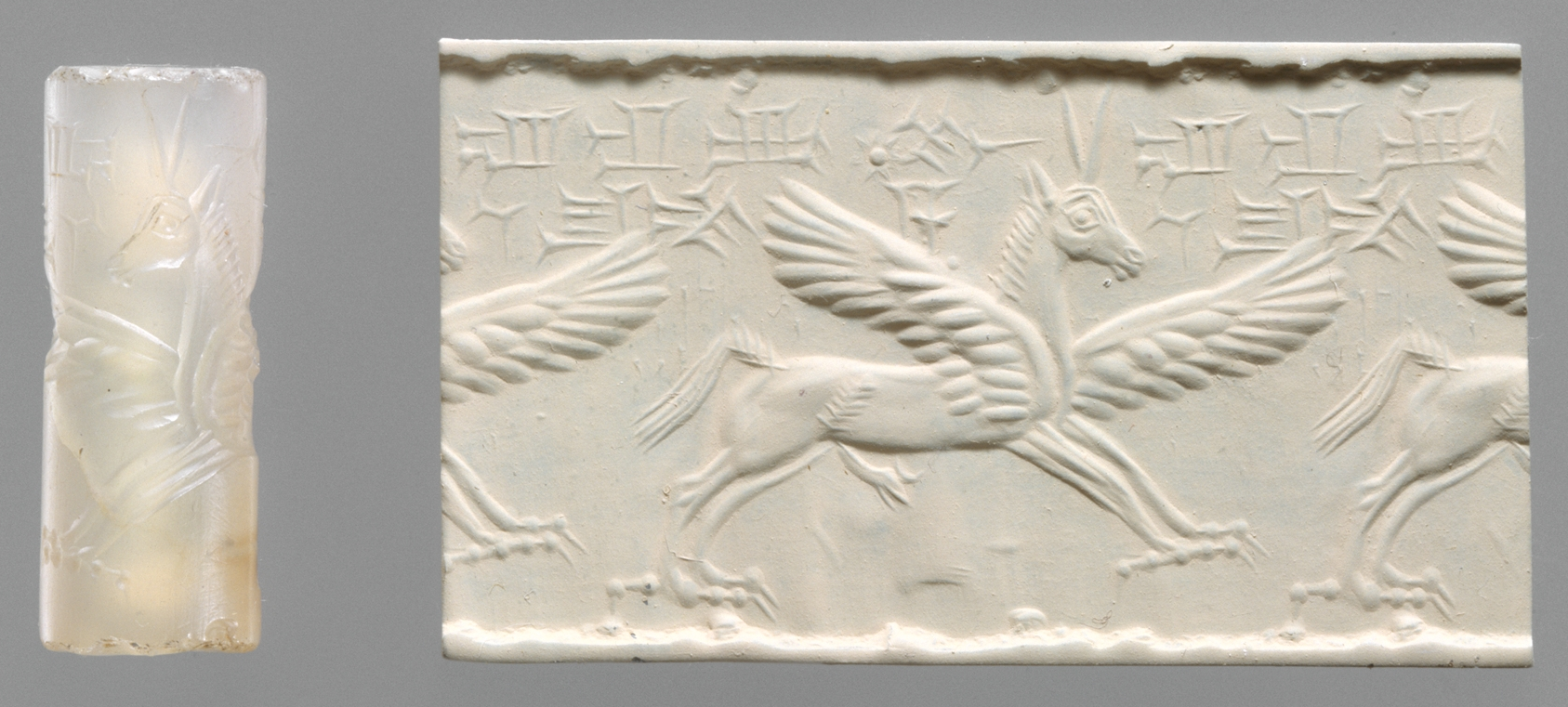
Middle Assyrian cylinder seal, and modern impression, depicting a winged horse

Because of the limited surviving material, information regarding social life and living conditions of the Middle Assyrian period is generally available in detail only for the socio-economic elite and upper classes of society. At the top of Middle Assyrian society were members of long-established and large families, called "houses", who tended to occupy the most important offices within the government. These houses were in many cases the descendants of the most prominent merchant families of the Old Assyrian period. It is clear from surviving documents that corruption among royal officials, who at times used the resources provided to them by the Assyrian government to generate private profits, was a large problem. Corruption was viewed as high treason, with officials accused of using royal funds for their own personal gain simultaneously being accused of hating the king. On the other hand, officials were at times expected to provide some of their own personal funds to public institutions if the king commanded them to. In addition to the funds granted to them by the government, high officials could generate money in various other ways. They could for instance loan money to private individuals and charge highly unfavorable interests, sometimes amounting to up to 100 percent, in addition to demanding goods such as sheep and vessels. Another source of income was "gifts" (šulmanū), i.e. bribes, from private individuals. In exchange for money, many officials are recorded to have paid extra attention to certain requests made to them or to the royal administration.

The majority of the population, who did not belong to the upper class, had a much lower standard of living. The highest group in terms of classes was the free men (a’ılū), who like the upper classes could receive land in exchange for performing duties for the government, but who could not live on these lands since they were comparably small. Below them were the šiluhlu̮, or unfree men. These people were men who had given up their freedom and entered into the service (mainly agricultural) of others on their own accord, who were in turn provided with rations and clothes. Many of them likely also originated as prisoners of war and foreign deportees. It was possible for a šiluhlu̮ to regain their freedom by providing a substitute who could then fulfill their obligations. Though not wholly different from slavery, surviving documents demonstrate that the šiluhlu̮ were not considered property of their employers but rather of the Assyrian government. In one instance, royal officials are explicitly recorded to have intervened after the death of an employer of šiluhlu̮ to distribute their contracts among his sons and an apparently unrelated individual. Other members of clearly lower social classes included the "village residents" (ālāyû), also depended on the owner of the land they lived on, as well as the ālik ilke (people providing services through the ilku system) and hupšu people, though their position, standing and living standards vis-à-vis each other is not clear.

==== Families and position of women ====
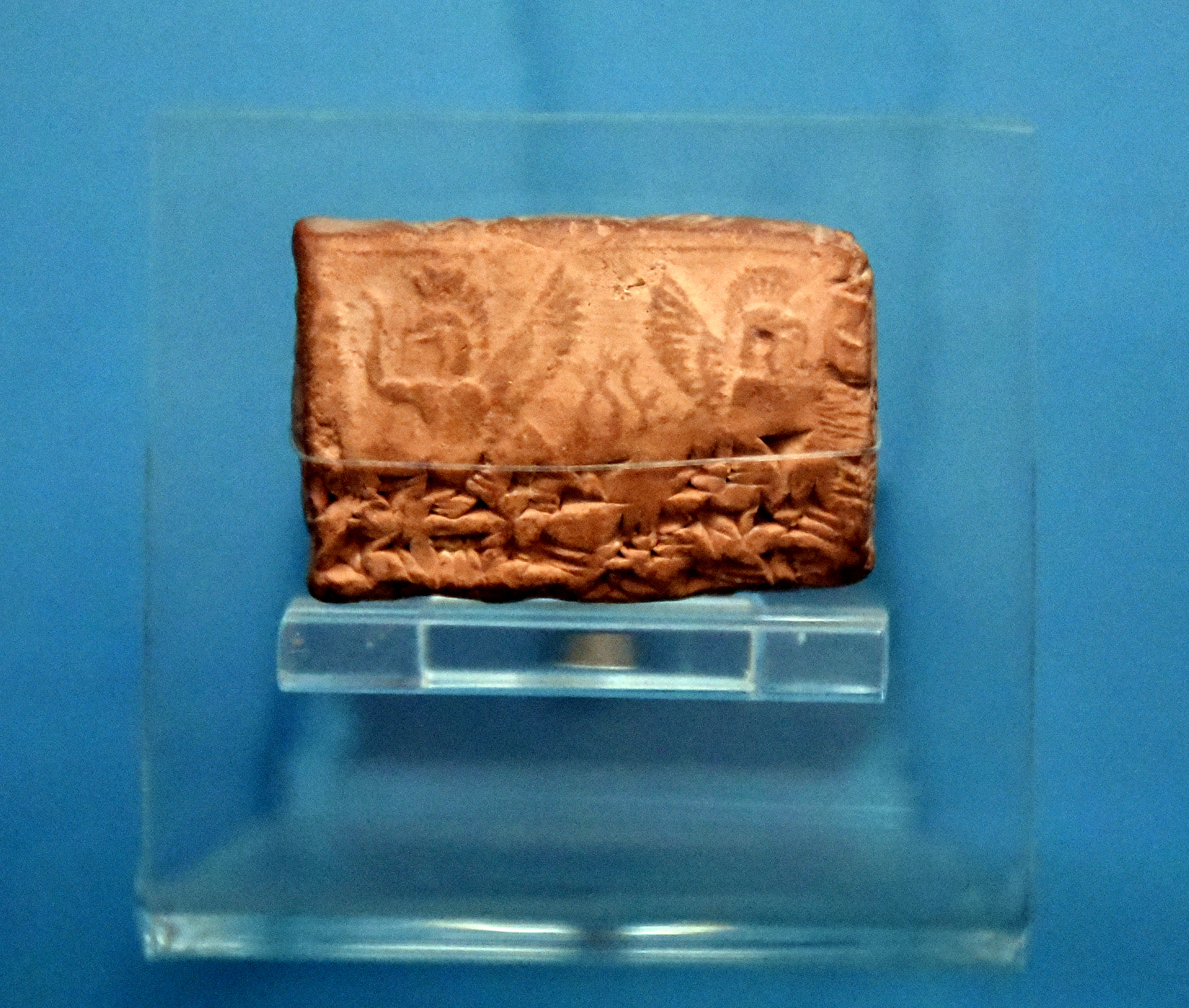
12th-century BC Middle Assyrian cuneiform tablet containing a receipt for a sheep and a goat, payment for a religious purification ritual conducted by an exorcist

Some information on families and living conditions in the Middle Assyrian Empire can be gathered from the preserved Middle Assyrian Laws, as well as from surviving lists of rations and censuses. The norm was that families were relatively small in size. In addition to family members, many households employed various servants. Such servants could be either bought or provided by the Assyrian government. Marriage was rarely decided between the prospective spouses, but instead the result of negotiations between their families. Polygamy was practised by Assyrians, as well as by foreign groups in the empire, such as the Hurrians and Elamites, though many monogamous families are also attested. Censuses and ration lists record members of families by age and sex, chiefly due to this aiding in calculating how much rations should be provided to each family. The head of a household was generally the father, but in the case the father was dead and his eldest son was not yet old enough to take over the role, the mother could also act as a representative of the household.

The social position of women in the Middle Assyrian Empire can be examined in detail due to the laws concerning them in the Middle Assyrian Laws. These laws include punishment for various crimes, often sexual or marital ones. Women's rights in the Middle Assyrian Empire appear to have decreased somewhat since the Old Assyrian period, when women and men had little difference in legal standing and by and large the same legal rights. While out in the street, many women, including widows, wives and concubines, were obligated by law to wear veils. It is uncertain whether these laws were ever strongly enforced. Many women were also prohibited from wearing veils. Certain priestesses (identified as qadiltu priestesses) were only allowed to wear veils if they were married. Slave women and prostitutes (ḫarımtū) were not allowed to wear veils in any circumstance. Children born of a concubine, or someone who was not the primary wife, were lower in status but could still inherit money and property if the "main" marriage remained childless. The status of widowed women depended on whether they were the main or secondary wife and on whether they had children. The Middle Assyrian Laws specify that a woman who lost her husband as a prisoner of war was expected to wait for two years; if she had a father-in-law or a son to support her, she was given no support from the government, but if she was alone and her husband had been a free man, she could appeal for government support by making an application to the "judges" (da”anū), royal officials who were obligated to help her.

==== Ethnic groups ====
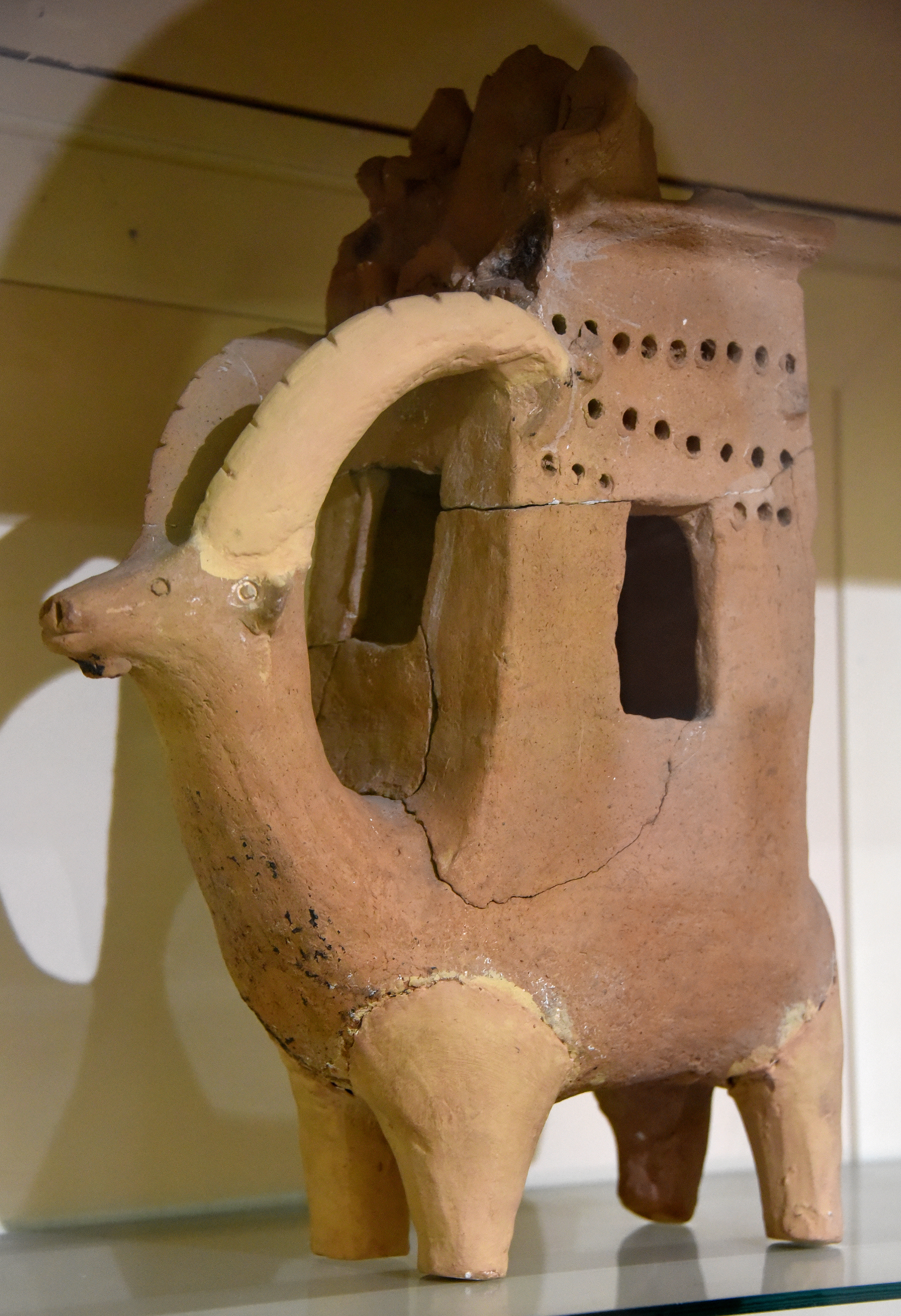
Hurrian incense burner from Lake Dukan, c. 1300–1000 BC

The expansion of the Middle Assyrian Empire, combined with deportations and movements of conquered peoples, led to contact between the Assyrians of the Assyrian heartland and foreign groups growing closer. The most prominent foreign ethnic groups within the Middle Assyrian Empire were the Hurrians (incorporated through conquests in northern Syria), Kassites (descendants of deportees and captives from the Babylonian campaigns) and Arameans. Though many Aramean tribes were fought by the Assyrian kings, others traded with the Assyrians and several Aramean tribes towards the end of the Middle Assyrian period had begun to settle and become well-established within Assyrian borders. People belonging to foreign ethnic groups often contributed with manpower, being employed in construction projects. Though most of them appear to have held inferior positions in society, they also contributed to Assyrian cultural developments with their own cultural traditions.

Ancient Assyrian civilization was relatively open in regards to what an Assyrian was; with a person's fulfillment of obligations (such as military service), their affiliation to the Assyrian Empire and their loyalty to the Assyrian king being the primary factors of being seen as Assyrians, rather than language or ethnic background. As such, there was likely several instances of gradual assimilation of some conquered peoples, who after just a few generations may not have identified as anything other than Assyrians.

=== Language ===
The ancient Assyrians primarily spoke and wrote the Assyrian language, a Semitic language (i.e. related to modern Hebrew and Arabic) closely related to Babylonian, spoken in southern Mesopotamia. Both Assyrian and Babylonian are generally regarded by modern scholars to be distinct dialects of the Akkadian language. This is a modern convention as contemporary ancient authors considered Assyrian and Babylonian to be two separate languages; only Babylonian was referred to as akkadûm, with Assyrian being referred to as aššurû or aššurāyu. Though both were written with cuneiform script, the signs look quite different and can be distinguished relatively easily.

The Middle Assyrian textual record is somewhat spotty and what is known mainly comes from libraries in Assur and Kar-Tukulti-Ninurta. As such, many stages of the language still poorly documented. Though a large number of texts are known from the 13th and 12th centuries BC, texts from after the reign of Tiglath-Pileser I are very rare. The Middle Assyrian form of the Assyrian language was not the only language to be employed in the Middle Assyrian Empire. Though most often used in letters, legal documents and administrative documents, the contemporary Babylonian dialect was often used for royal inscriptions and literature. In Middle Assyrian texts from the royal archives, the most official documents, such as laws, decrees and descriptions of coronations, are all written in the Middle Assyrian language, with Babylonian, as in other cases, being reserved only for royal inscriptions and literature. In some scholarly sources from the Middle Assyrian period, the ancient Sumerian language was employed alongside more modern versions of Akkadian.

=== Road system ===
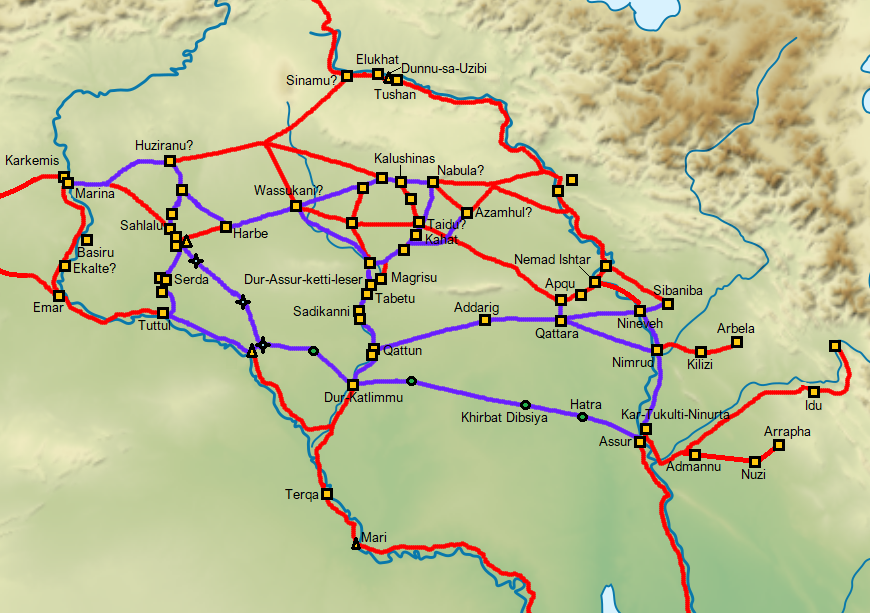
Approximate map of the Middle Assyrian road system. The roads in purple are archaeologically attested and the roads in red are also likely to have existed.

A sophisticated Assyrian imperial road system was created in the Middle Assyrian period. Though extensive road systems must have been employed in older civilizations as well, such as by the Hittites and Egyptians, the Middle Assyrian road system is the as of yet the earliest known such road system in the Ancient Near East, its creation perhaps stemming from the trading expertise of the Assyrians in the preceding Old Assyrian period. The road system of the Middle Assyrian Empire was the direct precursor of the sophisticated road systems of the succeeding Neo-Assyrian, Neo-Babylonian and Achaemenid empires.

The Middle Assyrian road system was mainly established through creating facilities along existing routes. Contemporary Assyrian sources refer to the network of roads as harran sarri ("the king's roads"). Construction of new roads and extensive renovations of old roads appear to have been rather limited, probably because it was not needed since the ancient roads in the region were still in good condition. Only two stone bridges are securely attested to have been built in this period, one at Khorsabad and the other at Nineveh, with wooden bridges perhaps being used in other places. The new facilities, relay stations or rest stops, provided nourishment, accommodation for travellers, and additional horses if the need arose. Though the distance between stations is not entirely clear from the surviving sources, it appears that many stations were placed at distances from each other equal to about a day's journey by chariot, perhaps amounting to intervals of about 30 kilometers (18.7 miles).

The road system was an important factor in Middle Assyrian success as it improved communication channels within the empire. The most frequent users of the roads, at least in terms of appearances in the surviving source material, were members of the Assyrian administration; couriers of officials and royal messengers, sometimes accompanied by an escort for protection. The roads are also known to have been used by foreign messengers and by private individuals not associated with the Assyrian government due to their appearances in documents describing the rations provided to them. Many travellers travelled in carriages or chariots, but many also travelled on foot.

== Religion ==
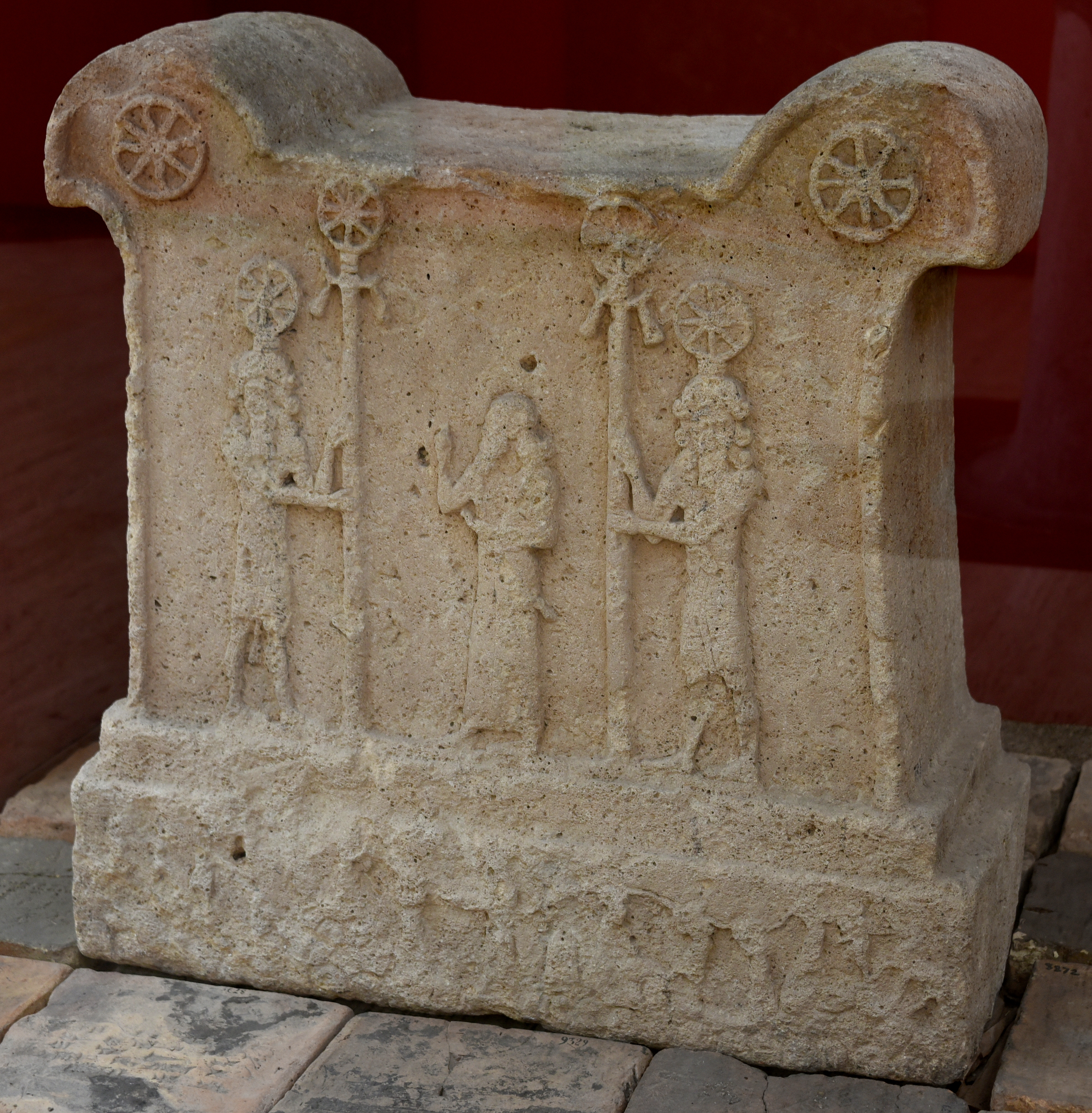
A temple altar from Assur, made in the reign of Tukulti-Ninurta I

The Assyrians worshipped the same pantheon of gods as the Babylonians in southern Mesopotamia. The chief Assyrian deity was the national deity Ashur. Though the deity and the city are commonly distinguished by modern historians through calling the god Ashur and the city Assur, both were inscribed in the exact same way in ancient times (Aššur). In documents from the preceding Old Assyrian period, the city and god are often not clearly differentiated, which suggests that Ashur originated sometime in the Early Assyrian period as a deified personification of the city itself. Ashur's role as a deity was flexible and changed with the changing culture and politics of the Assyrians themselves. In the Old Assyrian period, Ashur was mainly regarded as a god of death and revival, related to agriculture. In the Middle Assyrian Empire, Ashur's role had been thoroughly altered. Possibly originating as a reaction to the period of suzerainty under the Mittani kingdom, Middle Assyrian theology presented Ashur as a god of war, who bestowed the Assyrian kings not only with divine legitimacy, something retained from the Old Assyrian period, but also commanded the kings to enlarge the "land of Ashur" with Ashur's "just scepter", i.e. expand the Assyrian Empire through military conquest.

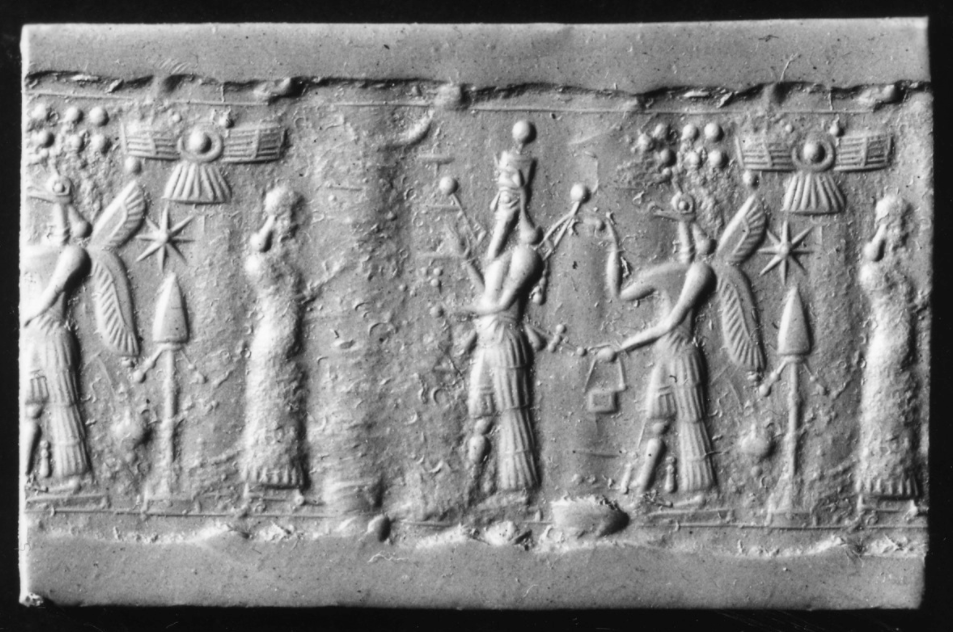
Impression of a Middle Assyrian cylinder seal, depicting a religious scene

It is possible that the dominant military role of Ashur in the Middle Assyrian period was the result of the theology promulgated by the Amorite conqueror Shamshi-Adad I, who conquered Assur in the 19th century BC. Shamshi-Adad replaced the decaying original temple of Ashur in Assur with a new temple dedicated to the chief god of the Mesopotamian pantheon, Enlil. Since Shamshi-Adad also respected Ashur, and his temple was in later times used as a temple of Ashur, it is probable that Shamshi-Adad equated Enlil with Ashur. This equation might have been what resulted in later Assyrians viewing Ashur as "king of the gods", a role previous civilizations in both northern and southern Mesopotamia ascribed to Enlil. The development of equating Ashur with Enlil, or at least transferring Enlil's role to Ashur, was parallelled in Babylon, where the previously unimportant local god Marduk was elevated in the reign of Hammurabi (18th century BC) to the head of the pantheon, modeled after Enlil.

The importance and implications of the equation of Ashur with Enlil, the old Sumerian king of the gods, is first apparent in the Middle Assyrian period. The goods sent by every province of the Middle Assyrian Empire to Assur to be a part of the offerings to Ashur demonstrates that it was seen as important that the basic care of the god was jointly carried out by every part of the empire. This helps explain why the empire as a whole was designated as māt Aššur, the "land of Ashur", since all parts of the land fed the god and the god in turn embodied the land. All parts of an empire donating goods for offering was not a new idea; it had for instance been employed under the Third Dynasty of Ur (c. 2112–2004 BC), though in that case the offerings were sent to Nippur and were for Enlil. The development of Ashur into a unifying god for the entire empire through the offerings likely strengthened Assyrian identity among all social classes as it brought them together as people of the god.

== See also ==
- History of Mesopotamia
- List of Mesopotamian dynasties
