= Kar-Tukulti-Ninurta =

Historical Mesopotamian settlement

Coordinates: 35.494685°N 43.270008°E

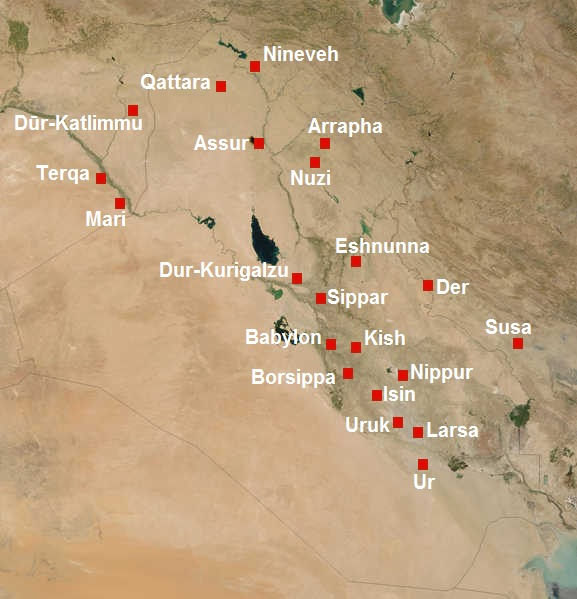
Mesopotamia in 2nd millennium BC (Place names in French)

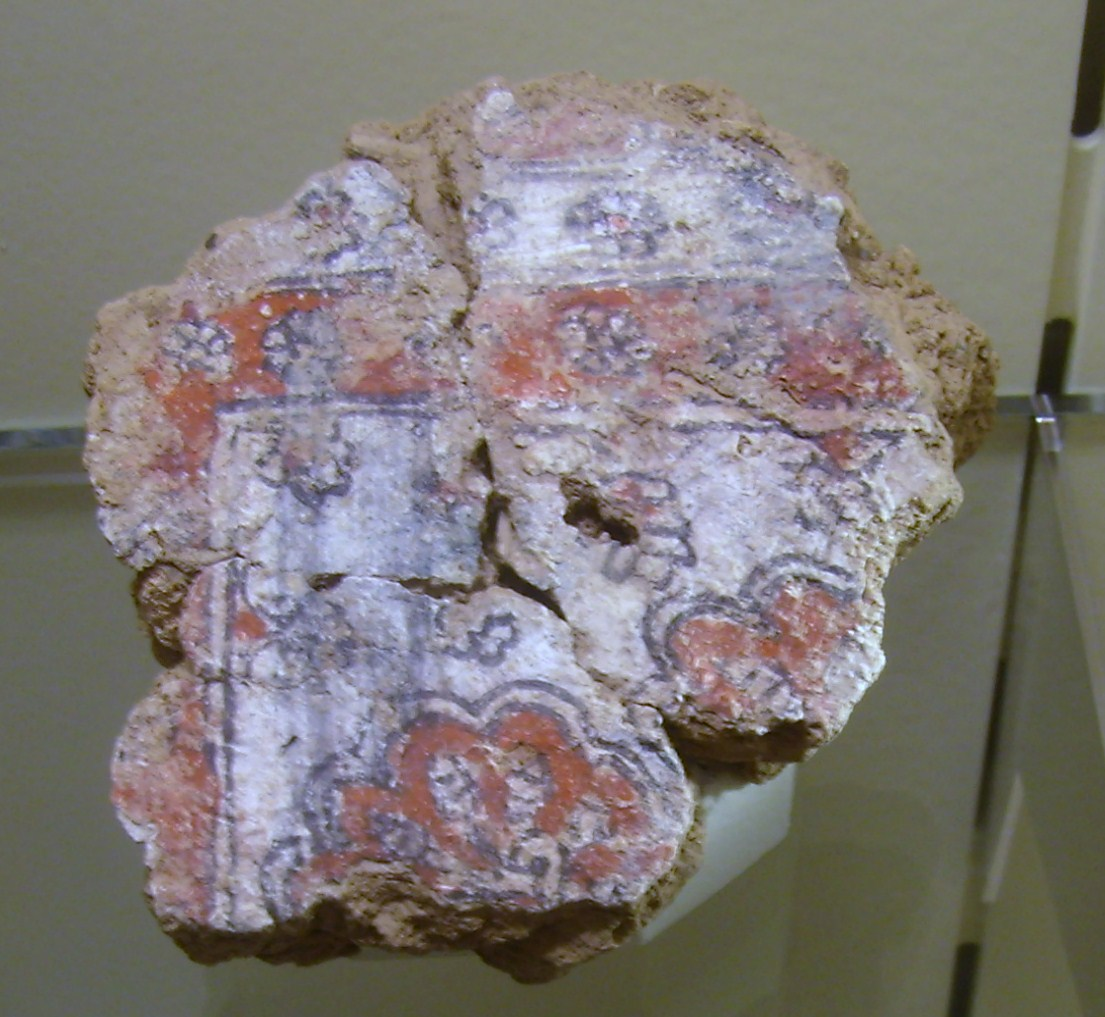
Fragment of a wall painting from the palace at Kar-Tukulti-Ninurta

Kar-Tukulti-Ninurta (modern Tulul ul Aqar (Telul al-Aqr) in Salah al-Din Governorate, Iraq) was a new cult center for Ashur and perhaps a new capital city founded by the Assyrian king Tukulti-Ninurta I (about 1243–1207 BC) just north of Assur. Its name meant "Port Tukulti-Ninurta".

== History ==
Kar-Tukulti-Ninurta was a new foundation about 3 km (1.9 mi) north of Assur, which was the old capital of the Assyrian empire. Kar-Tukulti-Ninurta was placed on the eastern bank of the river Tigris. The walled area of the town was about 800 by 800 meters in size. In the middle there was a wall dividing the city into a western and eastern part. In the western part, near to the river, a temple was excavated for the Assyrian main deity, Ashur. The temple complex, measuring about 53 by 90 meters had a zikkurat on its western side. In the zikkurat was found a text identifying the temple as the temple of Ashur and also providing an identification of the city (the city was already before the excavations known from other texts). From further texts it is known that the cult image of the god was moved from Assur to this temple.

North of the temple stood the royal palace. The palace was placed on a platform, originally about 18m high. All remains of the palace building on the platform are lost, although many wall paintings were found. They show that the palace was richly decorated. Next to the palace a second, badly preserved palace building was found. Perhaps this was the entrance for a bigger palace complex, incorporating both palaces.

The city was largely abandoned after the death of king Tukulti-Ninurta I with minor occupation continuing through the Neo-Assyrian period. The cult image of Ashur was brought back to Assur.

== Archaeology ==
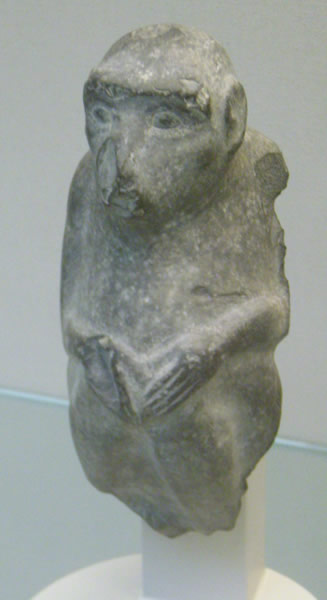
stone figure of a monkey from Kar-Tukulti-Ninurta

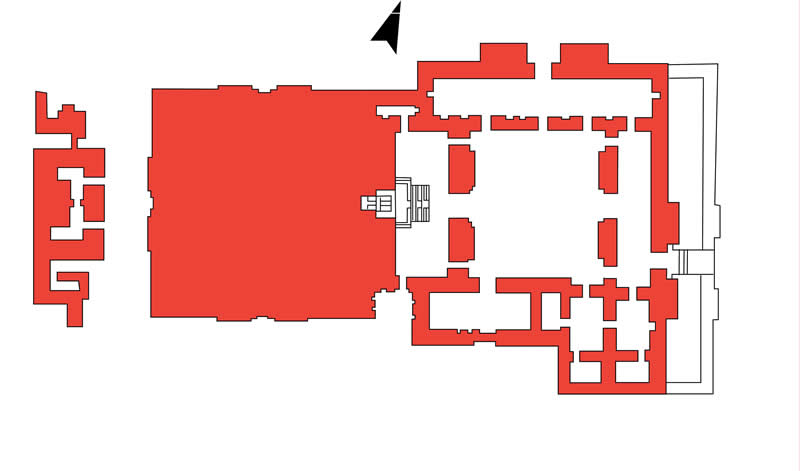
Plan of the Ashur temple

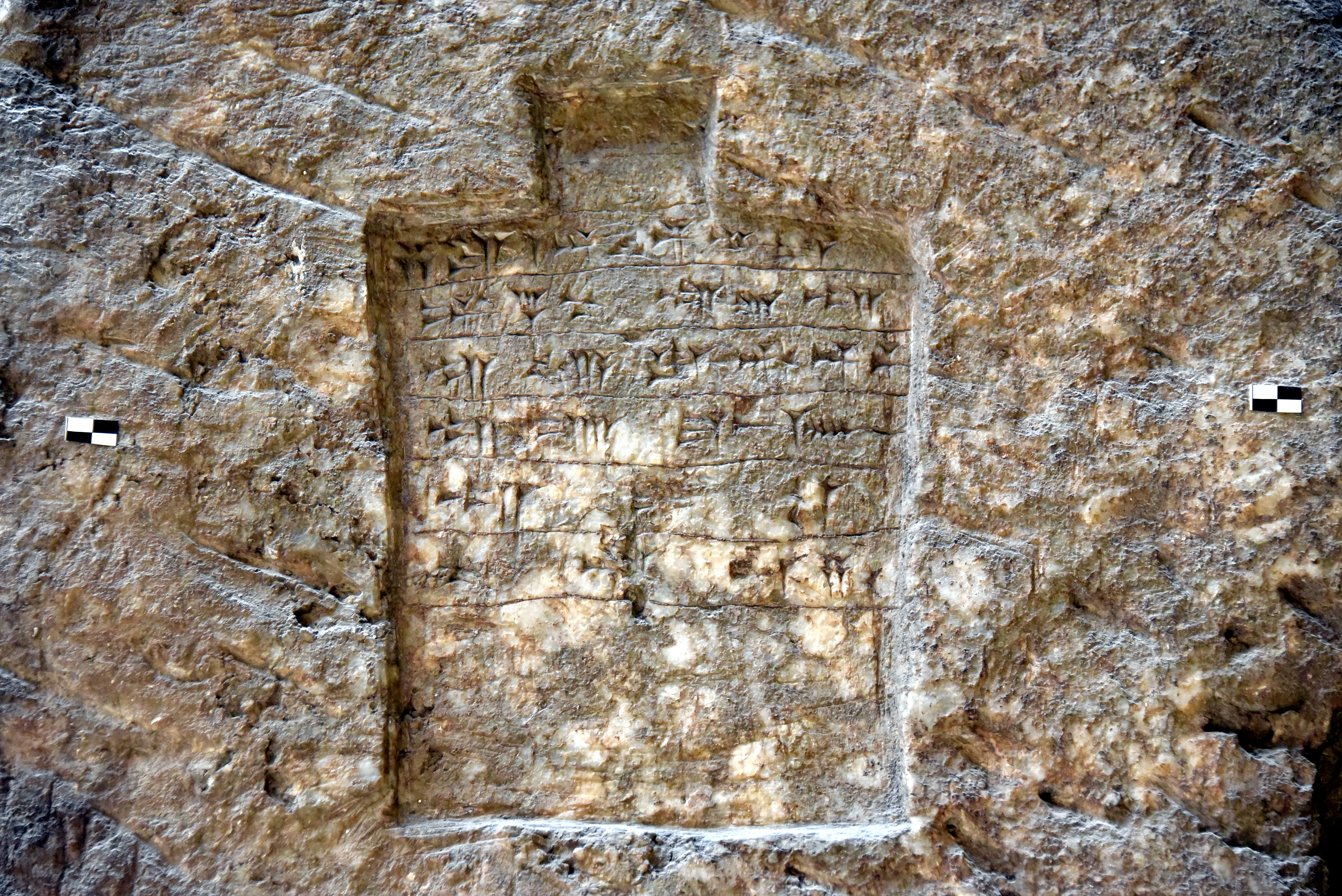
Stele of Adad-bel ukin, governor of Libbi-ali, Kar-Tukulti-Ninurta, Ekallatum, Itu, and Ruqahu. From Assur, Iraq. 780 BCE. Pergamon Museum

Kar-Tukulti-Ninurta was first excavated from 1913 to 1914 by a German team from the Deutsche Orient-Gesellschaft (German Oriental Company) led by Walter Bachmann which was working at the same time at Assur. The finds are now in the Pergamon Museum in Berlin, in the British Museum and in Istanbul. Bachmann did not publish his results and his field notes were lost. A full excavation report appeared only in 1985

Work at the site was resumed in 1986 with a survey by a team from the German Research Foundation led by R. Dittman. A season of excavation was conducted in 1989. The survey showed that the site, which was thought to cover only 62 hectares, actually extended out to at least 240 hectares.

== See also ==
- Cities of the ancient Near East
- Short chronology timeline
