= Arinnu =

Arinnu was an ancient Assyrian city near Mount Aisa in Mesopotamia that was destroyed at least twice.

According to the annals of Shalmaneser I, discovered at Assur, it was an ancient Assyrian city on the Tigris and traditional capital of Assyria, near the modern city of Al-Shirqat in Iraq. He destroyed the fortress of Arinnu, "the dust of which he brought to Assur."

After it was "razed to the ground," the Assyrians re-built their capital city.

It was placed under siege a second time by Tiglath-pileser I, but the city surrendered voluntarily that time and was spared destruction after they promised tribute (bribes and taxes).

It was later controlled by Shubria.

== Toponymy ==
The origin of the name is probably from the Hurrian language, an ancient language of the Hurro-Urartian languages. This might indicate that the city of Arinnu is even older than attested in written annals, and was originally a settlement of the Hurrians. Arinnu was a Sun goddess of the Hurrian pantheon.
