= King of Hanigalbat =

- šar Ḫanigalbat

Details
- First monarch: Ibashi-ili
- Last monarch: Unknown
- Formed: 13th century BCE
- Abolished: 12th–7th century BCE
- Appointer: Appointment, hereditary

The king of Hanigalbat (Akkadian: šar Ḫanigalbat) or king of the land of Hanigalbat (šar māt Ḫanigalbat) was an Assyrian vassal ruler, essentially a viceroy, in the territory of the Kingdom of Mitanni, also known as Hanigalbat, following its conquest by the Middle Assyrian king Shalmaneser I. The kings of Hanigalbat were members of the Assyrian royal family and also held the title of grand vizier (sukallu rabi'u). Though vassals under their relatives in Assyria, they held sway over virtually the entire western Assyrian Empire. The title, as rendered in Akkadian, was identical to the title applied to the kings of Mitanni by the Assyrians, suggesting that it might have been intended to imply that the Mitanni kingdom continued to exist as a vassal state of the Assyrians.

== History ==
=== Kings of Hanigalbat ===
After conquering the Mitanni kingdom in the 13th century BCE and establishing administrative districts there, the Middle Assyrian king Shalmaneser I named his brother, Ibashi-ili, as grand vizier (sukallu rabi'u) and king of Hanigalbat. The title šar māt Ḫanigalbat was identical to the title used for the Mitanni kings by the Assyrians. The title might intentionally have implied that the conquered Mitanni territories had vassal-like status (rather than being fully incorporated) as a way to appease the locals. The Assyriologist Masamichi Yamada wrote in 2011 that he believed that the kings of Hanigalbat were relatively autonomous, their realm, which he designated as "Assyrian Hanigalbat" (as opposed to the earlier Mitanni kingdom, "Hurrian Hanigalbat"), being a satellite state rather than a full vassal kingdom.

The role of Ibashshi-ili and his successors was comparable to that of a viceroy, being tasked with acting as the local legal authority, hosting passing-by officials, collecting taxes and supplying them to the Assyrian capital as well as overseeing certain military and policing duties. From their seat at Dur-Katlimmu, their authority extended throughout multiple districts within the territory of the former Mitanni kingdom, covering the entire western part of the Middle Assyrian Empire, from the Khabur in the east to the Euphrates in the west, and from Terqa in the south to the mountains in the north. All of Ibašši-ilī's successors descended from his own dynastic line and continued to carry both the title of king of Hanigalbat and the title of grand vizier.

Though they are often ignored in historiography, it is possible that the line of kings in Hanigalbat constituted a junior line of Assyrian co-rulers, with authority and prestige beyond simply being viceroys. A Middle Assyrian-age letter from the Babylonian king Adad-shuma-usur is addressed to the "kings of Assyria" rather than the "king of Assyria, a possible reference to there being two simultaneous kings. Another Babylonian letter, this one to Ibašši-ilī, explicitly referred to him as the "king of Assyria".

=== Abolition ===
It is unclear when the office of king of Hanigalbat was abolished. In 2015, the Assyriologist Rafał Koliński wrote that the title fell into disuse already when Ninurta-apal-Ekur, a great-great-grandson of Ibašši-ilī, usurped the Assyrian throne in the 12th century BCE. In 2008, the historian Jeffrey J. Szuchman wrote that the title, and the administrative system surrounding it, probably lasted throughout the Middle Assyrian Empire and possibly to as late as the 10th century BCE. In 2003, the Assyriologist Stephanie Dalley wrote that the title and position lasted until near the end of the Assyrian Empire and that the vassal rulers of Hanigalbat were influential in the Assyrian succession. When the Neo-Assyrian king Sennacherib was murdered, his son and intended successor Esarhaddon was in the west and only successfully took the Assyrian throne in Nineveh with the help of an army raised in Hanigalbat. Dalley believes the line of kings in Hanigalbat came to an end at some point during the war between Sinsharishkun and Nabopolassar, which also resulted in the collapse of the Assyrian Empire as a whole, as during the late stage of the war the only royal seats mentioned are Nineveh and Babylon. In 622 BCE, Assyrian records tell that a "general" in the empire's western provinces, whose name is not recorded, took advantage of the war and seized Nineveh, ruling there for a hundred days before Sinsharishkun returned and defeated him. The general had taken the city without fighting since the Assyrian army had surrendered before him, indicating that he might have been a member of the royal family, or at least a person that would be acceptable as king.

== Known kings and grand viziers ==
- Ibashi-ili, son of the Assyrian king Adad-nirari I, appointed as the first king of Hanigalbat by his brother, Shalmaneser I.
- Qibi-Ashur, son of Ibashi-ili.
- Ashur-iddin, son of Qibi-Ashur. Active during the early reign of Tukulti-Ninurta I in Assyria.
  - Shulmanu-mushabshi, attested only as grand vizier (not king of Hanigalbat), between Ashur-iddin and Ili-ipadda. Possibly a member of their family.
- Ili-ipadda, son of Ashur-iddin. Active during the late reign of Tukulti-Ninurta I, and the reigns of his successors Ashur-nadin-apli and Ashur-nirari III in Assyria.
  - There are records of a grand vizier of Ibašši-ilī's line in the reign of Ashur-dan I, the successor of Ninurta-apal-Ekur.
