= Adad-shuma-usur =

Adad-šuma-uṣur
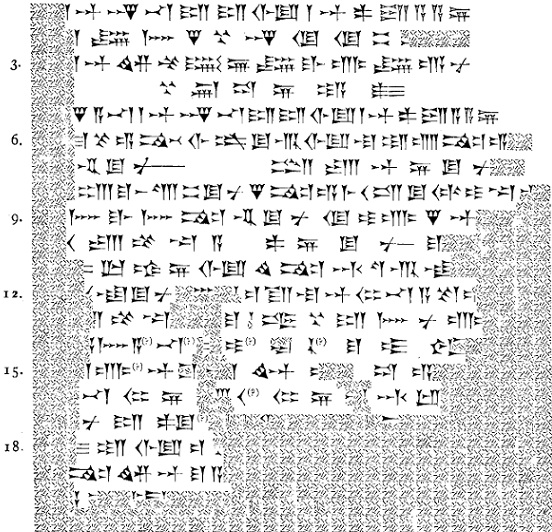
- Adad-šuma-uṣur's rude letter to Aššur-nirari III and Ilī-ḫaddâ, the "Kings of Assyria." (Note: Letter to Aššur-nirari and Ilī-ḫaddâ, tablet K. 3045, published as ABL 924.)

King of Babylon
- Reign: 30 regnal years c. 1217–1187 BC
- Predecessor: Adad-šuma-iddina
- Successor: Meli-Šipak II
- Died: c. 1187 BC
- Issue: Meli-Shipak II
- House: Kassite

Adad-šuma-uṣur, inscribed ^{d}IM-MU-ŠEŠ, meaning "O Adad, protect the name!," and dated very tentatively c. 1217–1187 BC, was the 32nd king of the 3rd or Kassite dynasty of Babylon and the country contemporarily known as Karduniaš. His name was wholly Babylonian and not uncommon, as for example the later Assyrian King Esarhaddon (681–669 BC) had a personal exorcist, or ašipu, with the same name who was unlikely to have been related. He is best known for his rude letter to Aššur-nirari III, the most complete part of which is quoted below, and was enthroned following a revolt in the south of Mesopotamia when the north was still occupied by the forces of Assyria. He may not have assumed authority throughout the country until around the 25th year of his 30-year reign, although the exact sequence of events and chronology remains disputed.

== Biography ==
There is surprisingly little contemporary evidence for this king considering the purported length of his reign, which was the longest recorded in the Kassite dynasty. The tablet known as King List A (Note: King List A, BM 33332, column 2, lines 8-11.) shows him following Adad-šuma-iddina and his predecessor-but-one, Enlil-nadin-šumi, but in Chronicle P (Note: Chronicle P, (ABC 22), BM 92701, column 4, lines 8 and 9.) he makes his appearance in the narrative before them. Brinkman argues that this is for stylistic purposes but the Walker Chronicle (Note: Walker Chronicle, ABC 25, BM 27796, lines 2-4.) suggests a simpler explanation. Adad-šuma-uṣur was elevated to the position of king in the south of the country years before he conquered Babylon and made himself its king. The early part of his reign may well have been concurrent with that of the three kings preceding him on King List A, but it is quite probable that he followed them in ascending the throne of the city of Babylon. It is a characteristic trait of this tablet that concurrent kings and dynasties are presented successively as if one followed another.

=== Contemporary evidence ===
Nippur inscriptions of Adad-šuma-uṣur

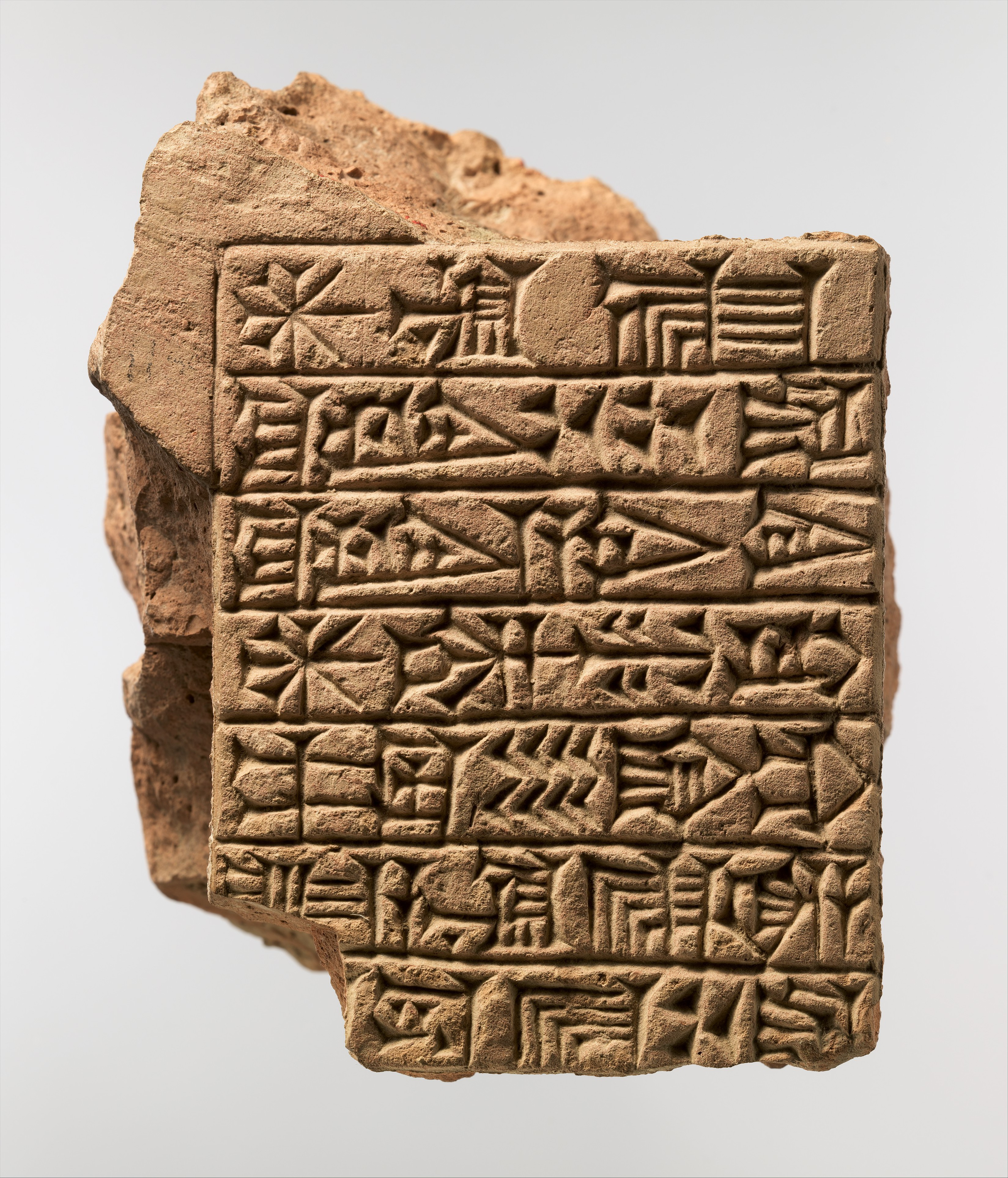
The Nippur brick in the Metropolitan Museum of Art

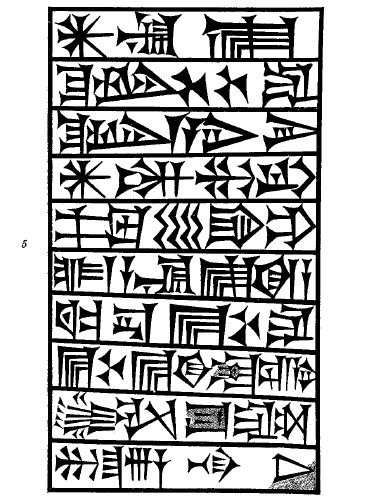
Transcription of the inscription of Adad-šuma-uṣur recording work on the Ekur in Nippur. (Note: Stamped brick CBS 8643.)

A late copy of an inscription on a bronze statue from Ur, (Note: BM 36042.) begins “When Anu and Enlil looked with steady favour on Adad-šuma-uṣur, the shepherd who pleased their heart, at that time Marduk, the great lord, named his name as ruler of (all) land[s],” supporting the theory that he reigned in Uruk and Nippur before being appointed by Marduk in Babylon.

The brevity of his reign over Babylon proper also explains the minimal contemporary inscriptions found. Only sixteen dated economic or legal texts attest to his reign, with just two of them from Babylon, bearing the curious double-dating formula adopted by Adad-šuma-uṣur and his immediate successors. These are inscribed 7 KAM 3 KAM (Note: B. 69 formerly Div. 304.) and 9 KAM 3 KAM, (Note: B. 70 formerly Div. 305.) speculated to represent his 27th and 29th years. Twelve of the extant tablets have provenance from excavation at Ur. The earliest of these is dated (Note: Tablet Museum reference IM 85543 excavation reference U 7787d, Certificate of sheep plucking.) to his 3rd year and records that Šamaš-zēra-šubši had inspected and “plucked” 103 sheep. Much of the remainder concern cattle, their sale and the legal actions taken to secure recompense for their theft. The determination of innocence or guilt was often arbitrated by “river ordeal,” a process still poorly understood. In two documents, (Note: Tablet Museum reference IM 85482, excavation reference U 7787e, and UET V 259, terms of reference for trial by ordeal.) the judge was Adad-šuma-uṣur, the šakkanakku, “appointee, governor,” a role similarly adopted by his predecessor Šagarakti-Šuriaš (Note: CBS 4579.) and two other texts (Note: IM 85515, three cases of cattle theft, and IM 85514, a second document relating to case 1.) feature the same group of miscreants, Abu-ṭābu, Zēru-kīnu and Sîn-pūtu, suspects in three separate cases of cattle rustling.

The cities of Nippur, Dur, Isin and Marad had been sacked by the marauding Elamites under their king, Kidin-Hutran III, and two of these, Nippur and Isin were the subjects of construction work by Adad-šuma-uṣur. Bricks from Isin were excavated in 1975/76 with a Sumerian inscription recording his work on the Egalmaḫ and also earlier from Nippur recording work on the Ekur (example text pictured). He had been credited with rebuilding the walls of Nippur in the Walker Chronicle.

=== Under Tukulti-Ninurta I’s reign ===
Tukulti-Ninurta I, the king of Assyria, had captured Adad-šuma-uṣur's predecessor, Kaštiliašu IV, on one of his two campaigns and conquered Babylon during the second one, perhaps around 1225 BC. He had taken the Babylonian kingship and then ruled there probably through governors, for seven years. There is an economic text (Note: Tablet Ni. 65, dated: ˹ITI˺.ŠE ˹U_{4}7˺.KAM, ˹MU˺.SAG.NAM.LUGAL.LA, TUKUL-ti-^{d}MAŠ, “Month of Addaru, seventh day, accession year (of) Tukulti-Ninurta.”) from Nippur dated to his accession year. When exactly the three native kings, Enlil-nādin-šumi, Kadašman-Ḫarbe II and Adad-šuma-iddina succeeded one another is still uncertain, but their short reigns totalled around nine years. Yamada, for example, argues that Tukulti-Ninurta only ascended the Babylonian throne after their reigns. Others place his rule before them, or propose the first two ruled in the two-year period between Tukulti-Ninurta's two campaigns. Walker suggest that after them, it seems likely that Tukulti-Ninurta's successors appointed governors over Babylon until they fled in the face of Adad-šuma-uṣur's triumph over the Assyrian king Enlil-kudurri-usur fifteen years or so after Tukulti-Ninurta died at the hand of assassins in his eponymous city.

Adad-šuma-uṣur had been “put on his father’s throne” by a rebellion against Tukulti-Ninurta among the Akkadian officers. Most of the contemporary economic texts dated to his reign come from Ur, suggesting the location of his investiture. The identity of his father is never explicitly stated in the chronicle but it was assumed in antiquity to have been Kaštiliašu IV. A Luristan bronze dagger in the Foroughi Collection is inscribed with his filiation to this king, and this claim may have helped reinforce his legitimacy. It reads: ša ^{d}IŠKUR-MU-URÙ, LUGAL KIŠ, DUMU Kaš-til-ia-šu, LUGAL KÁ.DINGIR.RA^{ki}, “(property) of Adad-šuma-uṣur, king of the world, son of Kaštiliašu, king of Babylon.”

Tukulti-Ninurta wrote a letter to the Hittite king, thought to be Suppiluliuma II, four fragments (Note: Letter from Tukulti-Ninurta to Suppiluliuma II, Kbo 28.61–64.) of which were discovered at the site of excavations of Ḫattuša in the 1930s. It was dated to the limmu year of Ilī-padâ, in the latter part of Tukulti-Ninurta's reign. In it, he recaps the genealogy of the recent Kassite dynasty, mentioning Kurigalzu II, Kadašman-Enlil II and Kudur-Enlil then apparently castigating Šagarakti-Šuriaš, the “non-son of Kudur-Enlil”, and his sons, one of whom, Kaštiliašu, had provoked the war by his dastardly pre-emptive strike against Assyria. In one place, the sons of Šagarakti-Šuriaš have been killed, almost certainly by none other than Tukulti-Ninurta himself. He then makes reference to a “servant of Suhi”, where Suhu is a region of northeast Syria, and Itamar Singer proposes this individual to be Adad-šuma-uṣur, the implication being he was a foreigner, not of the royal stock and consequently unqualified for office.

A letter from an Elamite king, (Note: Literary letter from Elamite King to Kassite court, tablet VAT 17020.) thought to be Shutruk-Nahhunte, to the Kassite elders demanding the right to the Babylonian throne through blood, describes Adad-šuma-uṣur as “son of Dunna-Sah, from the region by the bank of the Euphrates”, in his criticism of their choice of regent. Unfortunately the Tukulti-Ninurta tablet is fragmentary and the text barely readable so a variety of restorations are possible. The letter ends with a plea for military aid and a moving, “If I am alive, [I will send(?)] a message of/about my life, but if I am dead, the message of/about my death [will be sent to you(?)]”, “one hundred years, my brother[...” and “you have loved me with all your heart.”

=== Letter to Aššur-nirari III ===
Tukulti-Ninurta, who “carried criminal designs against Babylon,” was succeeded by his son and possible assassin Aššur-nadin-apli, but whose brief reign was succeeded in turn by his son, Aššur-nirari III. He was the recipient of an extremely offensive letter from Adad-šuma-uṣur, which he addressed to “the Assyrian kings,” putting Aššur-nirari on an equal footing with his subordinate for added insult, a fragment of which has fortuitously survived:

[The god Ash]ur to Aššur-nirari and Ilī-ḫaddâ [...through] slovenliness, drunkenness, and indecisiveness, things have taken a turn for the worse for you. Now there is neither sense nor reason in your heads. Since the great [gods] have driven you mad you speak [...]. Your faces [.....with] iniquitous and criminal counsel

— Adad-šuma-uṣur, letter to Aššur-nirari and Ilī-ḫaddâ

The Ilī-ḫaddâ mentioned is Ilī-padā, the viceroy of Hanigalbat, Ashur-nirari's distant relative (sharing a common ancestor in Eriba-Adad I), and father of the later Assyrian king, Ninurta-apal-Ekur. He had been the eponymous official (limmu) for the year in which Tukulti-Ninurta's letter was sent to the Hittite king. The letter was carefully copied and preserved in the library at Nineveh. Grayson speculates it was kept to “goad” the Assyrians to vengeance.

=== Battle with Enlil-kudurri-uṣur ===
Ashur-nirari's rule proved to be fairly transitory and he was probably swept aside by his uncle, Enlil-kudurri-usur, another son of Tukulti-Ninurta. Adad-šuma-uṣur “muster]ed [his army] and attacked and defeated him” and then

[...The officers of Assyria] seized [Enlil-kudu]r-usur their lord and gave (him) to Adad-šuma-uṣur. ...the peop]le of Karduniash who had fled to Assyria ...they gave [to Adad-šu]ma-uṣur.

— Walker Chronicle (ABC 25), tablet BM 27796, obverse, lines 5 to 7, in the British Museum.

Following this famous victory, a “son of a nobody, whose name is not mentioned” exploited the chance to enthrone himself in Babylon, so a revolt was propagated and Adad-šuma-uṣur took the city and his place in the Kassite dynastic list. The events were captured for posterity in the Adad-šuma-uṣur Epic, (Note: Adad-šuma-uṣur Epic, BM 34104+.) a late Babylonian historical literary work where a rebellion of officers and nobles is caused by the neglect of Marduk and Babylon. The penitent king confesses his sins to the god and restores his temple, Esagila.

The end of Enlil-kudurri-usur's reign is dated 1193 or 1183 depending on uncertainty about the duration of his successor's, Ninurta-apal-Ekur’s, rule, three or thirteen years. As a son of Ilī-padā, Ninurta-apal-Ekur had exploited Enlil-kudurri-usur’s demise to seize power in Aššur. (Note: Synchronistic History, ABC 21, tablet K.4401b, lines 5 to 8.) He had “(come) up from Karduniaš", where he may conceivably have been the last Assyrian governor of Babylon, as his brother, Mardukīia, was governor of Katmuḫi. The length of his reign does rather crucially determine the likely date range for the beginning of Adad-šuma-uṣur's thirty-year reign, because there is no datable event that takes place at the beginning, such as the passing of a preceding monarch. The interregnum between Babylon's fall to Tukulti-Ninurta and its conquering by Adad-šuma-uṣur had been at least twenty two years and perhaps even more than thirty years.

He was succeeded by his son, Meli-Šipak, who was curiously reluctant to mention his filiation to Adad-šuma-uṣur in his own inscriptions.
