= Ashur-nirari III =

- King of Assyria

King of the Middle Assyrian Empire
- Reign: 6 regnal years 1202–1197 BC (high); 1192-1187 BC (low)
- Predecessor: Ashur-nadin-apli
- Successor: Enlil-kudurri-usur
- Father: Ashur-nadin-apli

Aššur-nerari III, inscribed ^{m}aš-šur-ERIM.GABA, “Aššur is my help,” was king of Assyria (1202–1197 BC or 1192–1187 BC). He was the grandson of Tukulti-Ninurta I and might have succeeded his uncle or more probably his father Ashur-nadin-apli to the throne, who had participated in a conspiracy against Tukulti-Ninurta I which led to his murder.

== Biography ==
According to the Nassouhi Assyrian King List, (Note: Nassouhi list, iii 32: ^{m}Aš-šur-nērārī mār Aš-šur-nādin-ap[li_{2}] 6 MU^{meš}; first published by E. Nassouhi AfO 4 (1927) p. 1–11 and pl. 1f; provenance: Assur.) he was the son of Ashur-nadin-apli, his predecessor in this copy and that from Khorsabad, (Note: Khorsabad list, iii 23: ^{m}Aš-šur-nērārī mār ^{m}˹Aš-šur˺-nāṣir_{2}-apli 6 MU^{meš}; first published by I. J. Gelb JNES 13 (1954) 209–230 and pl. XIVf; provenance: Khorsabad.) although the Khorsabad and SDAS (Note: SDAS list, iii 13: ^{m}Aš-šur-nērārī mār_{2} ^{m}Aš-šur-nāṣir_{2}-apli 6 MU^{meš} published by Gelb with the Khorsabad copy and pl. XVIf; provenance unknown.) variants both give his father as Ashur-naṣir-apli, his predecessor only on the SDAS copy. All three copies agree on his length of reign, an otherwise poorly attested 6 years, following the brief 3 or 4-year reign of his immediate predecessor, suggesting he may have been quite young when he assumed the throne and perhaps explaining the prominence of his grand vizier, Ilī-padâ. Traces of his name also appear on a fourth, small fragment of the kinglist. (Note: Small fragment, first published by O. Schroeder KAV 15; provenance: Assur.) His eponym year, likely to have been his first full year in office, dates a corn loan tablet (Note: KAJ 101 (Urad-serua #55).) from the archive of Urad-Šerūa and his family and a tablet (Note: TabT05A-191.) excavated in Tell Taban, Syria, and dated to the eponym year of Adad-bān-kala, may be of his reign or that of his successor.

A fragment of an extraordinarily insulting letter (Note: Tablet K. 3045 / ABL 924: LUGAL.MEŠ šá KUR aš+šur^{KI}.) is preserved in the Kouyunjik Collections in the British Museum and is addressed by Adad-šuma-uṣur, king of Babylon, to two rulers, Aššur-nerari III and Ilī-padâ, who are addressed as the "kings of Assyria." The letter was copied and preserved in the Assyrian archives, possibly because of the enhanced status given to Ilī-padâ, the father of Ninurta-apal-Ekur, king of Assyria, c. 1192–1180 BC, whose descendants reigned on at least until the 8th century, and whose genealogical claim to the throne was tenuous and otherwise only based upon descent by a collateral line from Eriba-Adad I, c. 1393–1366 BC.

He was quite possibly violently swept aside by the ascendancy of IIlil-kudurrī-uṣur, another son of Tukulti-Ninurta I and probably his uncle. The life and career of his grand vizier, mentor and fellow "king" of Assyria, Ilī-padâ, seems to have ended at this point or shortly afterwards. The evidence from an archive which might shed light on the events of this period remains unavailable, leading the historian Itamar Singer to observe "regrettably, two important archives of the thirteenth century BC, each with some 400 tablets, still remain unpublished, ...(including) the Middle Assyrian texts from Tell Sabi Abyad (found in 1997–1998)."

== Inscriptions ==
Preceded by Ashur-nadin-apli	King of Assyria; 1202–1197 BC	Succeeded by Enlil-kudurri-usur
