= Migdal =

Migdal (Hebrew: מִגְדָּל, meaning "tower") is a Hebrew word for tower. It may refer to:

== People ==
- Migdal (surname)

== Places ==
- Kfar Etzion, formerly called Migdal Eder, an Israeli settlement in the West Bank
- Migdal Afek, national park near Rosh HaAyin, Israel
- Migdal HaEmek, city in Israel
- Migdal Oz, an Israeli settlement in the West Bank
- Migdal (the ancient Magdala, near Tiberias)
- Migdal, Israel, local council in Israel

== Buildings ==
- Migdal Synagogue, an ancient synagogue on the shore of the Sea of Galilee
- Shalom Meir Tower or Migdal Shalom Meir, an office tower in Tel Aviv, Israel
- Tower of Babel or Migdal Bavel
- Tower of David or Migdal David

== Companies and organizations ==
- Migdal Insurance and Financial Holdings, an Israeli finance and insurance holding company
  - Migdal Insurance Company, a wholly-owned subsidiary
- Migdal Or, an NGO
- Migdal Oz (seminary), an Israeli institution of Torah study for women, West Bank
- Zwi Migdal, a Polish Jewish organized crime group, based mainly in Argentina

== See also ==
- Hapoel Jerusalem B.C. or Hapoel Migdal Jerusalem, basketball club in Jerusalem
- Landau–Pomeranchuk–Migdal effect
- Majdal (disambiguation)
- Migdal Or (disambiguation)
- Migdol, a Hebrew word for tower
