= Bābu-aḫa-iddina =

Bābu-aḫa-iddina has been variously described as a chancellor, (Note: By Weidner and others quoting him.) sukkalmahhu, high-ranking official, and chief steward of the royal storehouse under three successive Assyrian kings, during the last five years of Adad-nārārī I (1305–1274 BC), the whole reign of Šulmanu-ašaredu I (1273–1244 BC) and the first five years of Tukulti-Ninurta I (1243–1207 BC).

== Biography ==
A son of Ibašši-ili and grandson of Nabu-le'i, he celebrated his eponym year towards the end of Adad-nārārī’s reign as attested in a single text relating the activities of Assur-kasid son of Sin-apla-eris at Billa. His sons, Putanu and Ina-pî-Aššur-lišlim, were to have their eponym years during the early to mid period of the reign of Šulmanu-ašaredu or perhaps early in that of Tukulti-Ninurta, in Ina-pî-Aššur-lišlim’s case. His female relatives included Marat-ili and Mushallimat-Ishtar. Perhaps the earliest appearance of his name comes tentatively restored on a tablet (Note: VAT 15420 line 19.) thought to be a copy of a treaty between Adad-nārārī and the Kassite king of Babylon, Kadašman-Turgu.

=== Archive 14410 ===
A cache of his correspondence, known as archive 14410, (Note: Pedersén’s archive M11.) consisting of 49 tablets and fragments covering the period 1253 to 1217 BC (Note: According to the chronological scheme which gives Tukulti-Ninurta's accession year as 1243 BC; if using 1233 BC, adjust by ten years.) was found in September 1908 during excavations in Aššur, the ancient capital of Assyria, in the archeological layer immediately above the east end of a tomb (14630), around fifty meters southwest of the west corner of the Nabû temple and twenty meters northeast of a monumental building associated by Weidner with Bābu-aḫa-iddina. It included records of international trade in raw materials, including ivory and a shipment of textiles to the Levant. 15 eponyms occur in this archive covering a period of over 35 years.

Amongst the letters are found a group of tablets, (Note: A. 307; A. 778; A. 1438 + 1559; A. 1514; A. 1577; A. 1587; A. 1598; A. 1720.) which he sent to the staff of his own household in Assur as he was presumably away on business. His correspondence with his subordinates includes instructions to protect wool and other textiles stored in sealed chests from the ravages of moths. His letter (Note: KAV 99, DeZ 3434+.) dated to the eponym of Ittabsiden-Assur, was one of two instructions addressed to the sa muhhi biti, or majordomo, Assur-zuquppanni, ordering him to air them. A third administrative text describes the outcome, the discovery of moth eaten (lapittu, "attacked") clothing, its separation and a fourth (Note: KAV 195 KAV 203.) assigned to this correspondence instructs them to have an artisan patch them.

The length of the archive is confirmed by a letter referring to an eponym Abi-ilu and a prince Tukulti-Ninurta. Assur-damiq, son of Abi-ilu, is referred to on an Assur stela. He was an eponym under Šulmanu-ašaredu. A letter (Note: Tablet VAT 18003, Ass. 16308 I, published as MARV 39, VS 19: no. 39.) to the governor of Amasaki, a city in Ḫābūr region, in the month of Kazullu, the eponym year of Ištar-eris, son of Sulmanu-qarrad, commands him to provide “income of the temple” in donkey loads of cereal, ”according to the small sutu-measure.” A tablet (Note: AfO 19 T7.1.) records garments manufactured over two preceding years, the eponym years of Ištar-eris and that of Assur-da’issunu, which "are given to Siqi-ilani for the caravan-trade to the country Kinahhi (Canaan)” in the eponym year of Usat-marduk.

=== Hittite correspondence ===
In Ḫattuša, near modern Boğazkale, drafts of letters (Note: Tablets Bo 2151, Bo 3089 and Bo 718, published as KUB 23:103.) have been found that may have been written by the Hittite king Ḫattušili III or possibly his son Tudhaliya IV to Bābu-aḫa-iddina. Written to mark the accession of Tukulti-Ninurta to the Assyrian throne, it includes a warning of the hazards of a projected Assyrian expedition into the land of Papanḫi, whose "mountains are impassable.” The Hittite king recommended, “Because his father died, and he has just seated himself upon the throne of his father, the campaign on which he goes for the first time should be one on which he enjoys a three- or fourfold numerical superiority.” This was exactly the same advice that Ḫattušili gave to the young Babylonian king, Kadašman-Enlil II, which was perhaps a ploy to embroil Babylon in a war with Assyria.

A still-sealed burial chamber, number 45, contained the richest of more than a thousand private middle Assyrian burials. It was associated with a large house uncovered during excavations in 1908 in Aššur and consisted of a shaft leading to an 8 foot by 5 foot chamber containing the remains of nine adults and a child. Most skeletal remains were heaped against a wall or in an urn, making space for the two most recent arrivals who were thought at the time to be a male and female by contemporary archeologists. The male may well have been Bābu-aḫa-iddina himself as his archive was found nearby. Unfortunately the bones were discarded after excavation preventing further analysis and doubts have subsequently been raised as to whether there was a male at all, based on the grave goods which included gold, lapis lazuli, carnelian and banded agate jewelry, elaborately carved ivory combs, pins and vessels and pottery articles comprising a pyxis with a lid and a cosmetic dish.
