= Enlil-kudurri-usur =

- King of Assyria

King of the Middle Assyrian Empire
- Reign: 5 regnal years 1196-1192 BC (high); 1186-1182 BC (low)
- Predecessor: Ashur-nirari III
- Successor: Ninurta-apal-Ekur
- Father: Tukulti-Ninurta I

Enlil-kudurrī-uṣur, ^{md}Enlil(be)-ku-dúr-uṣur, (Enlil protect the eldest son), was the 81st king of Assyria according to the Assyrian King List. (Note: Assyrian King List, iii 14.)

== Biography ==
Enlil-kudurri-usur was the son of Tukulti-Ninurta I. He succeeded his nephew, Ashur-nirari III’s brief reign and ruled for five years. Apart from king lists and chronicles, there are no other extant inscriptions of this king.

The Synchronistic King List (Note: Synchronistic King List, tablet excavation number Ass. 14616c (KAV 216), ii 6.) identifies his Babylonian contemporary with Adad-šuma-uṣur, his eventual nemesis. In the Synchronistic History, (Note: Synchronistic History, ii 3–8.) the battle between him and Adad-šuma-uṣur is given as a pretext for his Assyrian rival, Ninurta-apal-Ekur, a son of Ilī-padâ and descendant of Eriba-Adad I, to “come up from Karduniaš,” i.e. Babylonia, and make a play for the Assyrian throne. Grayson and others have speculated that this was with the tacit assistance of Adad-šuma-uṣur, but there is currently no published evidence to support this theory. Ninurta-apal-Ekur’s purpose for being in Babylonia is also unknown, whether a political refugee or an administrator of the Assyrian held portion. The Walker Chronicle (Note: Walker Chronicle, ABC 25, BM 27796, obverse lines 3 to 7.) describes how following his abject defeat at Adad-šuma-uṣur’s hands, Enlil-kudurrī-uṣur was seized by his own officers and handed over to his opponent. Only after these events did Adad-šuma-uṣur go on to extend his territory to include the city of Babylon itself.

Meanwhile, the Synchronistic History continues, Ninurta-apal-Ekur had “mustered his numerous troops and marched to conquer Libbi-ali (the city of Aššur). But [...] arrived unexpectedly, so he turned and went home.” As Grayson points out, this passage is open to various interpretations, only one of which is that the missing name could have been that of Enlil-kudurrī-uṣur, released by his captor to sow confusion amongst his northern foes.

== Inscriptions ==
Preceded by Ashur-nirari III	King of Assyria; 1196–1192 BC	Succeeded by Ninurta-apal-Ekur
