= Rabâ-ša-Marduk =

Rabâ-ša-Marduk, “great are (the deeds) of Marduk”, was a prominent physician, or asû, from the city of Nippur who was posted to the Hittite court of Muwatalli II (c. 1295–1272 BC short chronology) in Anatolia in the thirteenth century BC, apparently as part of a diplomatic mission of Kassite king Kadašman-Turgu (1281–1264 BC short chronology).

== Biography ==
His name was uncommon. Another Rabâ-ša-Marduk was governor of Isin but this was not until the reign of Nabu-apla-iddina, around four hundred years later.

Rabâ-ša-Marduk received twelve sūtu, where a sūtu is ca. 0.27 hectares, of high quality dates for his sacrifice, in the 11th year of Nazi-Maruttaš on the 19th day of the month of ulūlu (around August 1296 BC). Four years later, he again received a crop of dates for sacrificial services rendered. Then, in 1290 BC, he was supplied a mina of tallow for a journey to Babylon. There are a series of tablets recording rations for Rabâ-ša-Marduk excavated at Nippur of uncertain date but possibly up to Nazi-Maruttaš’ 21st year, including one provisioning another journey to Babylon.

A medical tablet originally from Babylon was found in excavations at Assur. It was probably one of the scientific and literary works looted by Tukulti-Ninurta I during his conquest of the city. It is accompanied by a colophon on lines 36 to 38, “Eighteen prescriptions for headache (lit: seizing of the temple), first tablet, from the hand of Rabiā-ša-Marduk.” Amongst the remedies it includes:

If a ghost seizes a man so that he continuously has a headache, you knead fox gr[ape…] with extract of kasû, [you bind it on and he will recover]. If ditto, [you take] old grease from the door of the city gate, [(the one which) stands] on your right when you are going out […] (that) night (and) that day, you twine (it) together with a cord. You wrap (the grease) in a tuft of wool an[d bind it on his temple].

— Rabâ-ša-Marduk, Tablet VAT 10267, obverse lines 23 to 26.

A later work, šumma amēlu muḫḫašu umma ukāl, a therapeutic exorcist work known primarily from the library of Ashurbanipal shares much of the content and may have borrowed from it.

His mission to the Hittite court must have taken place during the first half of Kadašman-Turgu’s reign as this was when there was an overlap with that of Muwatalli’s rule. He was accompanied by an incantation priest. His host, Muwatalli, was the only Hittite king known to have not fathered a son of the first rank (i.e. his primary wife, the Tawananna) and this may have been the reason behind the importation of foreign experts. If so, the effort was in vain as Muwatalli would be succeeded by Urḫi-Teššup, the son of a concubine, who reigned briefly under the name of Mursili III before his overthrow. Nevertheless, Rabâ-ša-Marduk was enticed to stay with the provision of a fine house and a marriage to a member of the king’s family. The Kassite king Kadašman-Enlil II (1263–1255 BC short chronology) would complain bitterly to Ḫattušili III about the failure to return loaned artisans, but Ḫattušili countered that the, now probably elderly, physician was free to go as he pleased.
