= Ilī-padâ =

Ilī-padâ or Ili-iḫaddâ, the reading of the name ^{(m)}DINGIR.PA.DA being uncertain, was a member of a side-branch of the Assyrian royal family who served as grand vizier, or sukkallu rabi’u, of Assyria, and also as king, or šar, of the dependent state of Ḫanigalbat around 1200 BC. He was a contemporary of the Assyrian king Aššur-nīrāri III, c. 1203–1198 BC (short chronology).

== Biography ==
His family traced their descent from Eriba-Adad I. His father was Aššur-iddin and grandfather Qibi-Aššur, both of whom had served as grand viziers and kings of Ḫanigalbat. He served his limmu year around the twenty fifth year of Tukulti-Ninurta I’s reign. His brothers were Qarrad-Aššur and Ninu'ayu, both of whom, like Ilī-padâ, served their limmu years during this period.

He seems to have fallen sick in his youth as a text found at Tell Šēḫ Ḥamad in eastern Syria close to the border with Iraq relates:

My lord wrote me on account of Ili-ipadda, your servant, as follows: "Is he a dead man?" The God of my lord seized his hand [saved him]. He has recovered well; he has gotten himself up and is into his house. He does not go outside the gate. Pus and...will come; above…. his pus; he gave; I will … for the second time.

— Unknown Official to Tukulti-Ninurta?, Tablet from Tell Šēḫ Ḥamad (ancient Dūr-katlimmu)

Together with Aššur-nīrāri III, he was the recipient of Kassite king Adad-šuma-uṣur’s derogatory letter, where he is addressed alongside his superior under a single title: [(x)] [x] LUGAL.MEŠ ša māt Aššur, the “x-x-kings of Assyria”. They are castigated for their lack of sense in most impolite terms, leading the letter to be interpreted as a sign of Babylonian ascendancy. Ilī-padâ had concluded a treaty with the Suteans, in which the Assyrian king was not mentioned.

Middle Assyrian texts from Tell Sabi Abyad shed further light on his career. The site is in the Balikh valley, in the very north of Syria close to the Turkish border and has been excavated in a series of digs since 1986 conducted under the auspices of Leiden University. He sent provisions to the king of Karkamiš, when the latter was under pressure from the Aramean tribesmen from Suhu. The dunnu, or fortified settlement at Tell Sabi-Abyad, served as Ilī-padâ’s, and before him, Aššur-idinna’s rural estate, while he was the Assyrian viceroy of Ḫanigalbat, as well as the dunnu being a regional administrative center. It was constructed during Tukulti-Ninurta‘s reign, remained a center for ceramic production until around 1185 BC when, during the reign of Enlil-kudurri-usur, Ilī-padâ died, and it was burnt down during that of Ninurta-apil-Ekur’s around 1180 BC.

Two of his sons were to follow him in attaining high office. Mardukija became governor of Katmuḫi, the mountainous region near modern Midyat in Turkish Kurdistan, and served his term as limmu early, during the reign of Aššur-dan I, his nephew and Ilī-padâ’s grandson. Ninurta-apal-Ekur, after a period stationed in Babylonia, presumably on official business, was to triumph in his campaign to succeed Enlil-kudurri-usur as Assyrian King, thereby establishing a royal line that endured until at least the eighth century. His inscriptions refer to him as a “son” of Eriba-Adad, rather than Ilī-padâ, as this was his last forefather who had been an Assyrian King, rather than an official. His daughter, Uballiṭittu, is mentioned in a tablet among a group of people as giving or receiving a box with three containers carrying five liters of high quality perfumed oils. She was possibly in a diplomatic marriage to the king of the land of Purulumzu.
