= Ashur-nadin-ahhe II =

King of Assyria
- Reign: c. 1401 – c. 1391 BC
- Predecessor: Ashur-rim-nisheshu
- Successor: Eriba-Adad I
- Died: c. 1391 BC
- Father: Ashur-rim-nisheshu

Ashur-nadin-ahhe II (Aššur-nādin-aḫḫē II; died c. 1391 BC) was king of Assyria from c. 1401 to 1391 BC.

== Reign ==
Preceded by Ashur-rim-nisheshu, he was succeeded by Eriba-Adad I.

Ashur-nadin-ahhe is an Assyrian personal name meaning “the god Ashur has given a brother” in Akkadian. Two Assyrian kings ruling in the 15th or early 14th century BC were called Ashur-nadin-ahhe. Hardly anything is known about these kings, but one of them is mentioned in one of the Amarna letters.

=== Amarna Archive ===
In the letter from king Ashur-uballit of Assyria to the Pharaoh of Egypt, numbered EA 16, Ashur-nadin-ahhe is referred to as his ancestor who wrote to Egypt and received gold in return. This would imply an earlier diplomatic marriage and alliance between Assyria and Egypt during his reign.^{[?]} The name Ashur-nadin-ahhe mentioned in EA 16 has recently been contested as a faulty writing of Ashur-nadin-apli, another Assyrian king.

== See also ==
- Kings of Assyria

Preceded by Ashur-rim-nisheshu	King of Assyria c. 1401 – c. 1391 BC	Succeeded by Eriba-Adad I
