= Ashur-bel-nisheshu =

Ashur-bel-nisheshu 𒁹𒀭𒀸𒋩𒂗𒌦𒈨𒌍𒋙

King of Assyria
- Reign: c. 1418 – c. 1409 BC
- Predecessor: Ashur-nirari II
- Successor: Ashur-rim-nisheshu
- Died: c. 1409 BC
- Father: Ashur-nirari II

Aššūr-bēl-nīšēšu, (Middle Assyrian Akkadian: 𒁹𒀭𒀸𒋩𒂗𒌦𒈨𒌍𒋙, romanized: ᵐᵈaš-šur-EN-UN.MEŠ-šú, (Note: Nassouhi King List, Istanbul A. 116 (Assur 8836), iii 11–12.) (Note: Khorsabad King List, IM 60017 (excavation nos.: DS 828, DS 32-54), iii 5–6.) (Note: SDAS King List, tablet IM 60484, ii 38.)) and meaning “(the god) Aššur (is) lord of his people,” (died c. 1409 BC) was the ruler of Assyria c. 1417–1409 BC or 1407–1398 BC (short chronology), the variants due to uncertainties in the later chronology. He succeeded his father, Ashur-nirari II, to the throne and is best known for his treaty with Kassite king Karaindash.

== Biography ==
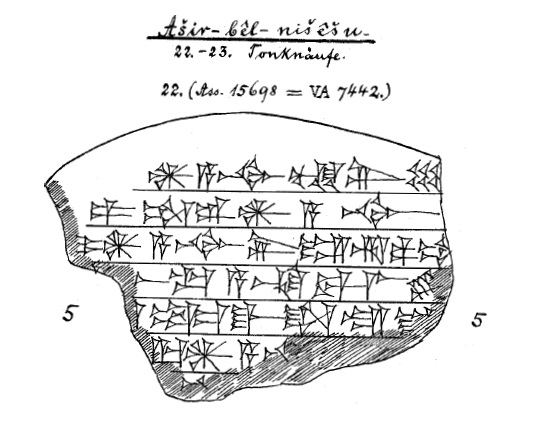
Schroeder's line art for one of Ashur-bel-nisheshu’s memorial cones (Note: Cone VAT 7442, first published KAH 2 no. 22 (1922).)

As was the practice during this period of the Assyrian monarchy, he modestly titled himself “vice-regent”, or išši'ak Aššur, of the god Ashur. The Synchronistic Chronicle (Note: Synchronistic Chronicle (ABC 21), tablet K4401a, i 1–4.) records his apparently amicable territorial treaty with Karaindaš, king of Babylon, and recounts that they “took an oath together concerning this very boundary.”. This treaty, made independently, indicates Mitanni influence over Assyria was waning. His numerous clay cone inscriptions (line art for an example pictured) celebrate his re-facing of Puzur-Ashur III’s wall of the “New City” district of Assur.

Contemporary legal documents detail sales of land, houses, and slaves and payment in lead. The Assyrian credit system was fairly sophisticated, with loans issued for commodities such as barley and lead, interest coming due when repayment was delayed. The security posted for loans could include property, the person of the debtor or indeed his children.

There is a discrepancy in the data about his son and eventual successor. The Assyrian King List gives his immediate successor, Ashur-rim-nisheshu, as his son, but Ashur-rim-nisheshu's own contemporary inscription (Note: Cone VAT^{?} 2764, first published KAH 1 no. 63 (1911).) names his father as Ashur-nirari II, suggesting that he may have been a brother of Ashur-bel-nisheshu. The confusion is further compounded with the Khorsabad Kinglist and the SDAS Kinglist identifying Eriba-Adad I, who ascended the throne around 18 years later, as his son while the Nassouhi copy identifies him as the son of Ashur-rim-nisheshu.

== Inscriptions ==
Preceded by Ashur-nirari II	King of Assyria c. 1418 – c. 1409 BC	Succeeded by Ashur-rim-nisheshu
