= King of All Peoples =

Title held by Mesopotamian monarchs

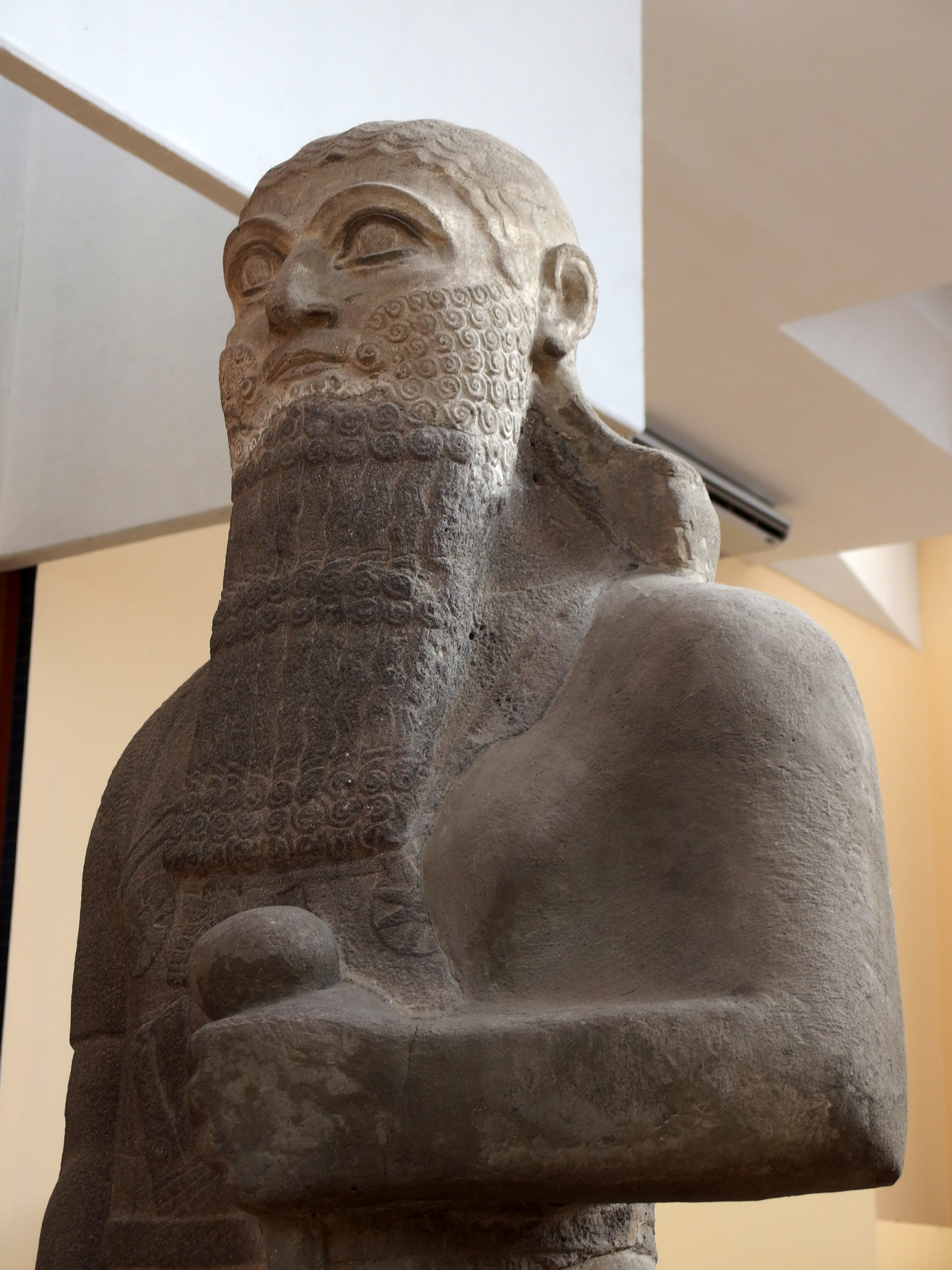
The title of King of All Peoples was frequently used by the Neo-Assyrian king Shalmaneser III.

King of All Peoples (Akkadian: šar kiššat nišē) was a rarely attested title of great prestige claimed by some of the kings of Assyria. It was one of several ancient Mesopotamian titles explicitly claiming world domination, the others being šar kibrāt erbetti (King of the Four Corners of the World) and šar kiššatim (King of the Universe). Unlike these other two titles, which had their origins during the Akkadian Empire ~2300 BC and had endured widespread recognition and usage throughout more than a thousand years of Mesopotamian history, the title of šar kiššat nišē appears to have been a later Assyrian invention only used by a handful of kings.

Unlike the other titles of supposed world domination, "king of all peoples" does not refer to a territorial domain, but rather that the Assyrian king was superior to foreign people and that he possessed a legitimate right to govern (all of) them. It appears in the titularies of the Middle-Assyrian kings Shalmaneser I and Tukulti-Ninurta I.

Šar kiššat nišē was one of several titles used by the Neo-Assyrian king Ashurnasirpal II, other similar titles and epithets used by him include šapir kal nišē ("commander of all peoples") and ša naphar kiššat nišē ipellu ("he who rules all people"). To enforce his right to rule over all peoples, Ashurnasirpal made sure that his new capital of Kalhu had a very distinct multi-ethnic character as the result of moving people from throughout his empire to its location. The title of šar kiššat nišē was also a frequently used and important title of Ashurnasirpal's successor Shalmaneser III.

== List of known Kings of All Peoples ==
- Shalmaneser I (r. 1263–1234 BC)
- Tukulti-Ninurta I (r. 1233–1208 BC)
- Ashurnasirpal II (r. 883–859 BC)
- Shalmaneser III (r. 859–824 BC)
