= Amarna letter EA 16 =

Amarna Letter EA 16 is part of the corpus of the Amarna Letters, a set of letters written mostly in Akkadian found at the Egyptian capital of Tell El-Amarna. The text records a correspondence from Ashur-uballit I, Founder of the Middle Assyrian Empire, to an uncertain ruler of Ancient Egypt. The name of the Pharaoh is partially broken off with most scholars favoring a reading that matches the praenomen of Akhenaten but it is also possibly the praenomen of Ay (pharaoh).

== Contents ==
The contents of the letter detail a gift exchange between the kings with Ashur-uballit sending two chariots, two horses, and a ring of Lapis lazuli. The Assyrian King asks in return for gold to adorn his palace which he claims "in your country is dirt". He further cites supposed previous gifts of 20 talents of gold to Ashur-nadin-ahhe II and the King of Hanigalbat. The Assyrian King also provides news of Egyptian messengers that were harassed by Suteans on their journey between the kingdoms and exhorts the Pharaoh to not let his messagers die of Sun exposure unless there is profit involved "[o]r otherwise, why should they die in the sun?"
