= Ashur-rim-nisheshu =

King of Assyria
- Reign: c. 1409 – c. 1401 BC
- Predecessor: Ashur-bel-nisheshu
- Successor: Ashur-nadin-ahhe II
- Died: c. 1401 BC
- Issue: Ashur-nadin-ahhe II

Aššur-rā’im-nišēšu, inscribed ^{md}aš-šur-ÁG-UN.MEŠ-šu, meaning “(the god) Aššur loves his people,” (died c. 1401 BC) was a ruler of Assyria, or išši’ak Aššur, “vice-regent of Aššur,” written in Sumerian: PA.TE.SI (=ÉNSI), c. 1408–1401 BC or c. 1398–1391 BC (short chronology), the 70th to be listed on the Assyrian King List. He is best known for his reconstruction of the inner city wall of Assur.

== Biography ==
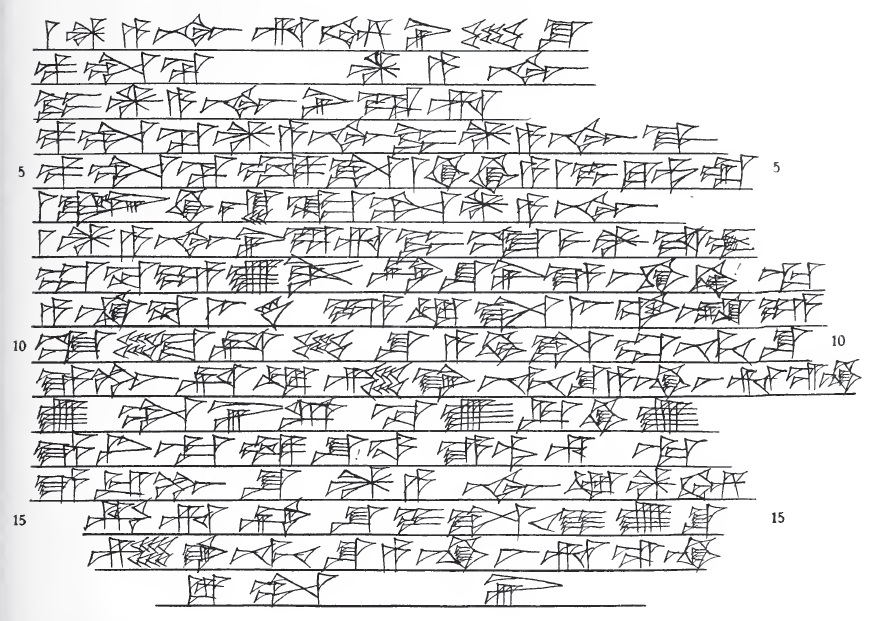
Messerschmidt’s line art for Ashur-rim-nisheshu’s memorial cone (Note: Cone VAT^{?} 2764, first published KAH 1 no. 63 (1911).)

All three extant Assyrian Kinglists (Note: Khorsabad Kinglist iii 7.) (Note: SDAS Kinglist iii 1.) (Note: Nassouhi Kinglist iii 11.) give his filiation as “son of Ashur-bel-nisheshu," the monarch who immediately preceded him, but this is contradicted by the sole extant contemporary inscription, a cone giving a dedicatory inscription for the reconstruction of the wall of the inner city of Assur, which gives his father as Ashur-nirari II (written phonetically on the third line of the illustration), the same as his predecessor who was presumably therefore his brother. With Ber-nādin-aḫḫe, another son of Aššur-nērārī who was given the title "supreme judge," it seems he may have been the third of Aššur-nērārī's sons to rule.

The cone identifies the previous restorers as Kikkia, Ikunum, Sargon I, Puzur-Ashur II, and Ashur-nirari I, the son of Ishme-Dagan II. The reference to Kikkia's original fortification of the city is repeated in one of the later king's, Shalmaneser III, own inscriptions. It was recovered from an old adobe wall three meters from the northern edge of the ziggurat.

He was succeeded by his son Ashur-nadin-ahhe II.

== Inscriptions ==
Preceded by Ashur-bel-nisheshu	King of Assyria c. 1409 – c. 1401 BC	Succeeded by Ashur-nadin-ahhe II
