= Kadashman-Enlil II =

Kadašman-Enlil II
- King of Babylon
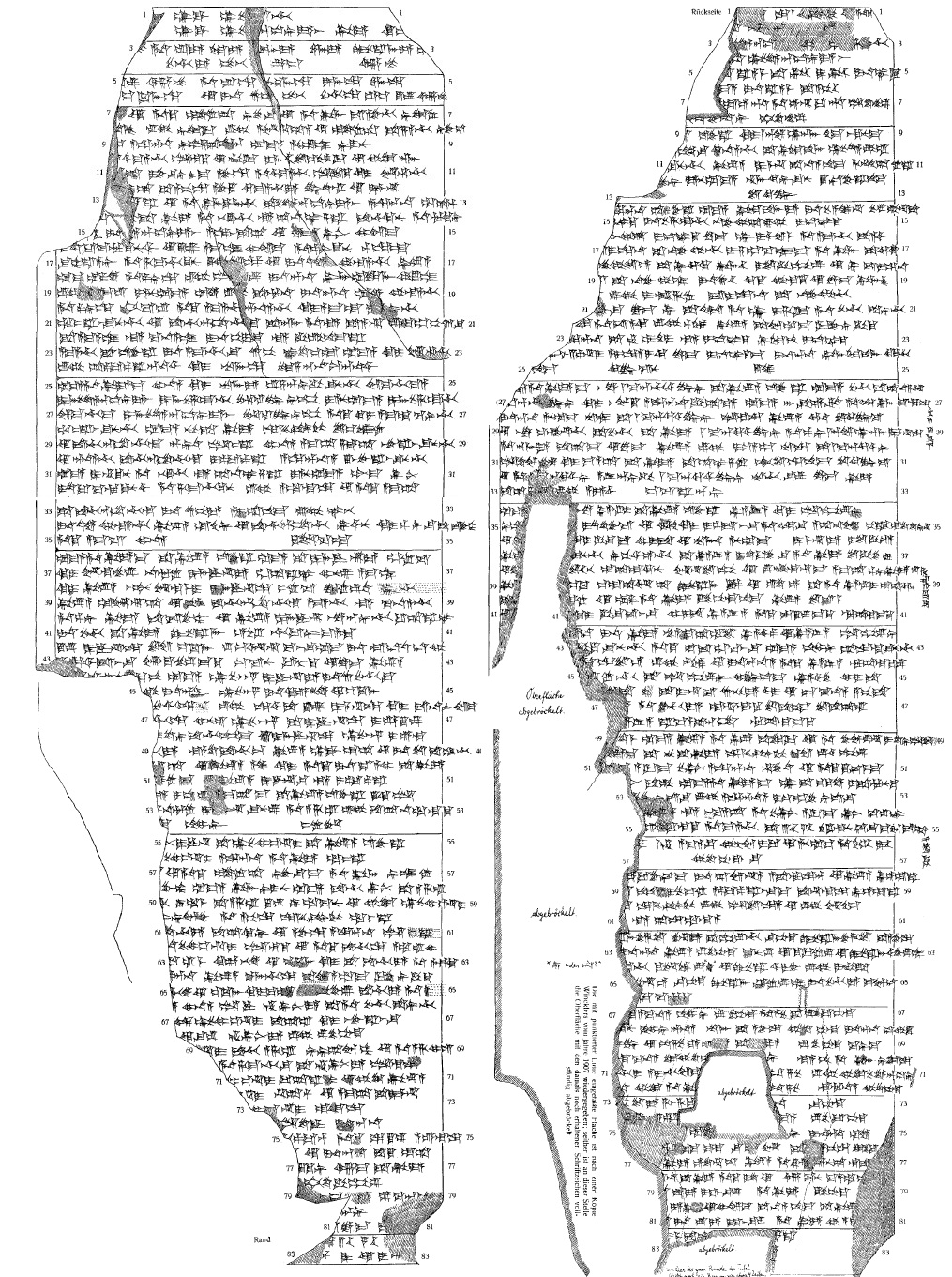
- KBo I 10 original publication of letter from Ḫattušili III to Kadašman-Enlil II. (Note: Letter from Ḫattušili III to Kadašman-Enlil II, Bo 1802, published as KBo 1:10 and KUB 3.72 (another fragment).)
- Reign: 9 regnal years c. 1263–1255 BC
- Predecessor: Kadašman-Turgu
- Successor: Kudur-Enlil
- House: Kassite

Kadašman-Enlil II, typically rendered ^{d}ka-dáš-man-^{d}EN.LÍL (Note: The replacement of the masculine determinative ^{m} by the divine one ^{d} is a distinction of Kassite monarchs after Nazi-Maruttaš.) in contemporary inscriptions, meaning “he believes in Enlil” (c. 1263-1255 BC) was the 25th king (Note: Kinglist A, BM 33332, ii 4, for position although the name is mostly broken away.) of the Kassite or 3rd dynasty of Babylon.

== Reign ==
=== Regency ===
Kadashman-Enlil II ascended the throne as a child. Consequently, the political power was held by the influential vizier Itti-Marduk-balatu.

During this regency, Hattusili III of Hatti had to deal with the vizier who proved negative of the Hittites, noting: “whom the gods have caused to live far too long and [from] whose mouth unfavourable words never cease”, according to Ḫattušili III. The vizier seems to have adopted a sharply antagonistic position towards the Hittites, favoring the appeasement of their belligerent Assyrian northerly neighbor.

=== Correspondence with Ḫattušili III ===
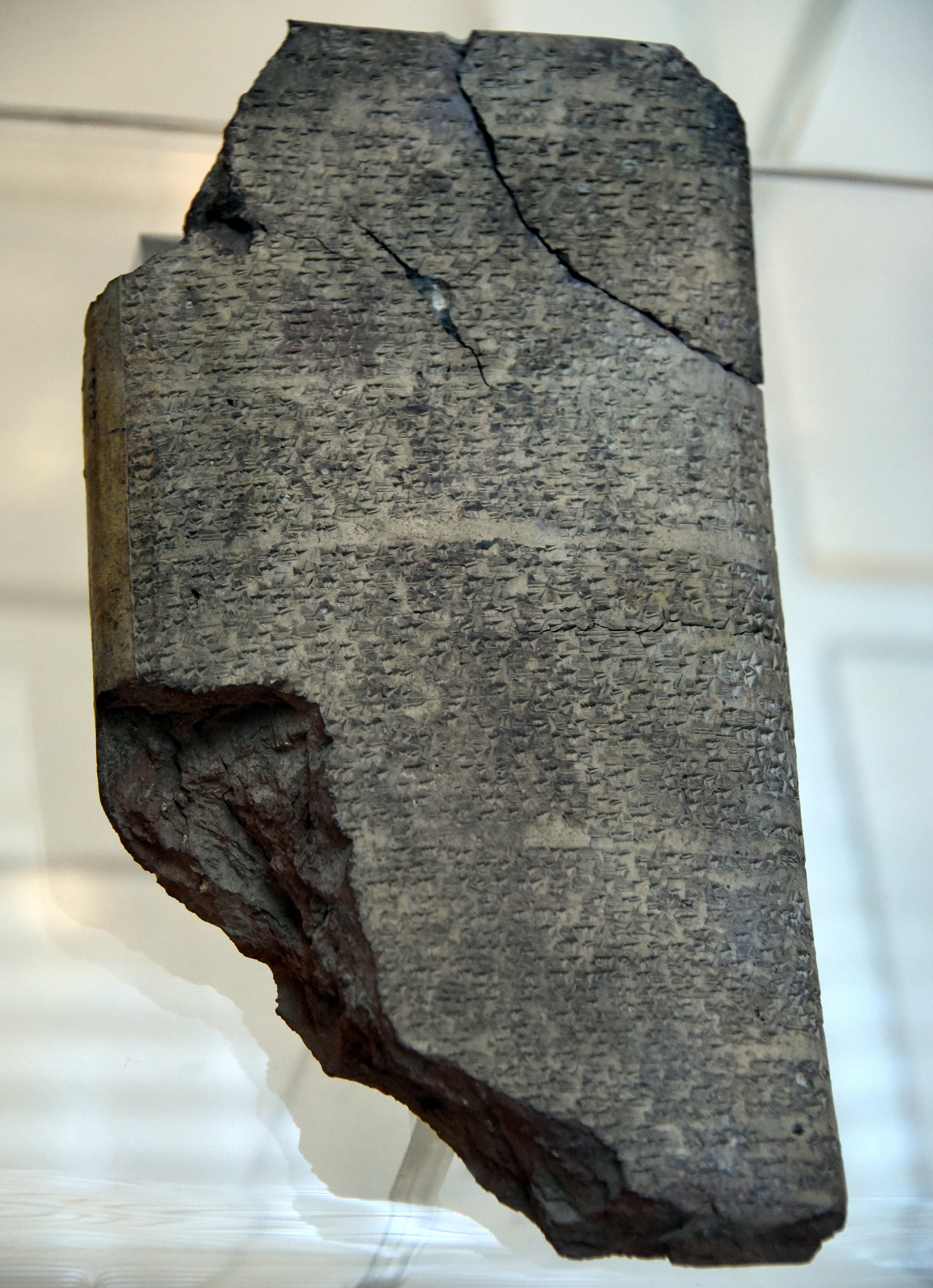
A letter from Hattusili III to Kadasman-Enlil II, 13th century BC, from Hattusa, Istanbul Archaeological Museum

In the first place the Hittite king, Ḫattušili III, wrote to Itti-Marduk-balatu (“With-Marduk-[there is]-Life”) to reestablish relations with Kadašman-Turgu's successor, because “my brother (Kadašman-Enlil) was a child in those days, and they did not read out the tablets in your presence.” Itti-Marduk-balatu seems to have adopted the part of viceroy and, on one hand, Ḫattušili tried to renew the alliance entered into by the late king and, on the other, warn him – “If you do not protect my brother’s progeny in the kingship, I shall become your enemy.” This drew an angry response from the vizier, who accused Ḫattušili of treating them like vassals.

Kadašman-Enlil had allowed his diplomatic missions with the Hittite court to lapse, prompting an anxious Ḫattušili to ask why. “Since the Ahlamu are hostile I have stopped sending my messengers. The King of Assyria prevents my messenger from crossing his territory” – were his feeble responses, and this drew the curt reply: “Only when two kings are at enmity do their messengers cease regular travel between them”. However, when Kadašman-Enlil complained to Ḫattušili that his traders were being killed in Amurru and Ugarit, he refuted that any such thing could happen in Hittite territory. Kadašman Enlil's envoy, Adad-šar-ilani, had witnessed Bentešina of Amurru's sworn rebuttal that he had cursed Babylonia, helping to diffuse an international crisis.

Complimenting him on his hunting prowess, Ḫattušili observed, “I have heard that my brother has become a grown man and regularly goes out to hunt,” before goading him to make war on a weaker neighbor, presumably Assyria. “Do not keep sitting around, my brother, but go against an enemy land and defeat the enemy! [Against which land] should [my brother] go out? Go against a land over which you enjoy three – or fourfold numerical superiority.” The exact same advice was given to Bābu-aḫa-iddina, an important Assyrian official, for a young Tukulti-Ninurta I on his accession to the throne of Assyria, very possibly by Ḫattušili or his son Tudhaliya IV. A diplomatic marriage may have been in the offing with Ḫattušili's wife Puduhepa matchmaking Kadašman Enlil's betrothal to one of her daughters, if the assignment of the recipients and sequence of related letters is correct, but alas it was not to come to pass as he died young. (Note: Tablets KUB 21:38 to Kudur-Enlil and KUB 26.88 to Kadašman-Enlil or Kadašman-Turgu.)

=== Diplomacy with Egypt ===
Relations with Egypt were restored and possibly cemented with a diplomatic marriage of a “daughter of Babylon who had been given to Egypt”, who must surely have been Kadašman-Enlil's sister.

=== More horses than straw ===
In his correspondence with Kadašman-Enlil, Ḫattušili had observed that “in my brother’s country, the horses are more plentiful than straw,” echoing the earlier sentiment of a letter from the Amarna corpus that stated, ‘’gold is like dust in the land of my brother,” rejoined by ‘’there are more horses than straw in the land of my Kassite brother.”

However, Babylon was the source of more than equine commodities. It also provided high-in-demand physicians and other skilled artisans, such as sculptors, conjurers, and incantation priests. Kadašman-Enlil had complained about the failure to return loaned doctors. Ḫattušili had concurred: "Detaining a doctor is not right!" But one named Rabâ-ša-Marduk had been enticed to stay, with provision of a “fine house” and a royal marriage. Another had the misfortune to have died, which failed to shame the unabashed Ḫattušili from requesting the services of a sculptor.

Kadashman-Enlil II's reign was fairly short, up to nine years attested on the date formulae of more than forty economic texts. Inscribed bricks of Kadashman-Enlil II were found in a Kassite temple at Larsa.
