= Migdal (surname) =

Migdal is a Jewish surname. It originates from the Greek word amygdalia meaning almond and may refer to the following notable people:

- Alexander Migdal (born 1945), Soviet, Russian and American physicist, son of Arkady Migdal
- Arkady Migdal (1911–1991), Soviet physicist
- Joel S. Migdal, American political scientist
- Ted Migdal (1918–1999), American professional basketball player
