= Migdal Insurance and Financial Holdings =

Israeli insurance company

Migdal Insurance and Financial Holdings Ltd
- Native name: מגדל אחזקות ביטוח ופיננסים בע"מ
- Company type: Holding company
- Traded as: MGDL
- Industry: Insurance; Financial services
- Founded: 1974; 52 years ago
- Headquarters: Petah Tikva, Israel
- Key people: Shlomo Eliahu (owner)
- Products: Life insurance; Provident Funds
- Subsidiaries: Migdal Insurance Company
- Website: www.migdalholdings.co.il

Migdal Insurance and Financial Holdings Ltd. (Hebrew: מגדל אחזקות ביטוח ופיננסים בע"מ) (TASE: MGDL) is an Israeli public holding company that owns a number of companies operating in the insurance and financial services sectors, primarily the Migdal Insurance Company. The company was founded in August 1974. Since 1997, the company's shares have been traded on the Tel Aviv Stock Exchange and are included in the TA-125 Index.

== History ==
In September 1996, Migdal made its initial public offering on the Tel Aviv Stock Exchange, selling 20% shares stake.

The main subsidiary of Migdal Insurance and Financial Holdings is Migdal Insurance Company (known by its abbreviated name Migdal, above), which deals in a variety of types of insurance: life insurance, property insurance, health insurance, and more. Other prominent subsidiaries, held by Migdal Holdings since 2001, are the investment house Migdal Capital Markets Ltd. and "Migdal Health and Quality of Life Ltd." The subsidiaries hold many subsidiaries of their own.

In March 2012, Assicurazioni Generali agreed to sell all of its holdings in Migdal Insurance and Finance Holdings Ltd. to Shlomo Eliahu, and this agreement was completed in October 2012. The shareholders of Migdal Insurance and Finance Holdings, as of November 2012, are Shlomo Eliyahu (approximately 70%), Bank Leumi (approximately 10%) and the public, which holds approximately 20% of the shares.

Shlomo Eliahu served as Chairman of the Board of Directors until January 2022, when he was replaced by Hanan Melcer. In November 2024, Roni Gamzo was appointed Chairman of the Board of Directors. The CEO of the company, until the end of December 2021, was Yiftach Ron-Tal. His successor from July 2022 is Yossi Ben Baruch.

Migdal was founded in Jerusalem in 1934. The original group of investors included local Palestinian Jews, families from Egypt and Italy and the Italian insurance company Assicurazioni Generali which held a 50% stake and provided the original financial and professional backing.

Generali eventually held 70% of Migdal's shares, and Bank Leumi owns almost 10%.

== See also ==
- Economy of Israel
