= Migdal Insurance Company =

Israeli insurance company

Migdal Insurance Company Ltd
- Native name: מגדל חברה לביטוח בע"מ
- Company type: Subsidiary
- Industry: Insurance; Financial services
- Founded: 1934; 92 years ago
- Headquarters: Petah Tikva, Israel
- Key people: Shlomo Eliahu (owner)
- Products: Life insurance; Provident Funds
- Parent: Migdal Insurance and Financial Holdings
- Website: www.migdal.co.il

Migdal Insurance Company Ltd. (Hebrew: מגדל חברה לביטוח בע"מ) is an Israeli insurance company established in 1934 and deals in a variety of types of insurance, including life insurance, property insurance and health insurance. The company is fully owned by Migdal Insurance and Financial Holdings.

== History ==
The Migdal Insurance Company was founded in 1934 in Jerusalem by Jewish business families from Alexandria, most notably businessman Edward Agyeon, Etienne Bech, and the Italian insurance company Assicurazioni Generali. The company's name was given to it by the poet Hayim Nahman Bialik, as an expression of the resilience and security that the company seeks to provide to its customers. In the 1940s, the company's shareholders also included Anglo-Palestine Bank, which later became Bank Leumi. Poet Shaul Tchernichovsky served as the company's first physician.

The "Migdal" fire insurance mark are among the most common of the 55 types of fire signs identified in Israel from the Mandatory period.

Migdal was the first company to launch executive insurance in Israel, and the first to establish a non-regulated pension fund.

In the 2000s, "Migdal Insurance" is owned by the public company "Migdal Insurance Holdings and Finance Ltd.", controlled by businessman Shlomo Eliyahu.

In 2000, Migdal acquired two insurance agencies, "Simon & Wiesel" and "Mivtach Shamir", and merged them into one company - Mivtach Simon In 2002, Migdal acquired the Teutsa Pension Fund and merged it with the Tnufa Pension Fund, which it owned. In this way, it became the owner of the largest private pension fund in Israel at the time. In 2004, Migdal acquired the New Makefet Pension Fund. In 2006, all of the Migdal Group's pension funds were merged into one fund. The Makefet Personal, Teutsa, Yozma Hadasha and Tnufa pension funds were merged into the Makefet Pension Fund.

In December 2018, the company's chairman, Oded Sarig, resigned from his position. In his resignation letter, he wrote that "due to the corporate governance practiced by the company, it acts according to short-term considerations, without a defined plan".

In November 2019, the company announced the cessation of marketing of private long-term care insurance.

In January 2021, Migdal had approximately 2.3 million insured persons (individual and business) and approximately 2,800 agents and arrangement managers. The company manages approximately 33% of life insurance and new pension funds in Israel, in terms of premiums and benefits.
