= Ninurta-apal-Ekur =

- King of Assyria

King of the Middle Assyrian Empire
- Reign: 3 or 13 regnal years 1191–1179 BC
- Predecessor: Enlil-kudurri-usur
- Successor: Ashur-dan I
- Father: Ilī-padâ

Ninurta-apal-Ekur, inscribed ^{md}MAŠ-A-é-kur, meaning "Ninurta is the heir of the Ekur," was a king of Assyria in the early 12th century BC who usurped the throne and styled himself king of the universe and priest of the gods Enlil and Ninurta. His reign overlaps the reigns of his Babylonian contemporaries Adad-šuma-uṣur and Meli-Šipak.

== Biography ==
There is some dispute as to how long he reigned, based on discrepancies among various copies of the Assyrian King List. The Nassouhi King List, sometimes considered to be older than the other versions of the King List we have, gives him 13 years of reign, but the other king lists give him only three. More recent scholarship has tended to support the longer reign, in which case he reigned from 1192 to 1180 BC (alternately, he reigned from 1182 to 1180 BC).

There are up to eleven possible limmu officials named for his regnal years and a recent publication proposes the following sequence:

- Salmanu-zera-iqiša
- Liptanu
- Salmanu-šumu-lešir
- Erib-Aššur
- Marduk-aḫa-eriš
- Pišqiya
- Aššur-dan I
- Atamar-den-Aššur
- Aššur-bel-lite
- Adad-mušabši

As the seventh in the sequence is Ninurta-apal-Ekur's son and successor, Aššur-dan I, and the king was thought to occupy the limmu position in the first year of his ascendancy, it is suggested that the succession took place here.

=== Provenance ===
His father was Ilī-padâ, who had followed his father, Aššur-iddin, and grandfather, Qibi-Aššur, as grand vizier, or sukkallu rabi’u, of Assyria and king of the dependant state of Ḫanigalbat. Qibi-Aššur may be one of three officials who are attested as limmu’s, the sons of Šamaš-aḫa-iddina, Ṣilli-Marduk, Ibašši-ili, respectively and it is this latter one, whose limmu year directly follows that of Tukulti-Ninurta I, that has led some to speculate that Ninurta-apal-Ekur was a descendant of Adad-nirari I, a genealogy that is unlikely as he claims descent only from Eriba-Adad I in his inscriptions. The earlier two have their limmu years during the reign of Shalmaneser I which better fits the chronology.

=== Ascendancy ===
The preceding Assyrian king, Enlil-kudurri-usur, a son of the earlier king Tukulti-Ninurta I, was vanquished in battle against the Kassite monarch, Adad-šuma-uṣur, a defeat so ignoble that the Assyrian officers "seized [Enlil-kudurri-uṣur] their lord and gave (him) to Adad-šuma-uṣur." Perhaps to secure their passage, the Assyrians also handed over renegade Babylonians who had fled to the Assyrian side.

While these events were unfolding, “Ninurta-apal-Ekur went home. He mustered his numerous troops and marched to conquer Libbi-ali (the city of Aššur)." The Kings List tells us that he "came up from Karduniaš, seized the throne," although it can only be speculated what he was doing in Karduniaš (Babylonia). The Synchronistic Chronicle continues "But [...] arrived unexpectedly, so he turned and went home" which suggests that the succession was not smooth.

Ninurta-apal-Ekur is said to have "guarded all the people of Assyria, with wings like an eagle spread out over his country." He was the recipient of gifts from Meli-Šipak, who sent teams of horses and rugs, as a recently discovered text records, unearthed during excavations at Assur.

=== Palace decrees ===
He issued one of the nine palace decrees (riksu) relating to conduct of the court and the oppressive discipline of the royal harem (known as harem edicts or Middle Assyrian palace decrees), suggestive of insecurity in the succession, although he need not have worried as his descendants would continue to rule Assyria until at least the eighth century BC. The first relates to the conduct of a eunuch approaching the harem and that of the concubines. The second threatens the harem women with having their throats cut, if when quarreling they should blaspheme against a god. The third punished men guilty of lèse majesté and the remaining are too fragmentary to be certain of their contents, but regulate curses against, for example, the royal furniture, i.e. bed and stool. Minor infractions were dealt with severely, with the guilty woman having her nose pierced and being beaten with rods.

A text records his gift of jewellery to his daughter Muballitaṭ[...], the great high priestess.

| Preceded by Enlil-kudurri-usur | King of Assyria; 1191–1179 BC | Succeeded by Ashur-dan I |
