= Ashur-nirari II =

King of Assyria
- Reign: c. 1425 – c. 1418 BC
- Predecessor: Enlil-Nasir II
- Successor: Ashur-bel-nisheshu
- Died: c. 1418 BC
- Issue: Ashur-bel-nisheshu
- Father: Enlil-nasir II

Aššur-nērārī II, inscribed ^{m}aš-šur-ERIM.GABA (=DÁḪ), "(the god) Aššur is my help," (died c. 1418 BC) was the king of Assyria, the 68th to appear on the Assyrian Kinglist, c. 1424–1418 BC or 1414–1408 BC depending on a later uncertainty in the chronology, at the tail end of the Old Assyrian period. Assyria was to a degree under the domination of Mitanni at this time and still recovering from their sacking of the city under Shaushtatar.

== Biography ==
He was the son of Enlil-Nasir II, who had preceded him on the Assyrian throne. According to the Khorsabad Kinglist (Note: Khorsabad Kinglist, tablet IM 60017 (excavation nos.: DS 828, DS 32-54), iii 3.) he reigned for seven years, the corresponding columns on the Nassouhi and SDAS Kinglists are damaged at this point. A legal text (Note: KAJ 174.) from Aššur is dated to the “Eponym of Ber-nādin-aḫḫe, son of Aššur-nērārī, supreme judge” and another (Note: KAJ 8.) gives the witness “Šamaš-kidinnu, son of Ibaši-ilu, son of Ber-nādin-aḫḫe, supreme judge.” The title and genealogy suggest Ber-nādin-aḫḫe may have been an otherwise unattested successor to Aššur-nērārī.

He was succeeded by his son Ashur-bel-nisheshu.

== Inscriptions ==
Preceded by Enlil-Nasir II	King of Assyria c. 1425 – c. 1418 BC	Succeeded by Ashur-bel-nisheshu
