= Ashur-nadin-apli =

- King of Assyria

King of the Middle Assyrian Empire
- Reign: 4 regnal years 1206–1203 BC (high); 1196-1193 BC (low)
- Predecessor: Tukulti-Ninurta I
- Successor: Ashur-nirari III
- Issue: Ashur-nirari III
- Father: Tukulti-Ninurta I

Aššūr-nādin-apli, inscribed ^{m}aš-šur-SUM-DUMU.UŠ, was a king of Assyria, reigning in 1206 BC–1203 BC or 1196 BC–1193 BC (short chronology). The alternate dating is due to uncertainty over the length of reign of a later monarch, Ninurta-apal-Ekur, where conflicting king lists differ by ten years. His name meant "Aššur is the giver of an heir" in the Akkadian language. He was a son of Tukulti-Ninurta I. (Note: All three copies of the Assyrian King List agree on his paternal relation.)

== Biography ==
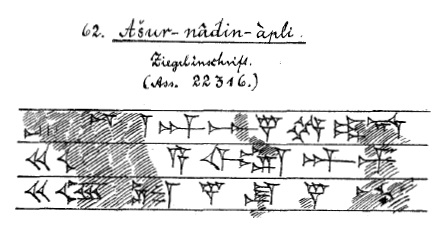
Schroeder's line art for Aššūr-nādin-apli's brick inscription. (Note: Brick inscription Ass. 22346, KAH 2 62.)

The events surrounding the overthrow of Tukulti-Ninurta remain somewhat shrouded in mystery. His military conquests seem to have taken place during the first half of his reign with modern scholarship suggesting that his climactic victory against Kaštiliašu IV and the city of Babylon occurred during two campaigns during his thirteenth and fifteenth years, if the placing of the eponyms, the Assyrian dating system, of Etel-pi-Aššur and Aššur-bel-ilani are correct. The latter part of his reign was characterized by reversal as the over-extended Assyrian military struggled to hold on to the earlier prizes and this may well have been the reason for his toppling.

Copies of the Assyrian King List record that "Aššūr-nādin or nāṣir-apli, (Note: The Nassouhi King List (NaKL) and the Khorsabad King List (KhKL) say Aššūr-nādin-apli but the Seventh Day Adventist Seminary King List (SDAS) says Aššūr-nāṣir-apli.) his son, seized the throne (for himself and) ruled for three or four (Note: The NaKL says three years, while the KhKL and the SDAS say four years.) years." Brinkman relates that "it is uncertain whether one or two princes lie behind the conflicting scribal traditions," but Grayson is more emphatic, "there seem to have been at least two sons." Yamada, however, argues that it was scribal confusion with the later succession of Tukulti-Ninurta II by Aššūr-nāṣir-apli II. The names differ by just one cuneiform character, PAB for nāṣir and SUM for nādin. The Babylonian Chronicle P recalls "Aššur-nāṣir-apli, his son (mar-šu) and the officers of Assyria rebelled, removed him from his throne, shut him up in a room and killed him." (Note: Chronicle P, column 4, lines 10 to 11.)

It was Aššūr-nādin-apli who succeeded to the throne, as testified by the scanty inscriptions left behind, which include bricks from Assur (line art pictured), "(Property of) the palace of Aššūr-nādin-apli …" and a lengthy text on a stone tablet commemorating rerouting the Tigris to the north of the city by "divine means" to recover agricultural fields and the erection of a shrine. This breaks with Assyrian tradition, extending the list of royal epithets to include "faithful shepherd, to whom by the command of the gods Aššur, Enlil and Šamaš the just sceptre was given and whose important name was called for the return (or care) of the land, the king under the protective hand of the god An and select of the god Enlil…" by which we may infer he was seeking divine support for his tenuous throne.

Just one eponym has been positively identified for his rule, that of Erīb-Sîn, which dates the stone tablet. A tablet also dated to this year was found at Tell Taban, site of the vassal state of Tâbatu near modern Al-Hasakah during salvage excavation under the direction of Hirotoshi Numoto in advance of the building of a dam in northeastern Syria. The king of Tâbatu was an Assyrian official named Adad-bēl-gabbe whose rule spanned that of four Assyrian monarchs seemingly unaffected by the turmoil at the heart of the empire.

He was succeeded by Aššur-nerari III, who was either his son or his nephew, again depending on the existence of Aššūr-naṣir-apli.

== Inscriptions ==
Preceded by Tukulti-Ninurta I	King of Assyria; 1206–1203 BC	Succeeded by Ashur-nirari III
