= Eriba-Adad I =

King of Assyria
- Reign: c. 1391 – c. 1364 BC
- Predecessor: Ashur-nadin-ahhe II
- Successor: Ashur-uballit I
- Died: c. 1364 BC
- Issue: Ashur-uballit I

Eriba-Adad, inscribed ^{m}SU-^{d}IM or ^{m}SU-^{d}10 ("[the god] Adad has replaced"; died c. 1364 BC), was king of Assyria from c. 1391 BC to 1364 BC. His father was probably the earlier king Ashur-bel-nisheshu, an affiliation attested in brick inscriptions, (Note: Bricks Ass. 16315 and Ass. 17991.) king-lists (Note: Khorsabad king list, IM 60017 (excavation nos.: DS 828, DS 32-54).) (Note: SDAS King list, IM 60484,) and a tablet (Note: Tablet VAT 9836, copy of a cone inscription commemorating building work.) although a single king list (Note: Nassouhi king list, Istanbul A. 116 (Assur 8836),) gives his father as Ashur-rim-nisheshu, probably in error. He succeeded his nephew, Ashur-nadin-ahhe II, being succeeded himself by the rather more prominent king Ashur-uballit I. He was the 72nd on the Assyrian King List and ruled for around 27 years.

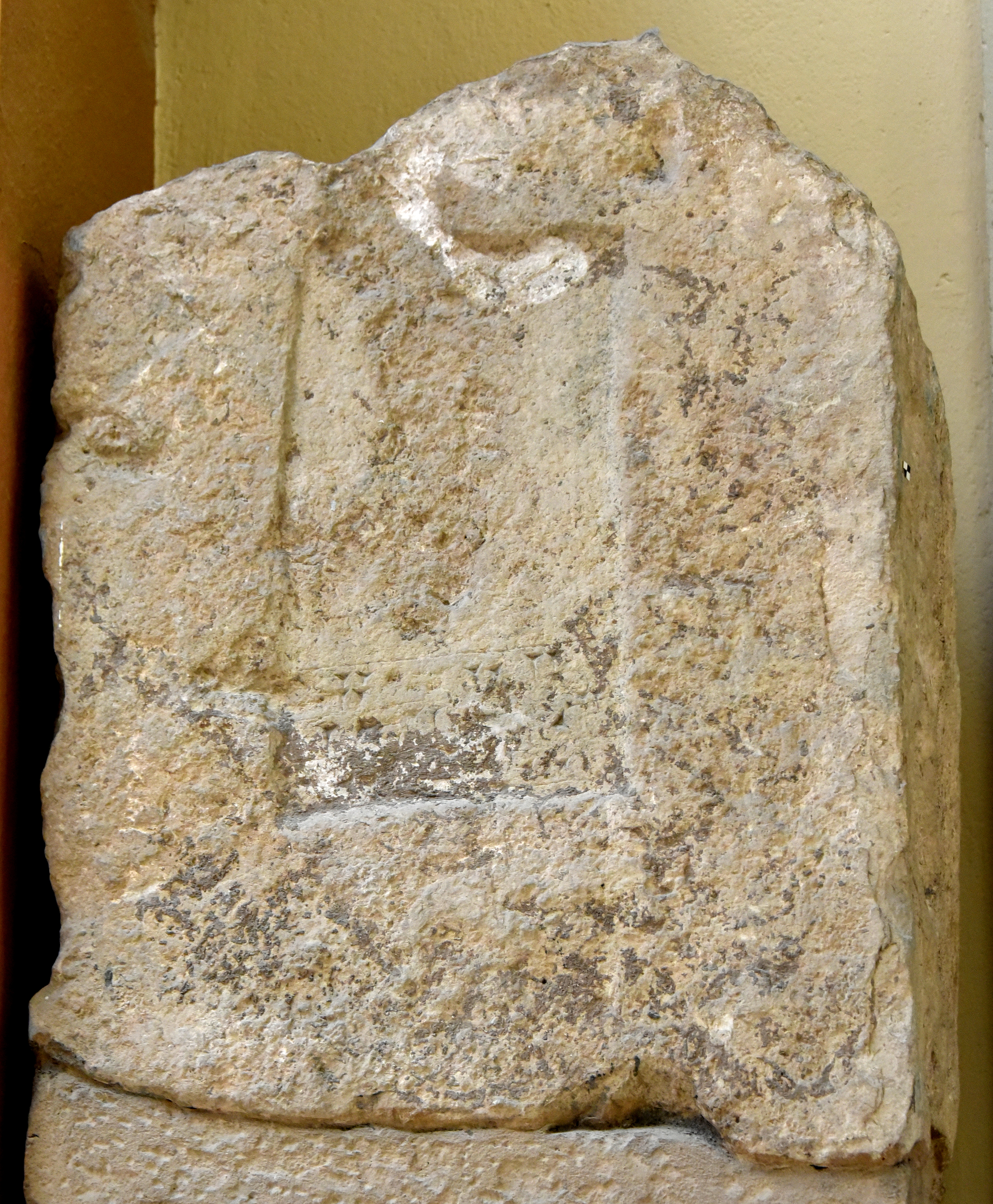
Stele of king Eriba-Adad I, from the Rows of Stelae at Assur, Iraq. Pergamon Museum.

== Biography ==
The circumstances surrounding his accession are unknown, although most nephew-uncle successions recorded in Assyrian history were bloody affairs. He styled himself “regent of Enlil”, the first Assyrian monarch to do so since Shamshi-Adad I. His uninscribed royal seal shows a heraldic group which includes two winged griffin-demons flanking a small tree and supporting a winged sun-disc above their wings and a double-headed griffin-demon holding two griffin-demons by their ankles, a radical departure from the earlier style, which was to set a precedent for the later Assyrian glyptic. It was found impressed into middle Assyrian contract tablets. (Note: Tablet VAT 9009, Ass. 14446t.) (Note: Tablet VAT 8804 = KAJ 153.)

He probably began his reign overshadowed by Mitanni, although this is unclear, as the two kings preceding him appear to have conducted treaties unhindered by Mitanni. However, Mitanni became entangled in a dynastic battle between Tushratta and his brother Artatama II, and after this, his son Shuttarna III, who called himself king of the Hurri, while seeking military and political support from the Assyrians. A pro-Assyrian faction appeared at the royal Mitanni court, which enabled Assyria to exert influence over Mitanni.

Several of the Limmu officials, the noblemen from which the Assyrian Eponym dating system was derived, are known for this period as they date commercial records, but relatively few can be assigned directly to Eriba-Adad's reign rather than that of his successor. One official might be Assur-muttakil, (the governor of Qabra, an Assyrian fortress town on the lesser Zab), who inherited his position from his father Ashur-Dayan and bequeathed it to his son. Eriba-Adad I's stela was the earliest of the stelae identified in the Stelenriehe, "row of stelae," the two rows of stone monuments uncovered in Assur. The later Assyrian king, Ninurta-apal-Ekur, son of Ilī-padâ, was to claim descent from him in his inscriptions.

== Inscriptions ==
Preceded by Ashur-nadin-ahhe II	King of Assyria c. 1391 – c. 1364 BC	Succeeded by Ashur-uballit I
