= Itamar Singer =

Romanian-born Israeli historian (1946–2012)

- איתמר זינגר
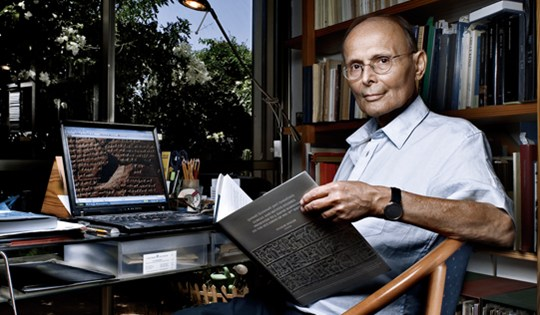
- Singer in 2010
- Born: November 26, 1946; Dej, Transylvania, Romania
- Died: September 19, 2012 (aged 65)
- Education: Hebrew University of Jerusalem, University of Marburg
- Known for: Research on Ancient Near East, Hittite culture, Pax Hethitica
- Spouse: Dr. Graciela Noemi Gestoso
- Awards: EMET Prize (2010)
- Scientific career
- Fields: History, Archaeology, Hittitology
- Workplaces: Tel Aviv University
- Doctoral advisor: Heinrich Otten

Itamar Singer (Hebrew: איתמר זינגר; November 26, 1946 – September 19, 2012) was an Israeli author and historian of Jewish-Romanian origin. He is known for his research of the Ancient Near East and as a leading Hittitologist, pioneering the study of this ancient Anatolians culture in Israel and elucidating the tensions which brought about its demise.

== Personal background ==
Itamar Singer was born on November 26, 1946, in Dej, in the multiethnic Transylvanian region of Romania. He was the son of Zoltán and Gertrude Singer. The Hungarian-speaking family moved to Cluj (Kolozsvár) when Singer was five years old. They relocated to Israel in 1958, where they settled in the new town of Holon.

Singer married Argentinean-born Egyptologist, Dr. Graciela Noemi Gestoso.

== Career ==
He studied for his bachelor's degree in archaeology and geography at the Hebrew University of Jerusalem graduating in 1968 and then went on to pursue his masters at Tel Aviv while fulfilling his national service obligation concurrently in the Israeli airforce. His Hittite studies were to continue at the University of Marburg, Germany, under the auspices of Heinrich Otten, resulting in his doctor-ship and yielding an influential thesis on "The Hittite KI.LAM Festival" in 1978. He joined the Department of Archaeology and Near East Cultures at Tel Aviv, at times simultaneously teaching in the Department of Jewish History and other educational establishments. He reached full professorship in 1996 and remained in this position until retiring due to poor health in 2008.

The focus of his academic interest was in what he termed the Pax Hethitica, a period of the 13th century BC – a golden age of international diplomatic relations between the great powers and with their Levantine vassals. He was the first researcher to theorize that it was the internal rivalries and the schism which rendered the Hittite empire vulnerable to the Bronze Age collapse and the coup de grace delivered by the Sea Peoples and others. His publications numbered over a hundred papers in academic journals, to which he continued to contribute well into retirement. For several years he was a member of the editorial board of the scholarly journal Antiguo Oriente.

In 2010, Itamar Singer was awarded the EMET Prize.

== Selected publications ==
- Singer, Itamar. The Hittite KI.LAM Festival, 2 Vols, Harrassowitz, 1983, 1984.
- Singer, Itamar and Izre'el, Shlomo. The General's Letter from Ugarit: A Linguistic and Historical Reevaluation of RS 20.33, Tel Aviv University, 1990.
- Singer, Itamar. Muwatalli's Prayer, ASOR, 1996.
- Singer, Itamar. Hittite Prayers, Society of Biblical Literature, 2002.
- Singer, Itamar. The Hittites and their Culture (in Hebrew), Jerusalem, 2009.
- Singer, Itamar. The Calm before the Storm: Selected Writings of Itamar Singer on the End of the Late Bronze Age in Anatolia and the Levant, Society of Biblical Literature, 2010.
- Singer, Itamar. The failed reforms of Akhenaten and Muwatalli, British Museum Studies in Ancient Egypt and Sudan (BMSAES) 6 (2006), pp.37–58
