= Shalmaneser I =

Assyrian king

- King of Assyria; King of All Peoples

King of the Middle Assyrian Empire
- Reign: 1273–1244 BC; 1263-1234 BC
- Predecessor: Adad-nirari I
- Successor: Tukulti-Ninurta I
- Issue: Tukulti-Ninurta I
- Father: Adad-nirari I

Shalmaneser I (𒁹𒀭𒁲𒈠𒉡𒊕 ^{md}sál-ma-nu-SAG Salmanu-ašared; 1273–1244 BC or 1265–1235 BC) was a king of Assyria during the Middle Assyrian Empire. He was the son and successor of Adad-nirari I.

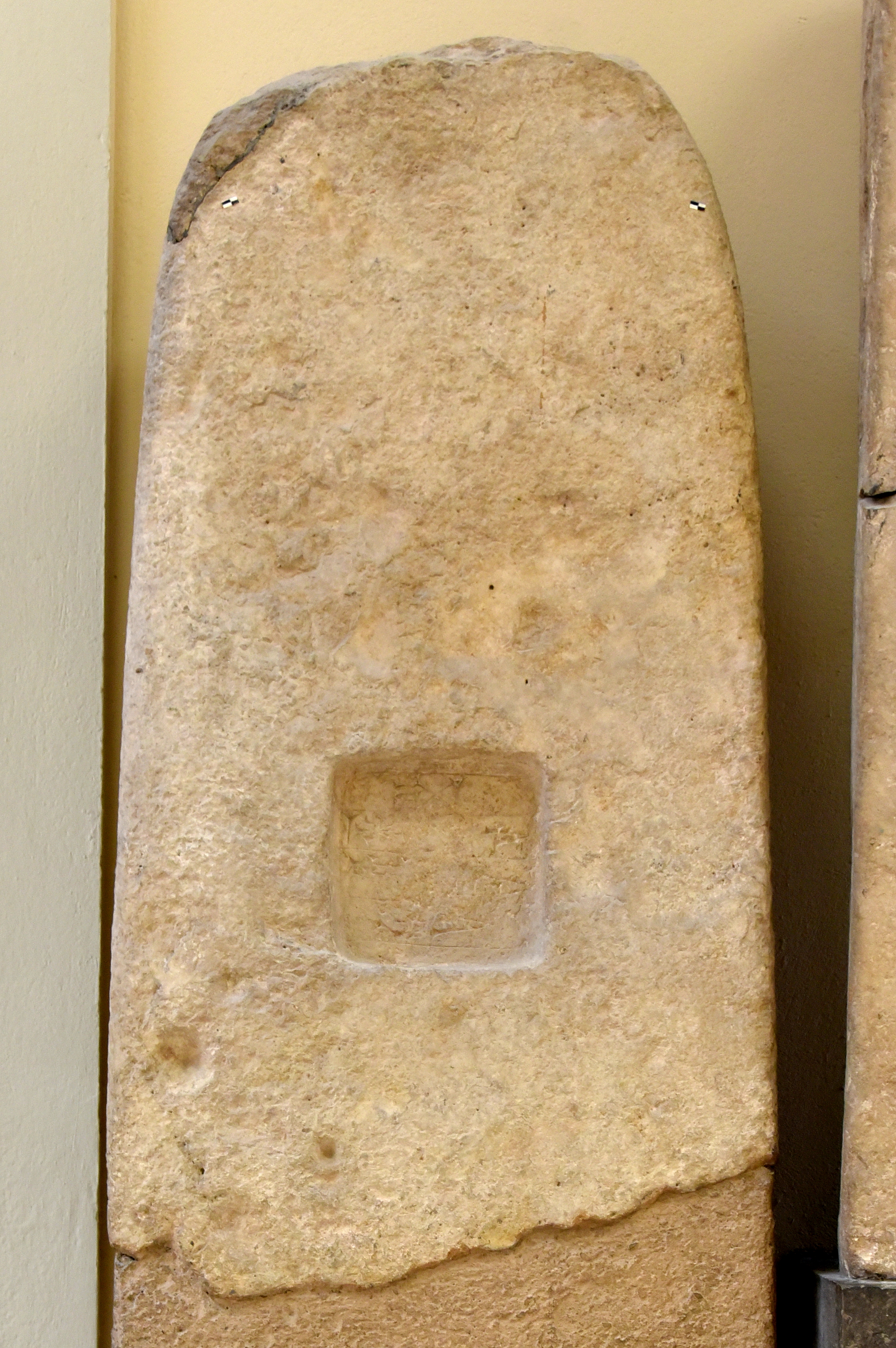
Stele of king Shalmaneser I, 1263-1234 BCE. From Assur, Iraq. Pergamon Museum

== Reign ==
According to his annals, discovered at Assur, in his first year he conquered eight countries in Anatolia to the northwest of Assyria, and destroyed the fortress of Arinnu, the dust of which he brought to Assur.

In his second year he defeated Shattuara, king of Hanilgalbat (Mitanni), and his Hittite and Ahlamu allies. He incorporated the remains of the Mittanni kingdom as part of one of the Assyrian provinces. Shalmaneser I also claimed to have blinded 14,400 enemy prisoners in one eye. He was one of the first Assyrian kings known to deport his defeated enemies to various lands.

He conquered the whole country from Taidu to Irridu, from Mount Kashiar to Eluhat, and from the fortresses of Sudu and Harranu to Levantine Carchemish on the Euphrates. He scored a number of military victories over the Hittite Empire, Babylonia and over polities in the Levant, Anatolia and Zagros, expanding the Middle Assyrian Empire, built palaces at Assur, Nineveh and Arbela, restored the "world-temple" at Assur (Ehursagkurkurra), and founded the city of Kalhu (the biblical Calah/Nimrud). He was succeeded by his son Tukulti-Ninurta I.

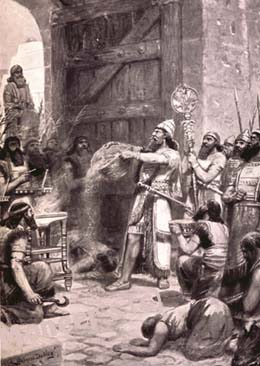
Shalmaneser I pours out the dust of Arina before his God, illustration in Hutchinson's Story of the Nations

Annual limmu officials beginning with the year of accession of Šulmanu-ašared. The list is partly derived from Freydank and McIntyre. The exact order of the earliest limmus is conjectural but the ordering from Šerriya onwards is essentially fixed.

== Sources ==
- Dönbaz, Veysel, and Grant, Frame (1983). "The building activities of Shalmaneser I in Northern Mesopotamia". Annual Review of the Royal Inscriptions of Mesopotamia Project 1 (1983): 1–5.

Preceded by Adad-nirari I	King of Assyria; 1273–1244 BC	Succeeded by Tukulti-Ninurta I
