= Tukulti-Ninurta I =

King of Assyria

- King of Assyria; King of Sumer and Akkad; King of the Four Corners of the World; King of All Peoples; King of kings
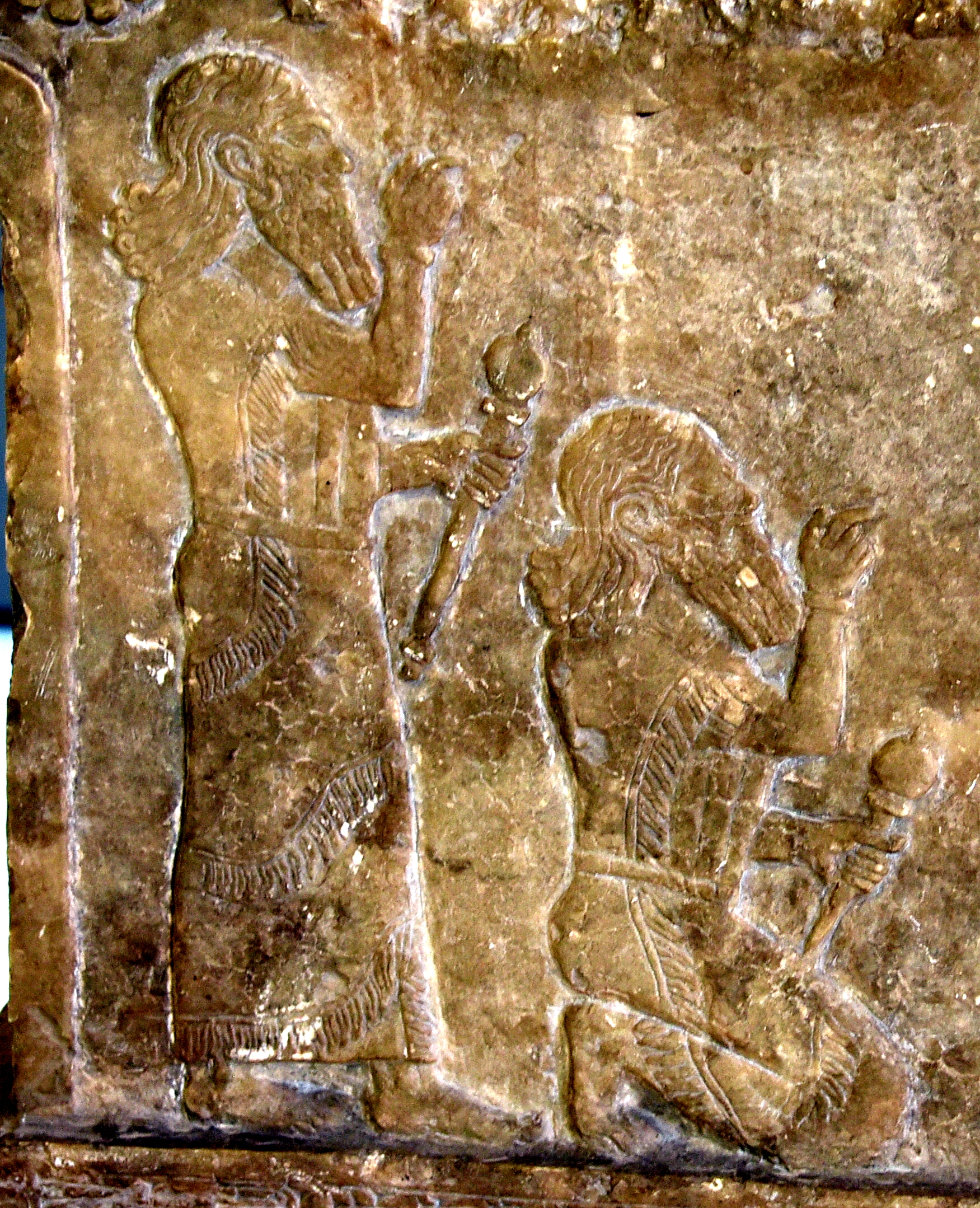
- Tukulti-Ninurta I depicted both standing and kneeling

King of the Middle Assyrian Empire
- Reign: 37 regnal years 1243–1207 BC (high); 1233–1197 BC (low)
- Predecessor: Shalmaneser I
- Successor: Ashur-nadin-apli
- Issue: Ashur-nadin-apli, Enlil-kudurri-usur
- Father: Shalmaneser I

Tukulti-Ninurta I (lit. 'my trust is in [the warrior god] Ninurta'; reigned c. 1243–1207 BC) was a king of Assyria during the Middle Assyrian Empire. He is the first king known to use the title "King of Kings".

== Reign ==
Tukulti-Ninurta I succeeded Shalmaneser I, his father, as king and won a major victory against the Hittite Empire at the Battle of Nihriya in the first half of his reign, appropriating Hittite territory in Asia Minor and the Levant. Tukulti-Ninurta I retained Assyrian control of Urartu, and later defeated Kaštiliašu IV, the Kassite king of Babylonia, and captured the rival city of Babylon to ensure full Assyrian supremacy over Mesopotamia. He set himself up as king of Babylon, and took on the ancient title "King of Sumer and Akkad" first used by Ur-Nammu.

=== Babylonian victory ===
Tukulti-Ninurta had petitioned the god Shamash before beginning his counter offensive. Kashtiliash IV was captured, single-handed by Tukulti-Ninurta according to his account, who "trod with my feet upon his lordly neck as though it were a footstool" and deported him ignominiously in chains to Assyria. The victorious Assyrian demolished the walls of Babylon, massacred many of the inhabitants, pillaged and plundered his way across the city to the Esagila temple, where he made off with the Statue of Marduk. After capturing Babylonia, he invaded the Arabian Peninsula, conquering the pre-Arab states of Dilmun and Meluhha. Middle Assyrian texts recovered at ancient Dūr-Katlimmu include a letter from Tukulti-Ninurta to his sukkal rabi'u, or grand vizier, Ashur-iddin advising him of the approach of his general Shulman-mushabshu escorting the captive Kashtiliash, his wife, and his retinue which incorporated a large number of women, on his way to exile after his defeat. In the process he defeated the Elamites, who had themselves coveted Babylon. He also wrote an epic poem documenting his wars against Babylon and Elam. After a Babylonian revolt, he raided and plundered the temples in Babylon, regarded as an act of sacrilege to all Mesopotamians, including Assyrians.

=== Conspiracy ===
As relations with the priesthood in Aššur began deteriorating, Tukulti-Ninurta built a new capital city, Kar-Tukulti-Ninurta. However, his sons rebelled against him and besieged him there. During the siege, he was murdered. One of them, Ashur-nadin-apli, would succeed him on the throne.

=== Death ===
After his death, the Assyrian Empire fell into a brief period of stagnation. The Tukulti-Ninurta Epic describes the war between Tukulti-Ninurta I and Kashtiliash IV.

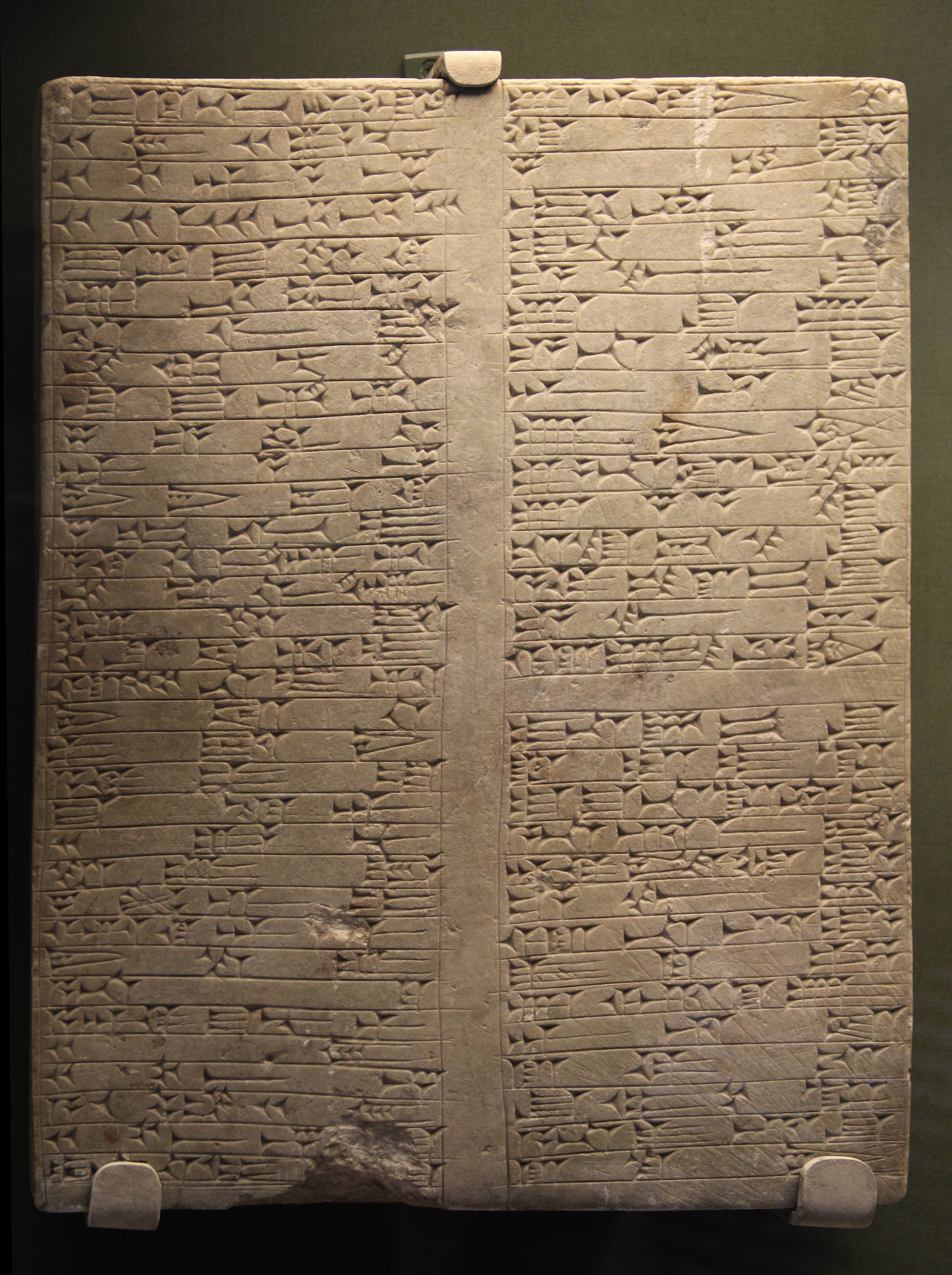
Stela of Tukulti-Ninurta I. Describes how he rebuilt the temple of the goddess Dinitu from its foundations. "I built within a lofty dais and an awesome sanctuary for the abode of the goddess Dinitu, my mistress, and deposited my stelas." From Assur, northern Iraq.

== Sources ==
| Preceded by Shalmaneser I | King of Assyria; 1243 BC–1207 BC | Succeeded by Ashur-nadin-apli |
