= List of state leaders in the 11th century BC =

State leaders in the 12th century BC – State leaders in the 10th century BC – State leaders by year

This is a list of state leaders in the 11th century BC (1100–1001 BC).

== Africa: Northeast ==
Egypt: New Kingdom

- Twentieth Dynasty of the New Kingdom (complete list) –

- Ramesses XI, Pharaoh (1107–1077 BC)

Egypt: Third Intermediate Period

- Twenty-first Dynasty of the Third Intermediate Period (complete list) –

- Smendes, Pharaoh (1077–1051 BC)
- Amenemnisu, Pharaoh (1051–1047 BC)
- Psusennes I, Pharaoh (1047–1001 BC)
- Amenemope, Pharaoh (1001–992 BC)

Kush

- Kingdom of Kush (complete list) –

- Kandake Makeda, King (c.1005–950 BC)

== Asia ==
=== Asia: East ===
China

- Shang, China (complete list) –

- Di Yi, King (c.1101–c.1076 BC)
- Zhou, King (c.1075–1046 BC)

- Zhou, China: Western Zhou (complete list) –

- Wen, King (c.1099–c.1050 BC)
- Wu, King (c.1046–1043 BC)
- Dan, Regent, Duke (c.1042 BC)
- Cheng, King (c.1042–1021 BC)
- Kang, King (c.1020–996 BC)

=== Asia: Southeast ===
Vietnam

- Hồng Bàng dynasty (complete list) –

- Bính line, (c.1161–c.1055 BC)
- Đinh line, (c.1054–c.969 BC)

=== Asia: West ===
- Kingdom of united Israel –

Chronologies as established by Albright
- Saul, King (1030–1010 BC)
- Ish-bosheth, King of northern Israel (c.1000 BC)
- David, King (1000–962 BC)

- Assyria: Middle Assyrian Period

- Tiglath-Pileser I, King (c.1115–1076 BC)
- Asharid-apal-Ekur, King (c.1076–1074 BC)
- Ashur-bel-kala, King (c.1074–1056 BC)
- Eriba-Adad II, King (c.1056–1054 BC)
- Shamshi-Adad IV, King (c.1054–1050 BC)
- Ashur-nasir-pal I, King (c.1050–1031 BC)
- Shalmaneser II, King (c.1031–1019 BC)
- Ashur-nirari IV, King (c.1019–1013 BC)
- Ashur-rabi II, King (c.1013–972 BC)

- Middle Babylonian period: Second Dynasty of Isin (complete list) –

- Enlil-nadin-apli, King (c.1103–1100 BC)
- Marduk-nadin-ahhe, King (c.1100–1082 BC)
- Marduk-shapik-zeri, King (c.1082–1069 BC)
- Adad-apla-iddina, King (c.1069–1046 BC)
- Marduk-ahhe-eriba, King (c.1046 BC)
- Marduk-zer-X, King (c.1046–1033 BC)
- Nabu-shum-libur, King (c.1033–1025 BC)

- Middle Babylonian period: Second Sealand dynasty (complete list) –

- Simbar-shipak, King (c.1025–1008 BC)
- Ea-mukin-zeri, King (c.1008 BC)
- Kashshu-nadin-ahi, King (c.1008–1004 BC)

- Middle Babylonian period: Bazi dynasty (complete list) –

- Eulmash-shakin-shumi, King (c.1004–987 BC)

- Diauehi –

- Sien, King (c.1120–1100 BC)

- Elam: Shutrukid dynasty (complete list) –

- Shilhina-hamru-Lagamar, King (early 11th century BC)
- Humban-Numena II, King (early 11th century BC)
- Shutruk-Nahhunte II, King (mid-11th century BC)
- Shutur-Nahhunte I, King (mid-11th century BC)

== Europe: Balkans ==
- Athens (complete list) –

- Melanthus, King (1126–1089 BC) presumed legendary or semi-historical
- Codrus, King (1089–1068 BC) presumed legendary or semi-historical
- Medon, hereditary perpetual Archon (1068–1048 BC)
- Acastus, hereditary perpetual Archon (1048–1012 BC)
- Archippus, hereditary perpetual Archon (1012–993 BC)
