= 1050s BC =

Decade

The 1050s BC is a decade that lasted from 1059 BC to 1050 BC.

== Events and trends ==
- 1057 BC—According to Josephus, Solomon's Temple finishes construction on January 19. This predates secular estimates by more than 120 years and is not considered reliable or accurate.
- 1054 BC—Shamshi-Adad IV, son of Tiglath-Pileser I, usurps the Assyrian throne from his nephew, Eriba-Adad II.
- 1053 BC—Death of Kang, king of the Zhou of ancient China. In September, a five-planetary alignment occurs.
- 1052 BC—Zhao succeeds Kang.
- 1051 BC—Saul becomes the first King of ancient Israel.
- 1050 BC—Death of Shamshi-Adad IV; his son, Ashurnasirpal I, succeeds him as King of Assyria.
- 1050 BC—Philistines capture the Ark of the Covenant from Israel in battle. (Approximate date)
- c. 1050 BC—The Shang dynasty ends in ancient China and is replaced by the Zhou dynasty.
- c. 1050 BC—Proto-Geometric period starts in ancient Greece.

== Significant people ==
- Simbar-shipak, king of Babylon, is born (approximate date).
- Ish-Bosheth, king of Israel, is born (approximate date).
