= Isin =

Ancient city in Mesopotamia

- Ishan al-Bahriyat
- Location within Iraq
- 31°53′06″N 45°16′07″E
- Type: Settlement
- Periods: Early Dynastic, Isin-Larsa, Old Babylonian, Kassite, Neo-Babylonian
- Location: Al-Qādisiyyah Governorate, Iraq
- Region: Mesopotamia

Site notes
- Excavation dates: 1924, 1926, 1973-1989
- Archaeologists: Stephen Herbert Langdon, Raymond P. Dougherty, Barthel Hrouda

Isin (Sumerian: 𒉌𒋛𒅔𒆠, romanized: I_{3}-si-in^{ki}, modern Arabic: إيشان بحريات Ishan al-Bahriyat) is an archaeological site in Al-Qādisiyyah Governorate, Iraq which was the location of the Ancient Near East city of Isin, occupied from the late 4th millennium BC Uruk period up until at least the late 1st millennium BC Neo-Babylonian period. It lies about 40 km (25 mi) southeast of the modern city of Al Diwaniyah.

The tutelary deity of Isin, dating back to at least the Early Dynastic period, was the healing goddess Gula with a major temple (, E-gal-ma) sited there as well as smaller installations for the related gods of Ninisina and Sud.

== Archaeology ==
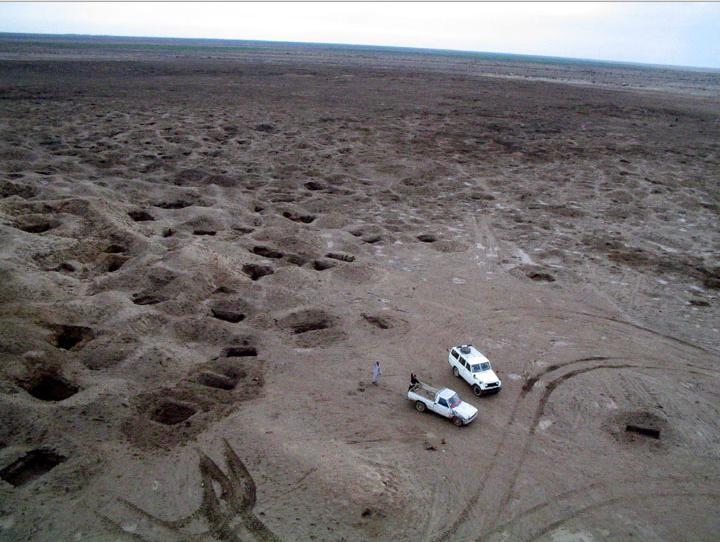
Looters at the site of Isin

Isin is located approximately 20 miles (32 km) south of the ancient city of Nippur. The site covers an area of about 150 hectares with a maximum height of about 10 meters.

By 1922 the site had been suggested as that of Isin. Ishan al-Bahriyat was visited by Stephen Herbert Langdon for a day to conduct a sounding, while he was excavating at Kish in 1924. He found inscribed bricks of Ishme-Dagan and Enlil-bani. Two years later Raymond P. Dougherty, on behalf of the American Schools of Oriental Research, conducted a two-day survey of the site finding inscribed bricks of Bur-Sin and Neo-Babylonian ruler Nebuchadnezzar II.

Modern archaeological work at Isin was accomplished in 11 seasons between 1973 and 1989 by a team of German archaeologists led by Barthel Hrouda on behalf of the Munich Institute for Near Eastern Archaeology. Hundreds of cuneiform tablets from the Old Babylonian period, in buildings abandoned after being destroyed by fire, were recovered. However, as was the case at many sites in Iraq, research was interrupted by the Gulf War (1990–1991) and the Iraq War (2003 to 2011). Since the end of excavations, extensive looting is reported to have resumed at the site. Even when the German team began their work, the site had already been heavily looted. A significant find, in the Ninurta shrine of the Gula temple, was an alabaster mace head of the Akkadian Empire ruler Manishtushu inscribed "Man-istusu, king of the world, dedicated (this mace) to the goddess Ninisina". An inscription of Takil-ilissu, ruler of Malgium was also found. Early find included a Jemdet Nasr stamp seal and a small stone lion figurine of the Uruk period.

The primary focus of the excavations was the four meter wide wall enclosed Gula temple complex. The complex showed construction through at least the Isin I, Kassite, and Neo-Babylonian periods with 3rd millennium BC finds suggested its earlier existence. Finds included 30 dog burials, copper pendants inscribed with dog images, and clay dog figurines, one with a prayer to Gula. An inscribed brick of Adad-apla-iddina, 8th ruler of the 2nd dynasty of Isin, dedicated to the healing goddess Nin-ezena was also found. On another section of the main mound 3rd millennium BC buildings provided "gold jewellery, bronze weapons, cylinder seals, and a few cuneiform tablets of which two date back to the Early Dynastic period", a clay nail of Isme-Dagan referring to construction of the bad-gal "Great Wall" city wall of Isin and an inscribed brick of Ur-du-kuga. In the Kassite layer an Early Dynastic III statue, 16.5 cm in height, of a kneeling man wearing only a triple belt. Just to the south of the temple complex two Early Dynastic I period buildings were found.

== History ==
Isin sat on the Isinnitum canal, a vital branch of the Euphrates. Controlling Isin meant controlling the water flow and trade moving toward the south.

=== Chalcolithic ===
The site of Isin was occupied at least as early as the Ubaid period based on pottery shards.

=== Early Bronze Age ===
==== Early Dynastic period ====
In the Early Dynastic III (c. 2750-2350 BC), significant occupation began.

==== Akkadian period ====
In the Akkadian period (c. 2350-2150 BC), Isin is known to have been occupied by the Akkadian Empire.

==== Ur III period ====
An intensive building program began at Isin during the Ur III empire in the late 3rd millennium BC. With the fall of Ur, an Amorite dynasty took power in the city, during the Isin-Larsa period. The city then fell to Babylon and suffered a period of abandonment. Activity resumed under the Kassites, followed by a period of local control. Isin was occupied to various degrees until the Neo-Babylonian period.

With the final decline of the Ur III empire at the end of the third millennium BC, a power vacuum was left that other city-states scrambled to fill. Ishbi-Erra, said to be an Amorite, from Mari, and an Ur III official under its final ruler Ibbi-Sin, gained rulership of Isin and began the First Dynasty of Isin. The Elamites had attacked Isin and Ur, capturing Ur. One of Ishbi-Erra's acts was to expel the Elamites from Ur and the region, his year name being "Year (Iszbi-Irra the king) brought out of Ur, with his strong weapon, the Elamite who was dwelling in its midst". Although the Sumerian King List gives a 33-year reign for Ishbi-Erra only one royal inscription has been found.

"For the god Enlil, lord of the foreign lands, his lord, Isbi-Err[a], mighty king, lord of <his> land, fashioned a great lyre for him, which ... the heart. He dedicated it [for his own] life. The name of this lyre is 'Isbi-Erra trusts in the god Enlil'."

=== Middle Bronze Age ===
Following an abrupt climate change around 2036-2023 BC, probably caused by a major volcanic eruption, drought his the region and caused severe economic hardship which caused the Ur III to decline and ultimately end in 2004 BC. The province of Isin broke out and formed an independent kingdom under Ishbi-Erra, along with its rival Larsa, saw the decentralization of irrigation networks and agricultural fields.

==== Isin-Larsa period ====
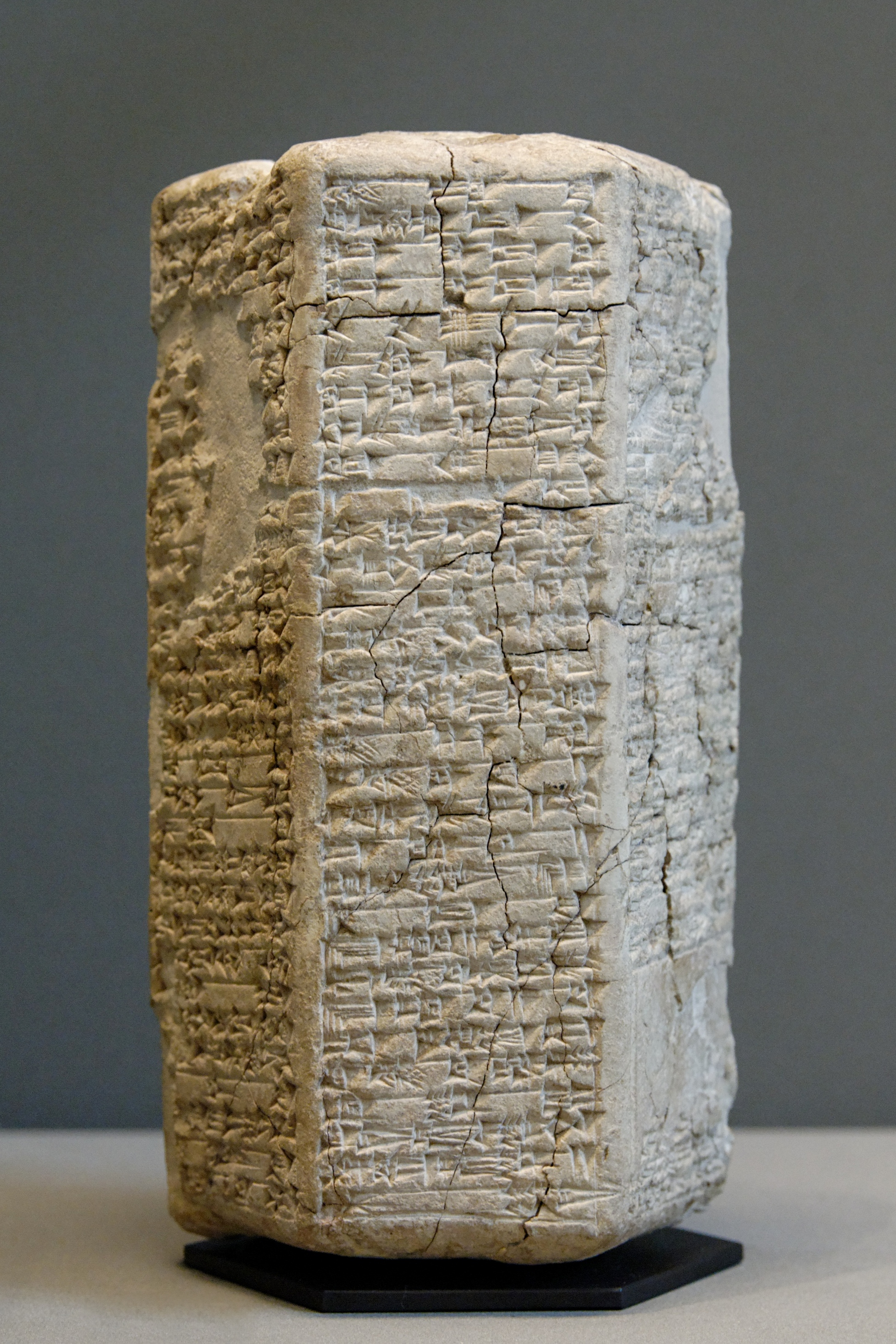
A praise poem to Iddin-Dagān from the site, currently at Musée du Louvre

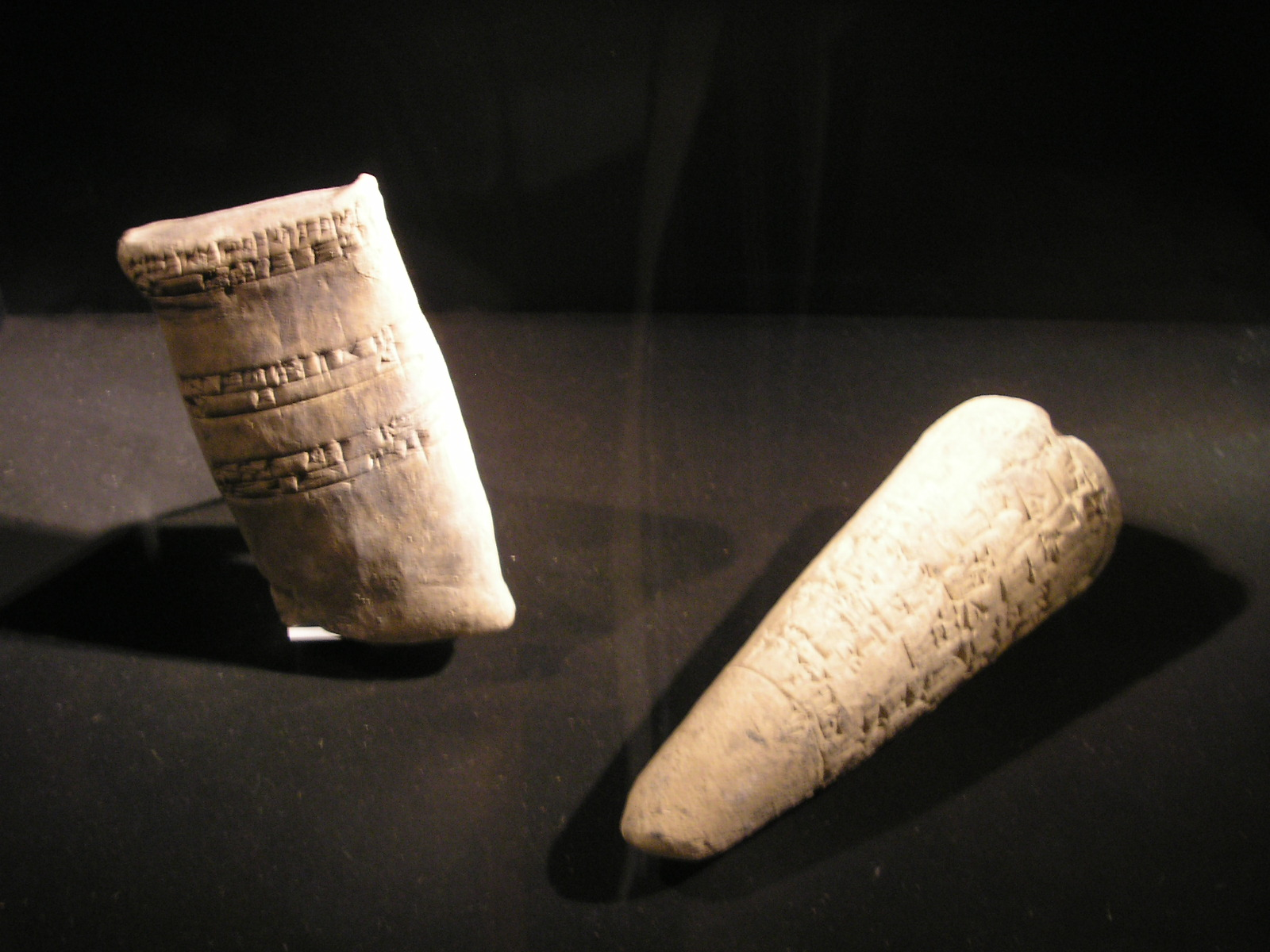
Left: Cuneiform clay tablet. Old Babylonian, 1900-1700 BC Right: Sumerian cuneiform "foundation stone". This clay cone was embedded in a wall, and contains the deed of foundation of the city walls of Isin (Tell Bahriyat) by king Ishme-Dagan of Isin (1953-1935 BC)

The First Dynasty of Isin was founded by Ishbi-Erra (r. 2018-1985 BC) and lasted over two centuries. Ishbi-Erra continued the traditions of the previous Ur III period, and Isin reached its peak and became a powerful city-state in the Middle Bronze I. A notable ruler was Ishme-Dagan (r. 1954-1935 BC) for whom a number of hymns were written, in a style thought to be imitative of Shulgi, the ruler of Ur III.

With the rise of Larsa and a number of smaller Amorite city-states, the influence of Isin slowly declined. The rivalry between Isin and Larsa has led this phase of the Middle Bronze I to be the term the Isin-Larsa period.

The exact events surrounding Isin's disintegration as a kingdom are mostly unknown, but some evidence can be pieced together. Documents indicate that access to water sources presented a huge problem for Isin. Isin also endured an internal coup of a sort when Gungunum the royally appointed governor of Larsa and Lagash province, seized the city of Ur. Ur had been the main center of the Gulf trade; thus this move economically devastated Isin. Additionally, Gungunum's two successors Abisare and Sumuel (c. 1905 BC and 1894 BC) both sought to cut Isin off from its canals by rerouting them into Larsa. At some point, Nippur was also lost. Isin would never recover. Around 1860 BC, an outsider named Enlil-bani seized the throne of Isin, ending the hereditary dynasty established by Ishbi-Erra over 150 years earlier.

Although politically and economically weak, Isin maintained its independence from Larsa for at least another forty years, ultimately succumbing to Larsa's ruler Rim-Sin I.

==== Old Babylonian period ====
After the First Dynasty of Babylon rose to power in the early 2nd millennium and captured Larsa, much significant construction occurred at Isin.

For most of his reign, Hammurabi of Babylon (r. 1792-1750 BC) was an ally of Rim-Sin I, the long-lived king of Larsa who controlled Isin. However, in his 30th and 31st regnal years (c.1763-1762 BC), Hammurabi turned his military focus southward against Isin-Larsa. Larsa became a provincial administrative center in the Babylonian Empire.

In 1723 BC, the Isin was fell in the 27th year of the reign of Samsu-iluna (r. 1749-1712 BC), based on tablets found there. The year name reads: ""The year in which Samsu-iluna the king (destroyed) the wall of Isin...". The word "destroyed" often mean the destruction of fortifications such as city-walls. Shortly after the wars of Samsu-iluna, the irrigation systems in the Isin-Nippur region suffered a catastrophic failure. This may have been a deliberate "scorched earth" tactic or a byproduct of the lack of centralized maintenance during the revolt. Following Samsu-iluna’s reign, archaeological layers show a massive hiatus. Isin, along with Nippur and Uruk, was largely abandoned. The city does not show significant signs of re-occupation until the Kassite Period (c. 1400 BC).

=== Late Bronze Age ===
==== Kassite period ====
The Kassites took over in Babylon after its sack in 1531 BC, resumed building at Isin. Activity was primarily at the Gula temple and it appears that in that period Isin was only a cult center.

=== Iron and Classical Age ===
The final significant stage of activity occurred during the Second Dynasty of Isin at the end of the 2nd millennium, most notably by king Adad-apla-iddina. Isin remained occupied at least as late as the second decade of the reign of the Persian ruler Darius I (c 507 BC), then in the control of the region.

Of the at least 256 ruler year names about 75% have been found. Most have the standard format, aside from Bur-Sin who numbered his years. These year names combined with new tablet joins show that there were two additional rulers, Sumu-abum and Ikūn-pī-Išta, slotting in between Erra-imittī and Enlil-bān. The reign of Sumu-abum lasted less than a year.

== Culture and literature ==
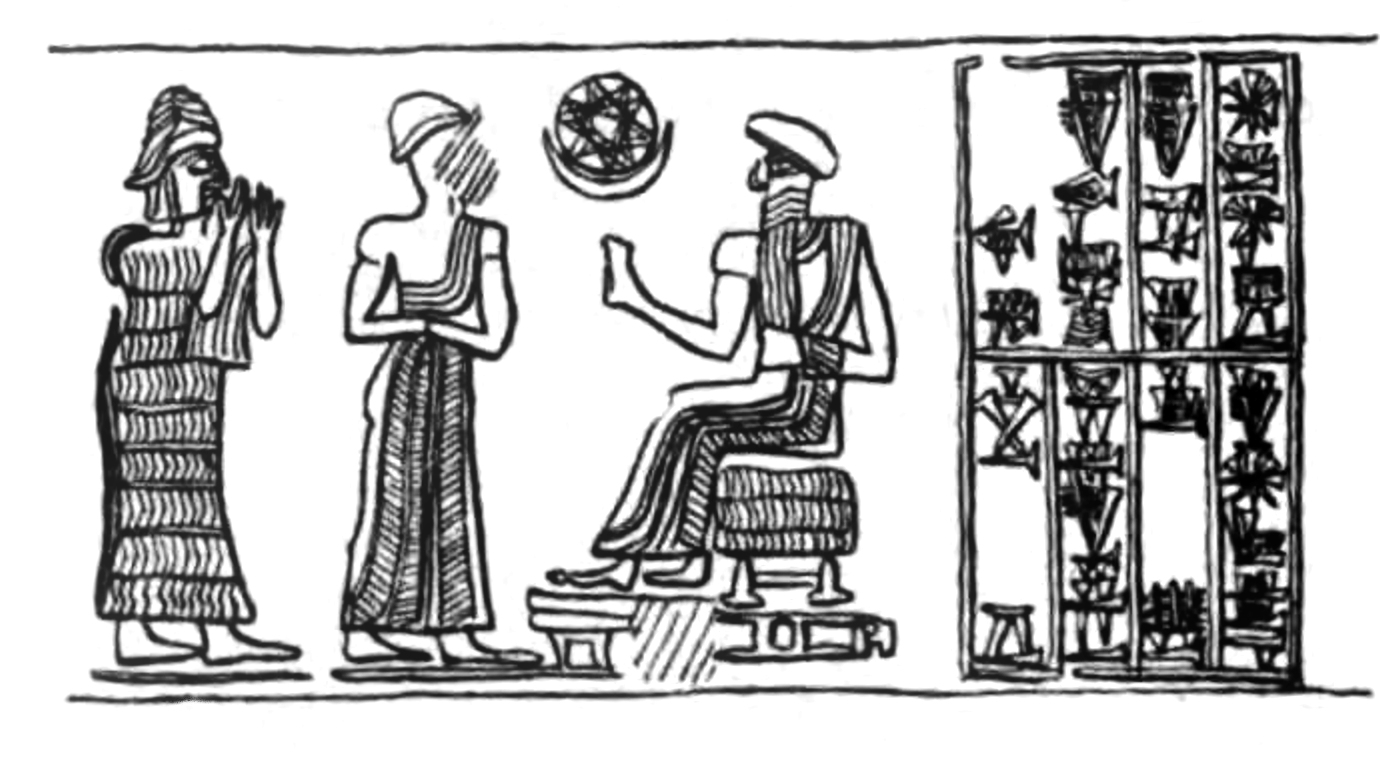
Cylinder seal of Bur-Suen.

The city lay on the Isinnitum Canal, part of a set of waterways that connected the cities of Mesopotamia. The patron deity of Isin was Nintinuga (Gula) goddess of healing, and a temple to her was built there. The Isin king Enlil-bani reported building a temple to Gula named E-ni-dub-bi, a temple for Sud named E-dim-gal-an-na, a temple E-ur-gi-ra to Ninisina, as well as a temple for the god Ninbgal.

Ishbi-Erra continued many of the cultic practices that had flourished in the preceding Ur III period. He continued acting out the sacred marriage ritual each year. During this ritual, the king played the part of the mortal Dumuzi, and he had sex with a priestess who represented the goddess of love and war, Inanna (also known as Ishtar). This was thought to strengthen the king's relationship to the gods, which would then bring stability and prosperity on the entire country.

The Isin kings continued also the practice of appointing their daughters official priestesses of the moon god of Ur.

The literature of the period also continued in the line of the Ur III traditions when the Isin dynasty was first begun. For example, the royal hymn, a genre started in the preceding millennium, was continued. Many royal hymns written for the Isin rulers mirrored the themes, structure, and language of the Ur ones. Sometimes the hymns were written in the first person of a king's voice; other times, they were pleas of ordinary citizens meant for the ears of a king (sometimes an already dead one).

It was during this period that the Sumerian King List attained its final form, though it used many much earlier sources. The very compilation of the List seems to lead up to the Isin Dynasty itself, which would give it much legitimacy in the minds of the people because the dynasty would then be linked to earlier (albeit sometimes legendary) kings.

== List of rulers ==
The Sumerian King List (SKL) gives a list of the rulers of only one dynasty of Isin. The first Sealand, Kassite, and second Isin dynasties are known from the Babylonian King List (BKL). The following list should not be considered complete:

#	Portrait or inscription	Ruler	Approx. date and length of reign	Comments, notes, and references for mentions
Ur III period (c. 2119 – c. 2004 BC)
First dynasty of Isin / Isin I dynasty (c. 2018 – c. 1792 BC)
1st		Ishbi-Erra 𒀭𒅖𒁉𒀴𒊏	r. c. 2018 – c. 1985 BC (MC) r. c. 1953 – c. 1921 BC (SC) (32 or 33 years)	temp. of Ibbi-Suen; Said on the SKL to have held the title of, "King" of not just Akkad; but, to have held the "Kingship" over all of Sumer; An Amorite from Mari
#	Portrait or inscription	Ruler	Approx. date and length of reign	Comments, notes, and references for mentions
Isin-Larsa period (c. 2004 – c. 1787 BC)
"Then Ur was defeated. The very foundation of Sumer was torn out. The kingship was taken to Isin." — Sumerian King List (SKL)
2nd		Shu-Ilishu 𒋗𒉌𒉌𒋗	r. c. 1985 – c. 1975 BC (MC) r. c. 1920 – c. 1911 BC (SC) (10, 15, or 20 years)	Son of Ishbi-Erra; temp. of Emisum; Held the title of, "King of Sumer and Akkad"
3rd		Iddin-Dagan 𒀭𒄿𒁷𒀭𒁕𒃶	r. c. 1975 – c. 1954 BC (MC) r. c. 1910 – c. 1890 BC (SC) (18, 21, or 25 years)	Son of Shu-Ilishu; temp. of Samium; Held the title of, "King of Sumer and Akkad"
4th		Ishme-Dagan 𒀭𒅖𒈨𒀭𒁕𒃶	r. c. 1954 – c. 1935 BC (MC) r. c. 1889 – c. 1871 BC (SC) (11, 18, 19, or 20 years)	Son of Iddin-Dagan; temp. of Zabaia; Held the title of, "King of Sumer and Akkad"
5th		Lipit-Ishtar 𒇷𒁉𒀉𒁹𒁯	r. c. 1935 – c. 1924 BC (MC) r. c. 1870 – c. 1860 BC (SC) (11 years)	temp. of Gungunum; Said on the SKL to have held the title of, "King" of not just Akkad; but, to have held the "Kingship" over all of Sumer; Held the title of, "King of Sumer and Akkad"
6th		Ur-Ninurta 𒀭𒌨𒀭𒊩𒌆𒅁	r. c. 1923 – c. 1896 BC (MC) r. c. 1859 – c. 1832 BC (SC) (28 years)	temp. of Abisare; Said on the SKL to have held the title of, "King" of not just Akkad; but, to have held the "Kingship" over all of Sumer; Held the title of, "King of Sumer and Akkad"
7th		Bur-Suen 𒀭𒁓𒀭𒂗𒍪	r. c. 1895 – c. 1874 BC (MC) r. c. 1831 – c. 1811 BC (SC) (21 or 22 years)	Son of Ur-Ninurta; temp. of Sumuel; Held the title of, "King of Sumer and Akkad"
8th		Lipit-Enlil 𒀭𒇷𒁉𒀉𒀭𒂗𒆤	r. c. 1873 – c. 1868 BC (MC) r. c. 1810 – c. 1806 BC (SC) (5 years)	Son of Bur-Suen; temp. of Puzur-Ashur II; Held the title of, "King of Sumer and Akkad"
9th		Erra-imitti 𒀭𒀴𒊏𒄿𒈪𒋾	r. c. 1868 – c. 1861 BC (MC) r. c. 1805 – c. 1799 BC (SC) (7 or 8 years)	temp. of Nur-Adad; Said on the SKL to have held the title of, "King" of not just Akkad; but, to have held the "Kingship" over all of Sumer; Held the title of, "King of Sumer and Akkad"
10th		Ikūn-pî-Ištar	r. c. 1861 – c. 1860 BC (MC) r. c. 1799 – c. 1798 BC (SC) (6 months or 1 year)	temp. of Sîn-kāšid
11th		Enlil-bani 𒀭𒂗𒆤𒁀𒉌	r. c. 1860 – c. 1836 BC (MC) r. c. 1798 – c. 1775 BC (SC) (24 years)	temp. of Naram-Sin; Said on the SKL to have held the title of, "King" of not just Akkad; but, to have held the "Kingship" over all of Sumer; Held the title of, "King of Sumer and Akkad"
12th		Zambiya 𒀭𒍝𒄠𒁉𒅀	r. c. 1836 – c. 1833 BC (MC) r. c. 1774 – c. 1772 BC (SC) (3 years)	temp. of Sin-Iqisham; Said on the SKL to have held the title of, "King" of not just Akkad; but, to have held the "Kingship" over all of Sumer; Held the title of, "King of Sumer and Akkad"
13th		Iter-pisha 𒀭𒄿𒋼𒅕𒅗𒊭	r. c. 1833 – c. 1829 BC (MC) r. c. 1771 – c. 1768 BC (SC) (3 or 4 years)	temp. of Sin-eribam; Said on the SKL to have held the title of, "King" of not just Akkad; but, to have held the "Kingship" over all of Sumer; Held the title of, "King of Sumer and Akkad"
14th		Ur-du-kuga 𒀭𒌨𒇯𒆬𒂵	r. c. 1829 – c. 1825 BC (MC) r. c. 1767 – c. 1764 BC (SC) (4 years)	temp. of Warad-Sin; Said on the SKL to have held the title of, "King" of not just Akkad; but, to have held the "Kingship" over all of Sumer; Held the title of, "King of Sumer and Akkad"
15th		Suen-magir 𒀭𒂗𒍪𒈠𒄫	r. c. 1825 – c. 1814 BC (MC) r. c. 1763 – c. 1753 BC (SC) (11 years)	temp. of Apil-Sin; Said on the SKL to have held the title of, "King" of not just Akkad; but, to have held the "Kingship" over all of Sumer; Held the title of, "King of Sumer and Akkad"
16th		Damiq-ilishu 𒁕𒈪𒅅𒉌𒉌𒋗	r. c. 1814 – c. 1792 BC (MC) r. c. 1752 – c. 1730 BC (SC) (23 years)	Son of Suen-magir; temp. of Shamshi-Adad I; Held the title of, "King of Sumer and Akkad"
"16 kings; they ruled for 226 years and 6 months. A total of 39 kings ruled for 14,409 years, 3 months and 3½ days, 4 times in Kish. A total of 22 kings ruled for 2,610 years, 6 months, and 15 days, 5 times in Uruk. A total of 12 kings ruled for 396 years, 3 times in Ur. A total of 3 kings ruled for 356 years, once in Awan. A total of 1 king ruled for 7 years, once in Hamazi. A total of 11 kings ruled for 197 years, once in Akkad. A total of 23 kings ruled for 125 years and 40 days, once in the army of Gutium. A total of 16 kings ruled for 226 years, once in Isin. There are 11 cities, cities in which the kingship was exercised. A total of 139 kings, who altogether ruled for 3,443 years." — SKL
#	Portrait or inscription	Ruler	Approx. date and length of reign	Comments, notes, and references for mentions
Dynasty of Larsa (c. 1792 – c. 1787 BC)
		Rim-Sîn I 𒀭𒊑𒅎𒀭𒂗𒍪	r. c. 1792 – c. 1787 BC (MC)	Son of Kudur-Mabuk; temp. of Irdanene; Held the title of, "King of Sumer and Akkad"
#	Portrait or inscription	Ruler	Approx. date and length of reign	Comments, notes, and references for mentions
Old Babylonian period (c. 1787 – c. 1475 BC)
First dynasty of Babylon (c. 1787 – c. 1732 BC)
		Hammurabi 𒄩𒄠𒈬𒊏𒁉	r. c. 1787 – c. 1750 BC (MC)	b. c. 1810 BC; Held the title of, "King of the Four Corners"; d. c. 1750 BC
		Samsu-iluna 𒊓𒄠𒋢𒄿𒇻𒈾	r. c. 1750 – c. 1732 BC (MC)	Son of Hammurabi; temp. of Siwe-Palar-Khuppak; d. c. 1712 BC
#	Portrait or inscription	Ruler	Approx. date and length of reign	Comments, notes, and references for mentions
First Sealand dynasty / Sealand I (c. 1732 – c. 1475 BC)
		Iliman	r. c. 1732 – c. 1700 BC (MC) r. c. 1700 BC (SC) (60 years)	Relative of Damiq-ilishu (?); temp. of Gandash
		Ittili	r. c. 1700 – c. 1683 BC (MC) (56 years)	temp. of Abi-Eshuh
		Unknown	r. c. 1683 – c. 1677 BC (MC)	temp. of Agum I
		Damqi-ilishu II 𒁕𒈪𒅅𒉌𒉌𒋗	r. c. 1677 – c. 1642 BC (MC) (26 years)	temp. of Ammi-Ditana
		Ishkibal	r. c. 1641 – c. 1617 BC (MC) (15 years)	temp. of Sharma-Adad I
		Shushushi	r. c. 1616 BC (MC) (24 years)	Brother of Ishkibal.; temp. of Ammi-Saduqa
		Gulkishar	Uncertain (MC) (55 years)	temp. of Samsu-Ditana
		Gishen	Uncertain (MC)	temp. of Sharma-Adad II
		Peshgaldaramesh	r. c. 1599 – c. 1549 BC (MC) (50 years)	Brother of Gulkishar; temp. of Shamshi-Adad III
		Ayadaragalama 𒀀𒀀𒁰𒃴𒈠	r. c. 1548 – c. 1520 BC (MC) (28 years)	Brother of Peshgaldaramesh; temp. of Ashur-nirari I; Held the title of, "King of the Universe"
		Ekurul	r. c. 1519 – c. 1493 BC (MC) (26 years)	temp. of Puzur-Ashur III
		Melamma	r. c. 1492 – c. 1485 BC (MC) (7 years)	temp. of Enlil-nasir I
		Eaga	r. c. 1484 – c. 1475 BC (MC) r. c. 1460 BC (SC) (9 years)	temp. of Ulamburiash
#	Portrait or inscription	Ruler	Approx. date and length of reign	Comments, notes, and references for mentions
Middle Babylonian period (c. 1475 – c. 1000 BC)
Kassite dynasty (c. 1475 – c. 1155 BC)
		Agum III	r. c. 1475 BC (MC)	Son of Kashtiliash III
		Kadashman-Sah	r. c. 1470 BC (MC)	
		Karaindash	r. c. 1415 BC (MC)	Held the title of, "King of Sumer and Akkad"
		Kadashman-Harbe I	r. c. 1410 BC (MC)	Son of Karaindash
		Kurigalzu I	r. c. 1400 BC (MC)	Son of Kadashman-harbe I
		Kadashman-Enlil I 𒅗𒁕𒀸𒈠𒀭𒀭𒂗𒆤	r. c. 1374 – c. 1360 BC (MC) (14 years)	Son of Kurigalzu I (?)
		Burna-Buriash II 𒁓𒈾𒁍𒊑𒅀𒀸	r. c. 1360 – c. 1333 BC (MC) (27 years)	Son of Kadashman-Enlil I; Held the title of, "King of Sumer and Akkad"
		Kara-hardash	r. c. 1333 BC (MC)	Son of Burna-Buriash II (?)
		Nazi-Bugash	r. c. 1333 BC (MC)	
		Kurigalzu II	r. c. 1333 – c. 1308 BC (MC) (25 years)	Son of Burna-Buriash II; Held the title of, "King of Sumer and Akkad"
		Nazi-Maruttash	r. c. 1308 – c. 1282 BC (MC) (26 years)	Son of Kurigalzu II; Held the title of, "King of Sumer and Akkad"
		Kadashman-Turgu	r. c. 1282 – c. 1264 BC (MC) (18 years)	Son of Nazi-Maruttash
		Kadashman-Enlil II	r. c. 1264 – c. 1255 BC (MC) (9 years)	Son of Kadashman-Turgu
		Kudur-Enlil	r. c. 1255 – c. 1246 BC (MC) (9 years)	Son of Kadashman-Enlil II
		Shagarakti-Shuriash	r. c. 1246 – c. 1233 BC (MC) (13 years)	Son of Kudur-Enlil
		Kashtiliash IV	r. c. 1233 – c. 1225 BC (MC) (8 years)	Son of Shagarakti-Shuriash
		Enlil-nadin-shumi	r. c. 1224 BC (MC) (1 year and 6 months)	
		Kadashman-Harbe II	r. c. 1223 BC (MC) (1 year and 6 months)	
		Adad-shuma-iddina	r. c. 1223 – c. 1217 BC (MC) (6 years)	
		Adad-shuma-usur	r. c. 1217 – c. 1187 BC (MC) (30 years)	Son of Kashtiliash IV (?)
		Meli-Shipak II	r. c. 1187 – c. 1172 BC (MC) (15 years)	Son of Adad-shuma-usur
		Marduk-apla-iddina I	r. c. 1172 – c. 1159 BC (MC) (13 years)	Son of Meli-Shipak II
		Zababa-shuma-iddin	r. c. 1159 – c. 1158 BC (MC) (1 year)	
		Enlil-nadin-ahi	r. c. 1158 – c. 1155 BC (MC) (3 years)	
#	Portrait or inscription	Ruler	Approx. date and length of reign	Comments, notes, and references for mentions
Second dynasty of Isin / Isin II dynasty (c. 1153 – c. 1022 BC)
		Marduk-kabit-ahheshu	r. c. 1153 – c. 1135 BC (18 years)	temp. of Ashur-dan I
		Itti-Marduk-balatu	r. c. 1135 – c. 1129 BC (MC) (6 years)	Son of Marduk-kabit-ahheshu; temp. of Ninurta-tukulti-Ashur
		Ninurta-nadin-shumi	r. c. 1129 – c. 1122 BC (MC) (7 years)	Relative of Itti-Marduk-balatu (?); temp. of Ashur-resh-ishi I
		Nebuchadnezzar I	r. c. 1122 – c. 1100 BC (MC) (22 years)	Son of Ninurta-nadin-shumi; temp. of Tiglath-Pileser I
		Enlil-nadin-apli	r. c. 1100 – c. 1096 BC (MC) (4 years)	Son of Nebuchadnezzar I
		Marduk-nadin-ahhe	r. c. 1096 – c. 1078 BC (MC) (18 years)	Son of Ninurta-nadin-shumi
		Marduk-shapik-zeri	r. c. 1078 – c. 1065 BC (MC) (13 years)	Son of Marduk-nadin-ahhe; temp. of Asharid-apal-Ekur
		Adad-apla-iddina	r. c. 1065 – c. 1041 BC (MC) (24 years)	temp. of Ashur-bel-kala
		Marduk-ahhe-eriba	r. c. 1041 BC (MC) (6 months)	temp. of Ashurnasirpal I
		Marduk-zer-X	r. c. 1041 – c. 1029 BC (MC) (12 years)	
		Nabu-shum-libur	r. c. 1029 – c. 1022 BC (MC) (7 years)	temp. of Shalmaneser II

== See also ==
- Cities of the Ancient Near East
- List of Mesopotamian dynasties
