= Marduk-zer-X =

- King of Babylon
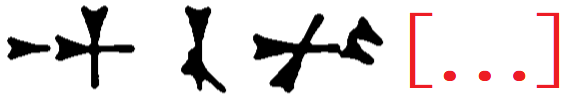
- Name in Akkadian
- Reign: c. 1041–1030 BC (Note: Previous scholarship assumed that Marduk-kabit-ahheshu, the founder of the second dynasty of Isin, ruled for the first years of his reign concurrently with the last Kassite king, but per Beaulieu (2018), more recent research suggests that this was not the case, necessitating a revised chronology of the kings after Marduk-kabit-ahheshu. Marduk-zer-X has previously been dated to about 1046–1033 BC, with 1041–1030 BC being Beaulieu's revised dates.)
- Predecessor: Marduk-aḫḫē-erība
- Successor: Nabû-šuma-libūr
- House: 2nd Dynasty of Isin

Marduk-zer-X (ruled c. 1041–1030 BC) was the 10th and penultimate king of the 2nd Dynasty of Isin, the 4th Dynasty of Babylon. The last part of his name is unknown, as the principal sources of information, the King List A (Note: King List A, BM 33332,) and the Synchronistic King List (Note: Synchronistic King List A.117, Assur 14646c,) are both damaged at this place in the sequence, hence the “x”. The reading of “zer” in his name by Poebel is almost as uncertain, as the character may be MU which would correspond to šuma or similar. His Assyrian contemporary was Aššur-nasir-apli I.

== Biography ==
He ruled twelve years according to the King List A. At present, there are no inscriptions that have been identified as contemporaneous with his reign and it is only his appearance on the king lists which identify him.

There has been some speculation by Hallo, Younger, and others that the Prophecy A text (Note: Prophecy A, tablet VAT 10179, KAR 421.) refers to the kings of this dynasty with King III corresponding to Marduk-nādin-aḫḫē, and King IV to Marduk-šāpik-zēri due to the coincidences of their length of reigns. For subsequent kings, the "prophecies" offer poor correlation with their reigns and known events. In this scheme, Marduk-zer-X is represented by King VI, whose text is very broken up but the rivers are said to have filled with silt. This reconstruction depends on the identification of Adad-apla-iddina as a usurper, a position undermined by the discovery of the Walker Chronicle.

He was succeeded by Nabû-šuma-libūr, whose relationship to him is uncertain.
