= Opis =

Iraqi archaeological site

- Location within Iraq
- Type: Settlement
- Location: Baghdad Governorate, Iraq
- Region: Mesopotamia

Opis (Akkadian Upî or Upija/Upiya; Ancient Greek: Ὦπις) was an ancient Near East city near the Tigris, not far from modern Baghdad. The equivalence of Opis and Upi are now usually assumed but not yet proven. Early on it was thought that the ideogram for Upi might refer to Kesh or Akshak. Its location is not yet known with certainty though Tall al-Mujailāt has been proposed. That site has also been suggested as the location of the ancient city of Akshak.

== Location ==
Akkadian and Greek texts indicate that it was located on the east side of the Tigris, near the Diyala River. The precise site of the city has been uncertain for a long time, though at one point thought to be near or under the city of Seleucia. The site of Tel Abir was also proposed as the location of Opis.

Several texts suggest that Upi is in the same area as the city of Akkad, also unlocated, and in the area between Sippar and Eshnunna.

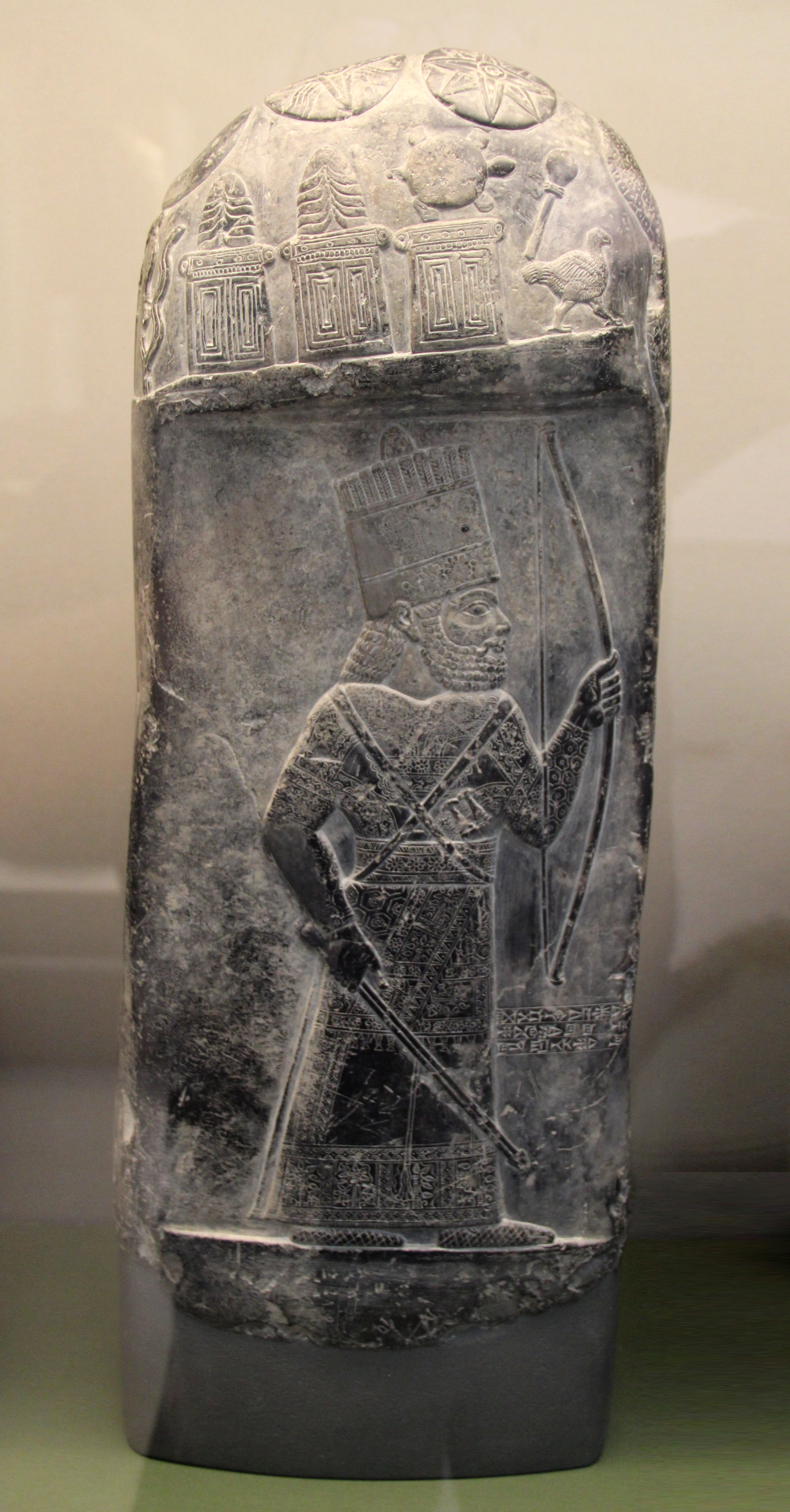
A similar Kudurru of Marduk-nadin-akhe

Recent geographical surveys of ancient Mesopotamia tentatively identify Opis with the mound called Tall al-Mujailāt (also Tulūl al-Mujaili` or Tulūl Mujaili` or el-Mjel'aat), 20 miles southeast of the modern city of Baghdad, 15 kilometers north of ancient Ctesiphon, and 47 miles northeast of ancient Babylon. The site has an extent of 500 meters by 200 meters with a maximum height of 6.5 meters above the plain. Surface material showed occupation from the Early Dynastic through the Neo-Babylonian periods.

A Kudurru dated to the 13th year of Second Dynasty of Isin ruler Marduk-nadin-ahhe (c. 1095–1078 BC) was found at Tulūl al-Mujaili`. It was recorded at "the city Opis". The land in question was part of the city of Dur-Sharrkin "Fortress of Sargon" (location unknown). Not to be confused with the much later Neo-Assyrian fortress.

== History ==
A text from year 8 of Ur III ruler Shu-Sin (c. 2037–2028 BC) details a journey of 22 women from Eshnunna to Nippur and back via Upi with the Upi/Nippur leg in both directions being fully on water.

A year name of the Old Babylonian ruler Apil-Sin (c. 1767 to 1749 BC) read "Year Apil-Sin built (the city wall of) Upi" (mu u2-pi2-e^{ki} a-pil-^{d}en.zu ba-du3).

Early in the reign of Old Babylonian Empire ruler Hamurabi, grandson of Apil-Sin, a conflict between Babylon, Mari, Eshnunna, and Elam resulted in Hamurabi being in control of the Upi area. A text from Mari showed diplomacy over that area's disposition:

"If he releases Mankisum, Upi, Shahadunu, and the banks of the Tigris River three double-miles south of Upi — which is the border my grandfather Apil-Sin fixed - then, I will make peace with him. Otherwise, if I am to release Mankisum, he should repay me (for) my efforts that I expended against the Sukkal of Elam for Mankisum. (Only) then may he take Mankisum and I (will take) Upi, Shahadunu and three double-miles south of Upi (along) the banks of the Tigris River."

From a text, it is known that the Kassite ruler Burna-Buriash II (c. 1359–1333 BC) held an audience in Upi.

A Kudurru from the reign of Adad-apla-iddina (c. 1064–1043) excavated at Assur is dated at Opis.

In one of the annals of Neo-Assyrian ruler Sennacherib (705–681 BC) it states:

"… I gave orders to sailors of the cities of Tyre (and) Sidon, (and) the land Ionia, whom I had captured. They (my troops) let (the sailors) sail down the Tigris river with them, downstream to the city of Opis. Then from the city of Opis, they lifted them (the boats) up onto dry land and dragged them on rollers to Sippar? and guided them into the Arahtu canal …"

Ancient Near East 540 BC

The Neo-Babylonians dug the Nār-Šarri (later Nār-Nabû-kudurrī-uṣur) canal between the Euphrates and the Tigris, which ended near Opis. The Neo-Babylonian king Nebuchadnezzar II (605–562 BC) built a long wall between the two rivers to protect against a potential Median invasion; the fortified line began at Sippar and continued eastward beyond the Tigris and ended near Opis. In Nebuchadnezzar II year 40, 565 BC, a cuneiform document was written in Opis by a Judean trader, the first attestation of a Judean trader in Babylonia.

In October 539 BC, the troops of the Babylonian king Nabonidus (556–539 BC) defended Opis against the Persians commanded by Cyrus the Great (559–530 BC). The Babylonians were defeated and the native population revolted against its government. Without further fighting, Cyrus captured Babylon. Opis was located near the Persian Royal Road, which connected the former Elamite capital Susa to the Assyrian heartland around Erbil and, further to the west, the Lydian capital Sardis. It is known that at the time of Nabonidus the city had a Šangû-Upia (“High-Priest-of-Opis”).

In September 331 BC, the Macedonian king Alexander the Great (336–323 BC) defeated Darius III of Persia (336–330 BC) at the Battle of Gaugamela, and probably took possession of Opis about the same time as Babylon. A few years later, Alexander was forced by a mutiny at the Hyphasis (now Beas) River to return from the long campaign in India, and his European troops revolted again at Opis (autumn 324 BC). In an attempt to craft a lasting harmony between his Macedonian and Persian subjects, he took an oath of unity before 9,000 Persian and Greek troops at Opis. In a similar vein, he had married Stateira (the daughter of Darius) and celebrated a mass marriage of his senior officers to Persian and other Eastern noblewomen at Susa just before coming to Opis.

Seleukos I Nikator (306–281 BC), one of Alexander's Diadochi (Successors), founded the Seleucid Empire and built his Mesopotamian capital Seleukeia west of the river Tigris, some 12 miles (19 km) southwest of Opis. The Hellenistic city of Seleukeia rapidly eclipsed older Mesopotamian centers in the region like Babylon, Sippar, and Opis.

In the 2nd century BC, the Parthian Empire conquered the eastern provinces of the Seleucid Empire, including Seleukeia and Opis. Both cities were, in their turn, largely eclipsed by the emergence of the new Parthian (and subsequently Persian) capital Ktesiphon nearby, in-between Seleukeia and Opis.

== See also ==
- Cities of the ancient Near East
