= Asharid-apal-Ekur =

- King of Assyria

King of the Middle Assyrian Empire
- Reign: 1076–1074 BC
- Predecessor: Tiglath-Pileser I
- Successor: Ashur-bel-kala
- Father: Tiglath-Pileser I

Ašarēd-apil-Ekur, inscribed ^{m}a-šá-rid-A-É.KUR (Note: Khorsabad Kinglist: iii 41.) or ^{m}SAG.KAL-DUMU.UŠ-É.KUR (Note: SDAS Kinglist iii 27.) and variants (Note: Nassouhi Kinglist iv 8: [^{m}S]AG-A-É.KUR.) (meaning "the heir of the Ekur is foremost"), was the son and successor of Tukultī-apil-Ešarra I as king of the Middle Assyrian Empire, reigning for just two years, 1076/5–1074 BC, during the turmoil that engulfed the end of that lengthy reign, and he was the 88th king to appear on the Assyrian King List. His reign marked the elevation of the office of ummânu (royal scholar), and he was the first to have this recorded next to the king’s name on the Synchronistic King List, (Note: Synchronistic King List, KAV 216 (ass. 14616c), ii 18.) possibly identifying the contemporary redactor of this list.

== Biography ==
According to an early reading of the Synchronistic King List, he was a contemporary of the Babylonian king Itti-Marduk-balāṭu, c. 1140–1132 BC, where this monarch had perhaps been relocated to follow Marduk-nādin-aḫḫē, c. 1099-1082 BC. This part of the cuneiform text is now lost or disproven. Current theories of chronological succession suggest Marduk-šāpik-zēri, c. 1082–1069 BC, may have been his Babylonian counterpart, with M. B. Rowton suggesting synchronizing the two-year reign of Ašarēd-apil-Ekur with this king's 5th and 6th years.

There are no royal inscriptions known from his reign, and he appears only in later king lists and in an eponym list. (Note: KAV 21 iii 13, as [... ]-A-É.KUR.) He was succeeded by his brother Aššur-bel-kala, then his nephew Eriba-Adad II, then his other brother Šamši-Adad IV.

== Inscriptions ==
Preceded by Tiglath-Pileser I	King of Assyria; 1076–1074 BC	Succeeded by Ashur-bel-kala
