= Simbar-shipak =

Simbar-Šipak
- King of Babylon
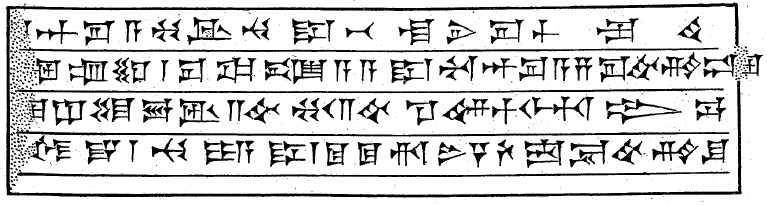
- Part of Simbar-Šihu kudurru inscription
- Reign: c. 1021–1004 BC
- Predecessor: Nabû-šuma-libūr; 2nd Dynasty of Isin
- Successor: Ea-mukin-zēri
- House: 2nd Sealand Dynasty

Simbar-Šipak, or perhaps Simbar-Šiḫu, (Note: Earlier readings render his name as Simmash-Shipak.) (typically inscribed ^{m}sim-bar-^{d}ši-i-ḪU or si-im-bar-ši-ḪU in cuneiform, where the reading of the last symbol is uncertain) was a Babylonian king who reigned c. 1021–1004 BC.

His name means the “offspring of (the Kassite moon god) Šipak”. He founded the 2nd Dynasty of the Sealand, Babylon’s 5th Dynasty. He conducted a program of restoration of a number of temples that had been destroyed earlier by the marauding Arameans and the Sutû. His identification with the Sibir (^{m}Si-bir) named by Ashurnasirpal II in his annals (Note: Annals of Ashurbanipal II, ii 84: ^{m}si-bir šar_{4} ^{kur}kar-du-ni-áš.) as having earlier captured and laid waste Atlila (probably modern Bakr Awa), a city on Assyria’s eastern flank, remains unresolved.

== Biography ==
Simbar-Šipak lived during turbulent times, where crop failures and almost constant conflicts with semi-nomadic migrants caused the Babylonian government of the preceding 2nd Dynasty of Isin to fall. As a soldier from the southern region of Mesopotamia, he emerged to stabilize the situation. He reigned for 18 years according to the King List A, (Note: King List A, BM 33332, iii 6, abbreviated to ^{m}ším-bar-ši.) 17 years according to the Dynastic Chronicle (Note: Dynastic chronicle (ABC 18) v 2-4.) which names him Simbar-Šiḫu, “knight of the Sealand,” (Note: rēdû ša māt tām-tim, “knight of the Sealand.”) son of Eriba-Sin, an individual otherwise unknown, and soldier of the dynasty of Damiq-ilišu, (Note: ERÍN (ṣābu) BALA SIG_{5}-DINGIR-šu, "the dynasty of Damiq-ilišu.") a possible reference to the ultimate king of the first dynasty of Isin, whom the founder of the first Sealand dynasty, Ilum-ma-ilī, had claimed filiation, or alternatively to Damqi-ilishu of the Sealand dynasty. Despite the apparent Kassite character of his name, there is no other evidence of this tribal affiliation. Although there are no traces of his name remaining on the Assyrian Synchronistic King List, (Note: Synchronistic King List, Assur 14616c, iii 1–2 (restored).) the king would have appeared, somewhat implausibly, in the section belonging opposite Erība-Adad II.

Only four contemporary written documents from his reign are known. One comprises two late copies of a royal inscription, known as “Enlil’s throne” or the “Royal inscription of Simbar-Šipak”, another a legal deed drawn up in the king's twelfth year, a third an inscribed dagger in the Archaeological Museum of Tabriz, Iran, apparently found in a river in the eastern Azerbaijan province, and the fourth an arrowhead (Note: Bronze Arrow Head, 2 9/16 in. (6.5 cm.) high, Christie’s, New York, 7 December 2011, lot 13, sale 2490.) inscribed "(Property) of Simbar-Šiḫu, son of Eriba-Sin," thus confirming the name of his father given in two late chronicles. The deed details the sale of land in compensation for ransom paid by an intermediary and redemption of the former landowner’s three sons, and the inscription on the bottom edge (pictured) reads:

Ea-mukîn-zêri, the son of Belani, the priest of Eridu, and the scribe Esagilâa, the son of Arad-Ea, who holds the tablet, are present. The city of Saḫritu, in the Second Elul, in the twelfth year of Simbar-Šipak, king of Babylon. The nail of Zêria, the son of Kudurri, the tax-collector, to represent his seal.”

— Simbar-Šihu kudurru, Bottom edge lines 1–4. (Note: Stone tablet BM 90937 (British Museum).)

It would be tempting to identify the first witness with his nemesis and successor, Ea-mukin-zēri but this would be speculative.

=== Royal Inscription of Simbar-Šipak ===
This is extant on two copies of an inscription of the king recording the rededication of the throne of the god Enlil in the E-kur-igigal temple at Nippur following the judicious return of the “goods and property of Ellil” by an Assyrian (king) who had recovered them from the Arameans, the original thieves. It states that it is Marduk that sits at the throne where Enlil and Marduk are apparently treated as the same god. The Eclectic Chronicle describes the same event. (Note: Eclectic Chronicle (ABC 24) BM 27859 obverse, lines 12-13.) The inscription goes on to describe the travails inflicted by the Arameans and Sutû, harking back to the reign of Adad-apla-iddina:

(Concerning) the throne of the god Ellil in the (temple) E-kur-igigal, which Nabû-kudurrī-uṣur a former king, had fashioned: During the reign of Adad-apla-iddina, king of Babylon, hostile Aramaeans and Suteans, enemies of the E-kur (temple) and (the city) of Nippur, they who laid hands on Duranki (Nippur), (who) upset in Sippar, the pristine town, the seat of the high-judge of the gods, their rites, (who) sacked the land of Sumer and Akkad, and overthrew all the temples. The goods (and) property of the god Enlil which the Arameans had carried off and (which) Subartu (Assyria) had appropriated, …. Simbar-Šipak, viceroy of the god Enlil, favorite of… reverent shepherd…was exceedingly concerned about the renovation of the temple E-kur and the city of Nippur. He had a throne … constructed and set up, suitable for Enlil’s august position as supreme god. On account of this, when … Enlil … sits upon this throne, may the fate of Simbar-Šipak … be established favorably.

— Inscription of Simbar-Šipak, Late Babylonian copy (Note: Neo-Babylonian Clay Cuneiform Tablet, Edgar J. Banks Collection, Spurlock Museum, University of Illinois at Urbana Champaign, Museum reference WHM 13.14.1729 (formerly UIOM 2499) and British Museum duplicate BM 82953 (83-1-21,116).)

In his dedication to Enlil, he describes himself as, “he who puts in order the paths of Anum and Dagan, he who preserves their rites.” (Note: muštēšir alkakāti Anim u Dagan mušallimu mēsīšunu.)

=== Other sources ===
The Sun God Tablet of Nabu-apla-iddina (Note: The Sun God Tablet, BM 91000 i 13-23.) relates that “during the troubles and disorders in Akkad”, the Sutû, the “evil foe”, had overthrown the cult idol of Šamaš in Sippar. Simbar-Šipak, had sought to recover it but had been unsuccessful due to lack of divine support – so he suspended a sun disc (“nipḫu”) as a substitute idol, established regular offerings, and installed Ekur-šum-ušabši, the seer and priest of Sippar, at the temple.

The Religious Chronicle is thought to record events of his reign, based on the order of preceding kings, and provides some fairly obscure portents such as “a wolf was lurking in the west,” “a badger in the Uraš gate at the door of the šatammu's (temple administrator’s) residence,” “two deer entered Babylon,” and most ominously “on the twenty-sixth of the month Simanu, in the seventh year, day turned to night and there was a fire in the sky,” an eclipse, speculated to have taken place on 9 May 1012 B.C. Things seemed to have taken a turn for the worse from the thirteenth year onward as the chariot of Bel did not come out for three successive years and the eighteenth year was marked by a wave of water coming down from the Ištar gate, entering Babylon, two soldiers were killed and an idol was knocked off its pedestal. (Note: Religious Chronicle (ABC 17) tablet BM 35968, ii 1–25.) This was the year his reign came to a dramatic end when he was assassinated, quite possibly by his successor, Ea-mukin-zēri, “by the sword,” (Note: GIŠ.TUKUL.TA BA.AN.SÌG.GI.IN, “by the sword.”) plunging the country once again into chaos. He “was buried in the palace of Sargon.”
