= Kadašman-Buriaš =

Kadašman-Buriaš, meaning “my trust is in the (Kassite storm-god) Buriaš,” was the governor of the Babylonian province of Dūr-Kurigalzu possibly late in the reign of Marduk-šāpik-zēri, who ruled ca. 1082–1069 BC. He was reportedly captured and deported during a campaign conducted by the Assyrian king Aššur-bel-kala during 1070 B.C.

== Biography ==
Although he bore a Kassite name, which features on a Kassite-Babylonian name list, his father was Itti-Marduk-balāṭu, inscribed KI-˹^{d}AMAR˺.[UTU]-˹TI˺.LA, an individual with a rather common Babylonian moniker. The only current extant source attesting to him is the “Broken Obelisk,” which is usually attributed to Aššur-bel-kala, which describes his campaign during the eponym year of Aššur-rā’im-nišēšu, thought to be in his fourth year. It recalls: “In the same year (ina šattimma šiāti), in the month Šebat, the chariots and … went from Inner City (of Assur) and conquered the cities …-indišulu and …-sandu, cities which are in the district Dūr-Kurigalzu.”

Adad-apla-iddina, as the king who was subsequently installed by Aššur-bel-kala, also has his father given as Itti-Marduk-balāṭu in the Eclectic Chronicle, leaving the intriguing possibility that he was a brother of the former governor. Some of the late 19th and early 20th century scholarly works erroneously give Kadašman-Buriaš as the name of the Kassite king Kadašman-Enlil II.
