= Marduk-ahhe-eriba =

Marduk-aḫḫe-eriba
- King of Babylon
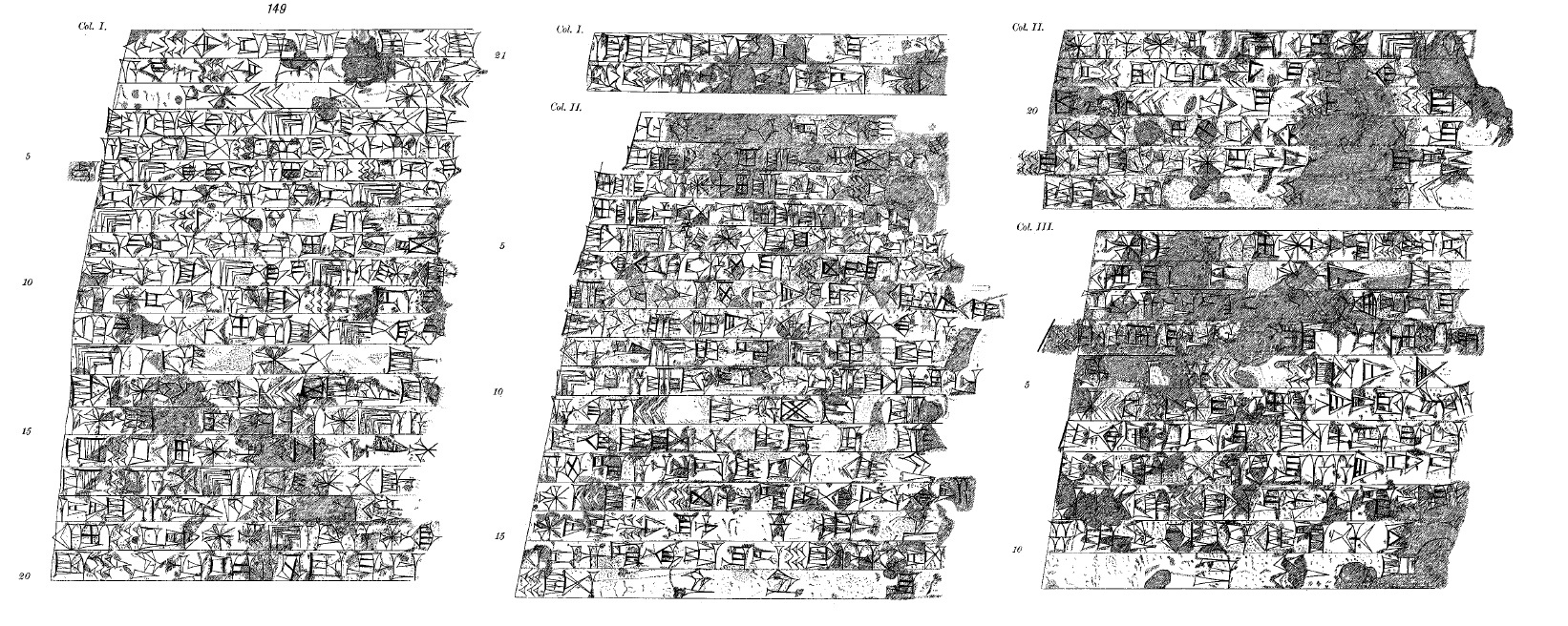
- Hilprecht’s line art for the Marduk-aḫḫē-erība kudurru (Note: Kudurru BE I 2 149.)
- Reign: c. 1042 BC (Note: Previous scholarship assumed that Marduk-kabit-ahheshu, the founder of the second dynasty of Isin, ruled for the first years of his reign concurrently with the last Kassite king, but per Beaulieu (2018), more recent research suggests that this was not the case, necessitating a revised chronology of the kings after Marduk-kabit-ahheshu. Marduk-ahhe-eriba has previously been dated to about 1046 BC, with 1042 BC being Beaulieu's revised date.)
- Predecessor: Adad-apla-iddina
- Successor: Marduk-zer-X
- House: 2nd Dynasty of Isin

Marduk-aḫḫē-erība, inscribed in cuneiform contemporarily as ^{md}AMAR.UTU-ŠEŠ-MEŠ-SU, meaning: “Marduk has replaced the brothers for me,” a designation given to younger sons whose older siblings have typically predeceased them, ruled c. 1042 BC as the 9th king of the 2nd Dynasty of Isin and the 4th Dynasty of Babylon, but only for around 6 months using the date formula: MU 1 ITI 6, which first appears in Kassite times and is open to interpretation. (Note: The Kinglist A, tablet BM 33332, iii 2 which gives the beginning of his name as: ^{md}ŠÚ-ŠEŠ-) According to the Synchronistic Kinglist (Note: Synchronistic Kings List A.117, excavation reference Assur 14616c, ii 22.) he was a contemporary of the Assyrian king Aššur-bêl-kala where only the beginning of his name appears below that of his immediate predecessor Adad-apla-iddina.

== Biography ==
The only contemporary source is a kudurru (line art pictured), or gray limestone boundary marker, in a private collection in Istanbul, which records a land grant to a certain Kudurrâ, a “Ḫabiru” and servant of the king, in a region of northern Babylonia called Bīt-Piri’-Amurru. The term Ḫabiru may be a socio-economic designation rather than an indication of "Hebrew" ethnicity, since the name Kudurrâ is possibly not linguistically of semitic derivation. The field was surveyed (Note: Termed rēš eqli našû, to lift the head of the field.) by a diviner, a scribe named Nabû-ēriš the son of (i.e. descendant of) Arad-Ea, an administrator and a mayor.

It has been suggested that he is the 5th king represented in the Prophecy A (Note: Prophecy A, tablet VAT 10179 (KAR 421) obverse ii 19.) by the single line, “A prince will arise, and his days will be short. He will not rule in the land.” This is a late Assyrian tablet found at Assur and first published in 1923, which narrates a sequence of 12 Babylonian kings.

== See also ==
- Habiru
