= Nabu-shum-libur =

Nabû-šuma-libūr
- King of Babylon
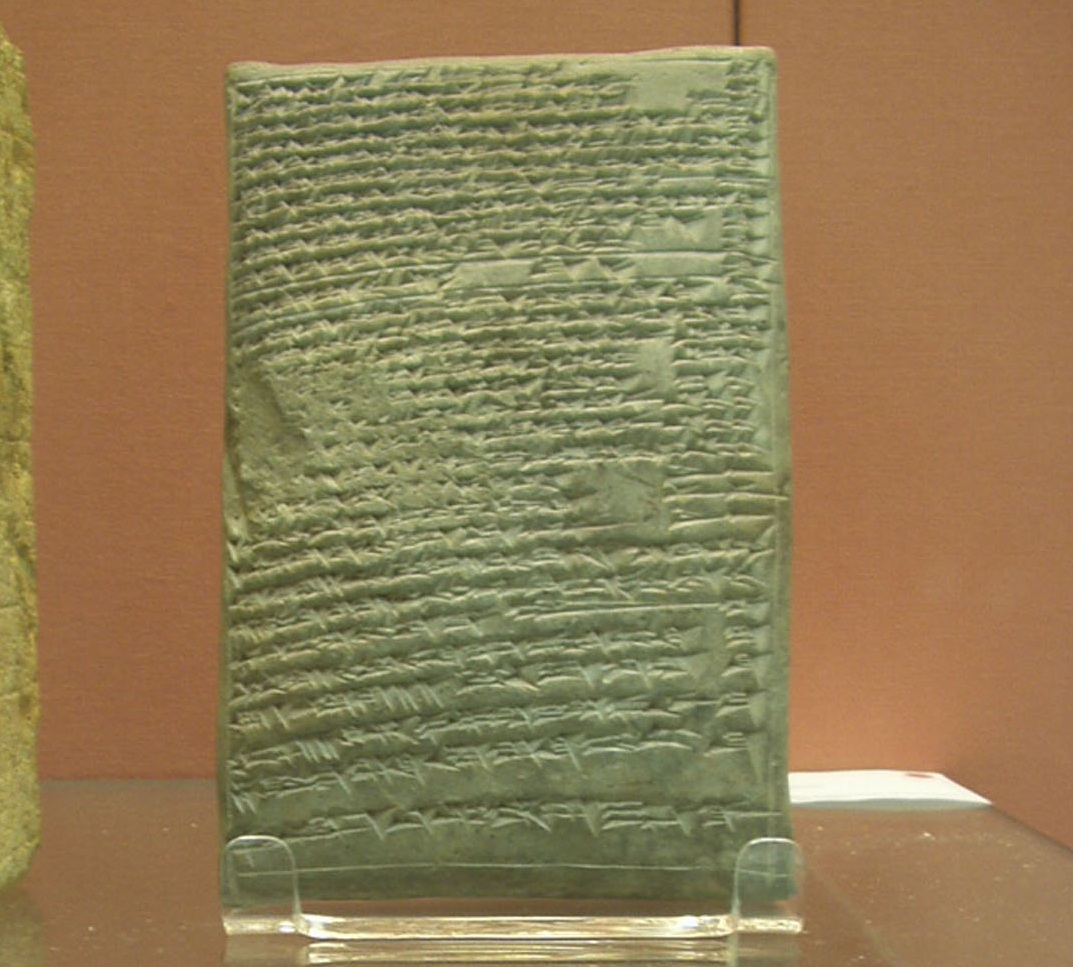
- Contract of a sale of land imposed by the need to pay a ransom, dated to his 1st year.
- Reign: c. 1029–1022 BC (Note: Previous scholarship assumed that Marduk-kabit-ahheshu, the founder of the second dynasty of Isin, ruled for the first years of his reign concurrently with the last Kassite king, but per Beaulieu (2018), more recent research suggests that this was not the case, necessitating a revised chronology of the kings after Marduk-kabit-ahheshu. Nabu-shum-libur has previously been dated to about 1033–1026 BC, with 1029–1022 BC being Beaulieu's revised dates.)
- Predecessor: Marduk-zer-X
- Successor: Simbar-Šipak (Dynasty V)
- House: 2nd Dynasty of Isin

Nabû-šumu-libūr, inscribed ^{d}AG.MU-li-bur (Note: Tablet BM 33332 Kinglist A, iii 4'.) or ^{d}na-bi-um-MU-li-bur, (Note: Tablet BM 139424, purchased in 1982 and on display in room 55 of the British Museum.) meaning "O Nabû, may (my) progeny / the son stay in good health," (ruled c. 1029–1022 BC) was the 11th and last king of the 2nd Dynasty of Isin, the 4th Dynasty of Babylon. He ruled during a period of instability due to incursions of Aramean nomadic tribesmen in Northwest Babylonia.

== Biography ==
There is very little extant material for his reign. The legal text pictured is from his first year. It was found at Kār-Bēlet-Ilāni near Nippur, and details the reimbursement of Nusku-zêra-iddina, the šandabakku, or governor of Nippur, with land, after he ransomed a man named Mudammiqu from the 'enemy'. (Note: The enemy is recorded as LÚ.KÚR.MEŠ, and is unspecific.) The price was paid in kind, with the text listing various items provided by the purchaser with their cash equivalent, for a total of 420 shekels. It was first published in 1983 and the text provides the earliest recorded price for iron, (Note: AN.BAR, iron.) where an iron dagger of unspecified weight was valued at two shekels of silver. It was witnessed by eleven individuals representing the roll call for the elite in Nippur and the god Ninurta is invoked as patron deity of boundaries.

A stone duck weight (Note: Alabaster duck-weight with two panels of cuneiform inscription; top of bird's head lost; abraded, BM 91432.) inscribed Nabû-šuma-libūr, optimistically titled šar kiššati (king of the world), (Note: Transliterated: 30 ma- <na> gi-na [ ] sa ^{d}AG.MU-li-bur LUGAL DIN.[ ], translated: "30 mina, correct, of Nabû-šuma-libūr, king of the world.") found its way to the Northwest palace of Nimrud, where it was preserved as an antique and rediscovered by Layard in the mid 19th century, and perhaps indicates continued trade. It was marked 30 minas (about 15 kilograms).

Ominous portents dated for his reign, are included in a damaged Religious Chronicle of the Seleucid era. (Note: The Religious Chronicle, tablet BM 35968 (ABC 17) column 1.) It records, "a lion was lying lurking and they killed it," a prophecy fulfilled by the fall of the dynasty. The events at the end of his reign are not known, but northern Babylonia had been overrun by Aramean tribesmen from the west, and the dynasty was followed by the 2nd Dynasty of Sealand when a substantial part of southern Mesopotamia seceded.
