= Ea-mukin-zeri =

Ea-mukin-zēri
- King of Babylon
- Reign: c. 1004 BC
- Predecessor: Simbar-šipak
- Successor: Kaššu-nādin-aḫi
- House: 2nd Sealand Dynasty

Ea-mukin-zēri, inscribed ^{md}É-a-mu-kin-NUMUN, son of Hašmar (Note: Dynastic Chronicle v 5-6: ^{md}É-a-mu-kin-NUMUN LUGAL IM.GI DUMU ^{m}Ḫaš-mar iti 3 in.ak, ina raq-qa-ti šá É-^{m}Ḫaš-mar qí-bir.) (DUMU, “son of,” ḫaš-mar, a Kassite word for “(the) falcon”), was the 2nd king of the 2nd Sealand or 5th Dynasty of Babylon, c. 1004 BC, but only for 3 months, according to the Dynastic Chronicle, 5 months according to the Kinglist A. (Note: Babylonian King List A, tablet BM 33332, iii 7: as ^{md}Ea(be)-mu-kin.)

== Biography ==
His predecessor was Simbar-šipak, who ruled c. 1021–1004 BC, and the Dynastic Chronicle records that he “was slain with the sword,” before describing Ea-mukin-zēri as “the usurper (LUGAL IM.GI).” Another person named Ea-mukin-zēri appears as a witness to a land deed (Note: Stone tablet, BM 90937, BBSt. No. 27, bottom edge.) dated to Simbar-šipak’s twelfth year, but is probably someone else as it records that he was the son of Belani and was the priest of Eridu. The Synchronistic King List (Note: Synchronistic King List iii 3: as ^{md}Ea-(diš)-[…].) makes him a contemporary of Šamši-Adad IV of Assyria but possibly for stylistic purposes as he was likely to have been one of the many Babylonian Kings who were contemporary with the later Assyrian King Aššur-rabi II’s lengthy reign.

The Dynastic Chronicle notes that “he was buried in the swamp of Bit-Hašmar,” presumably an ancestral homeland and possibly Darband-i-Ḫān, where the Diyala breaks through the Bazian range, at the northeast boundary of Namri according to Levine or southern Babylonia according to Brinkman, perhaps even Bīt-Ḫaššamur, a town in the vicinity of Nippur according to Beaulieu. The practice of interring Mesopotamian kings in wetlands, “close to the abode of Enki,” was a common practice and commented upon by ancient historians such as Strabo and Arrian in his Anabasis Alexandri, quoting Aristobulus of Cassandreia’s History of Alexander the Great. This describes his inspection of the royal tombs, which were at least partially submerged and surrounded by reeds. Burial in swamps "in the reeds of Enki" (gi-^{d}en-ki-ka-ka) were also recorded by Urukinimgina, énsi of Lagash (c. 2380 BC–2360 BC short chronology), in his reforms.
