= Shamshi-Adad IV =

- King of Assyria

King of the Middle Assyrian Empire
- Reign: 1054–1050 BC
- Predecessor: Eriba-Adad II
- Successor: Ashurnasirpal I
- Issue: Ashurnasirpal I
- Father: Tiglath-Pileser I

Shamshi-Adad IV, inscribed ^{md}šam-ši-^{d}IM, was the king of Assyria, 1054/3–1050 BC, the 91st to be listed on the Assyrian Kinglist. (Note: Khorsabad Kinglist, tablet IM 60017 (excavation nos.: DS 828, DS 32-54), iv 1–4.) (Note: SDAS Kinglist, tablet IM 60484, iii 33–36.) He was a son of Tiglath-Pileser I (1114–1076 BC), the third to have taken the throne, after his brothers Asharid-apal-Ekur and Ashur-bel-kala, and he usurped the kingship from the latter’s son, the short-reigning Eriba-Adad II (1055–1054 BC). It is quite probable that he was fairly elderly when he seized the throne.

== Biography ==
The Assyrian kinglist recalls that he "came up from Karduniaš (i.e. Babylonia). He ousted Eriba-Adad, son of Aššur-bêl-kala, seized the throne and ruled for 4 years". The king of Babylon was Adad-apla-iddina, who had been installed more than a decade earlier by Shamshi-Adad brother, Ashur-bel-kala. The extent to which he was instrumental in the succession is uncertain but it seems that Shamshi-Adad may have earlier sought refuge in exile in the south.

The Synchronistic Kinglist (Note: Synchronistic Kinglist, Ass 14616c (KAV 216), iii 3.) gives Ea-, presumed to be Ea-mukin-zeri (c. 1008 BC), as his Babylonian contemporary, an unlikely pairing as he was likely to have been concurrent with the latter kings of the 2nd dynasty of Isin during its dying throes. The political events of his reign are obscure and his fragmentary inscriptions are limited to commemorating renovation work carried out on the Ištar temple at Nineveh and the bīt nāmeru ("gate-tower") at Assur.

He would be succeeded by his son, Ashurnasirpal I.

== Inscriptions ==
Preceded by Eriba-Adad II	King of Assyria; 1054–1050 BC	Succeeded by Ashurnasirpal I
