= Ashur-bel-kala =

11th-century BC Assyrian king

- King of Assyria; King of the Four Corners of the World

King of the Middle Assyrian Empire
- Reign: 1074–1056 BC
- Predecessor: Asharid-apal-Ekur
- Successor: Eriba-Adad II
- Spouse: Babylonian princess, daughter of Adad-apla-iddina
- Father: Tiglath-Pileser I

Aššūr-bēl-kala, inscribed ^{m}aš-šur-EN-ka-la (meaning "Aššur is lord of all"), was the king of Assyria in 1074/3–1056 BC, the 89th to appear on the Assyrian Kinglist. He was the son of Tiglath-Pileser I, succeeded his brother Asharid-apal-Ekur who had briefly preceded him, and he ruled for 18 years (Note: Assyrian Kinglist, iii 29-30, 31, 35.) He was the last king of the Middle Assyrian Empire, and his later reign was preoccupied with a revolution against his rule led by one Tukulti-Mer, which, by the end of his reign, allowed hordes of Arameans to press in on Assyria's western borders and Assyria lose control of much of the territory it had hitherto controlled or dominated in Babylonia, Anatolia, Levant and Ancient Iran. He is perhaps best known for his zoological and botanical collections.

== Biography ==
His reign marks the point at which the tide turned against the middle Assyrian empire, and substantial Levantine territory to the west was captured by the invading Arameans. Aššūr-bēl-kala was the last of the monarchs of the second millennium for whom there are any significant surviving inscriptions. His annals are recorded on numerous fragments from Aššur and Nineveh.

=== Broken Obelisk ===
The Broken Obelisk, (Note: Broken Obelisk, BM 118898 .) an unfinished part of a monumental inscription in the British Museum, is usually attributed to him following the arguments made by Weidner, Jaritz and Borger, despite its apparent imitation of the campaigns of Tukultī-apil-Ešarra I and his hunting of a nāḫiru (a "sea-horse") in the Mediterranean (the "upper sea of the land of Amurru"). These arguments include the introduction of Babylonian month names, its discovery with a limestone statue of a naked Ištar inscribed with his name, the designation of the Arameans as living in KUR a-re-me, and their evident progress into traditionally Assyrian ruled lands. It was discovered by the ethnic Assyrian archaeologist Hormuzd Rassam in mid-August 1853 at a "locality about half-way between Sennacherib's palace and that of Assurbanipal" and depicts the (enlarged) king towering over bound, supplicant prisoners under five symbols of the gods. Any reconstruction of the events of his reign consequently depends heavily on whether this object is correctly assigned.

In his first year, he campaigned in the north against Urarṭu, delaying his adoption of the eponym office until the following year. In his second, he turned his attention to the countries Himme, Ḫabḫu, and Mari, the latter of which was under the authority of Tukulti-Mer, a pretender to the Assyrian throne. Thereafter his attention was largely absorbed with endless counterattacks against the hordes of Arameans pressing on his western borders, whom he even pursued: "[...in] rafts (of inflated) goatskins I crossed the Euphrates." (Note: Annals, VAT 9539, BM 134497 .) He fought them as far as Carchemish, which he plundered and seized control of, and in the Karbur valley, the Broken Obelisk referencing at least 15 campaigns. Texts recovered from Giricano, ancient Dunnu-ša-Uzibi, mostly dated to the eponym year of Ili-iddina (1069/68) his 5th or 6th year, include one that recalls the fighting the preceding year, the eponymy of Aššur-rem-nišešu, in Dunnu-ša-Liṣur-ṣala-Aššur in the district of Šinamu. After his death the entire region fell to the invaders.

=== Building works and zoo ===
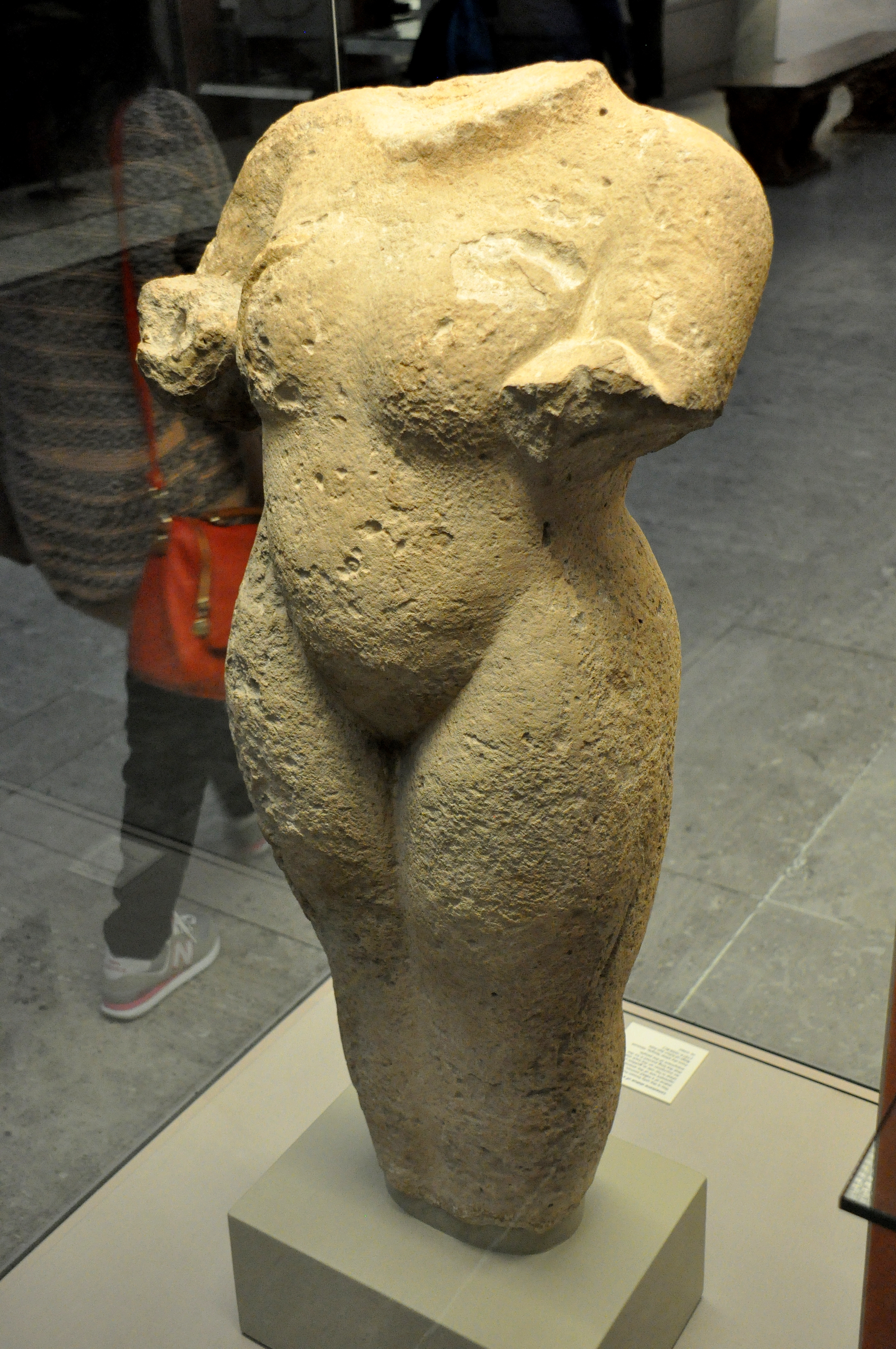
The only known Assyrian statue of a naked woman, erected at the temple of Ishtar in Nineveh, during the reign of Ashur-bel-kala, 1073–1056 BC. Currently housed in the British Museum, London.

Among his civic construction activities were the re-excavation of a city moat and the irrigation of a public garden:

I built the palace of cedar, box-wood, terebinth, (and) tamarisk in my city Aššur. The canal which Ashur-dan I, king of Assyria excavated – the source of that canal had fallen in and for thirty years water had not flowed therein. I again excavated the source of that canal, directed water therein (and) planted gardens.

The continued prestige of Assyria was acknowledged by the gift of exotic animals given in tribute by the Egyptians which nišē mātīšu ušebri, "he displayed (the animals) to the people of his land." These he added to his collection of rare animals which he bred and dispatched merchants to acquire more, such as "a large female ape and a crocodile (and) a 'river man', beasts of the Great Sea" and the dromedaries he displayed in herds. Aššūr-bēl-kala's interests were not solely zoological as he enjoyed hunting and boasts killing wild bulls and cows "at the city of Araziqu which is before the land of Ḫatti and at the foot of Mount Lebanon".

He "rebuilt from top to bottom the storehouses of my lordly palace, which are at the fore part of the enclosure", and Aššur-nādin-aḫḫē's terrace of the New Palace at Nineveh, placed gate guardians inspired by the nāḫiru he had supposedly hunted. He also repaired a quay wall originally built by Adad-nārārī I (c. 1307–1275 BC).

=== Relations with Babylonia ===
After his inauguration, he was apparently visited by the reigning Babylonian king, Marduk-shapik-zeri, who established friendly relations with Ashur-bel-kala", and then returned to Sippar. (Note: Eclectic Chronicle (ABC 24), tablet BM 27859 , obv. 4–7.) This treaty followed the earlier poor relations of their predecessors, Tukultī-apil-Ešarra and Marduk-nadin-ahhe, who the Assyrian king had defeated and was probably motivated by their need to unite to fight their common enemy the Arameans. Marduk-shapik-zeri died around five years later and this seems to have galvanized Aššūr-bēl-kala into intervening militarily in Babylonia to install a successor of his choice:

In that year (the eponym of Aššur-ra’im-nišešu), in the month of Šebat, the chariots and […] went from the Inner City (of Assur) (and) conquered the cities of [x-x]indišulu and […]sandû, cities which are in the district of the city of Dūr-Kurigalzu. They captured Kadašman-Buriaš, the son of Itti-Marduk-balāṭu, governor of their land.

The Synchronistic History (Note: Synchronistic History (ABC 21), ii 25-37.) relates that the next king of Babylon, Adad-apla-iddina, was appointed by Ashur-bel-kalaa, who married his daughter and "took her with a vast dowry to Assyria", while the Eclectic Chronicle gives his father as Itti-Marduk-balāṭu. The Synchronistic History concludes with noting that "the people of Assyria and Babylonia (who spoke the same language) mingled (peacefully) with one another."

His tomb was one of the five found on the lower reaches of the palace at Assur. He was briefly succeeded by his son, Eriba-Adad II, whose short reign was followed by that of his brother Shamshi-Adad IV.

== Inscriptions ==
Preceded by Asharid-apal-Ekur	King of Assyria; 1074–1056 BC	Succeeded by Eriba-Adad II
