= Eriba-Adad II =

- King of Assyria

King of the Middle Assyrian Empire
- Reign: 1056–1054 BC
- Predecessor: Ashur-bel-kala
- Successor: Shamshi-Adad IV
- Father: Ashur-bel-kala
- Mother: Babylonian princess, daughter of Adad-apla-iddina (?)

Erība-Adad II, inscribed ^{m}SU-^{d}IM, "Adad has replaced," was the king of Assyria 1056/55–1054 BC, the 94th to appear on the Assyrian Kinglist. (Note: SDAS Kinglist, iii 31.) (Note: Nassouhi Kinglist, iv 12.) He was the son of Aššur (Ashur-bēl-kala) whom he briefly succeeded and was deposed by his uncle Šamši-Adad IV marking the end of the Middle Assyrian Empire period.

== Reign ==
The Khorsabad kinglist (Note: Khorsabad Kinglist, iii 45,) mistakenly gives him as a son of Ilu-kabkabi, i.e. the father of the 18th century BC king Shamshi-Adad I. Despite his short two-year reign, there are fragmentary inscriptions (Note: Clay cone fragment from Nineveh BM 123467, 6 lines.) (Note: Part of a clay tablet Rm-II.261 (RIMA 2 A.0.90.1), 7.) where he claims his rule extended to the Aramaeans and lists conquests far and wide in intense military campaigns, imitating those of Tiglath-Pileser I, for which he styled himself "king of the four quarters." He would have appeared on a destroyed section of the eponym list designated as Cc. (Note: Eponym List VAT 11254, (KAV 21).)

The Synchronistic Kinglist gives his name, but the Babylonian counterpart is illegible, possibly having been Simbar-shipak based on the sequence of kings before and after. This chronicle seems quite fanciful in its chronology during the Assyrian dark-age. In any case, the king Adad-apla-iddina would have been his contemporary, sheltering his uncle, Šamši-Adad IV in political exile while he regrouped and planned his putsch. Although Aššūr (Ashur)-bēl-kala had married Adad-apla-iddina’s daughter, it seems unlikely that Adad-apla-iddina would have then participated in an effort to depose his own grandson, so it seems likely that Erība-Adad was the issue of another queen and the Babylonian king’s change of attitude due to earlier political events in Assyria.

=== Assur ===
An Assur monumental stele (number 27) from the Stelenreihe, "row of stelae", has been attributed to him and is inscribed laconically: "Erība-adad, king of the universe". He was one of the restorers of the é.ḫur.sağ.kur.kur.ra, "House, Mountain of the Lands", or the cella of the temple of the god Aššur, as commemorated in one of his inscriptions. (Note: K.2693 Part of a clay tablet, with holes, 13 + 5 lines (RIMA 2 A.0.90.1).) A fragmentary literary text is dated to his reign. (Note: Literary text, BM 98941.)

=== Usurpation ===
From Babylon, his rule came to an end when his exiled uncle Šamši-Adad "went up Kardun]iaš He drove Erība-Adad, [son of Aššur (Ashur)-bēl-ka]la, from the throne."

== Inscriptions ==
Preceded by Ashur-bel-kala	King of Assyria; 1056–1054 BC	Succeeded by Shamshi-Adad IV
