= Marduk-shapik-zeri =

Marduk-šāpik-zēri
- King of Babylon
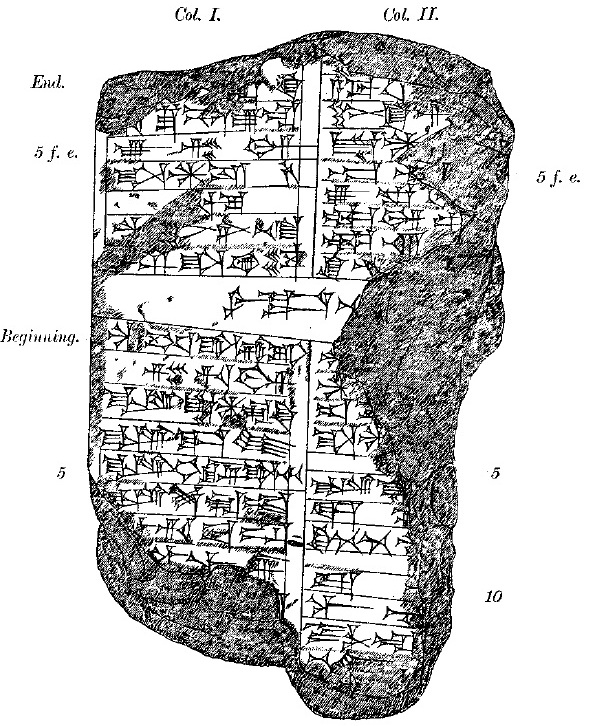
- Cylinder of Marduk-šāpik-zēri commemorating reconstruction of the Imgur-Enlil wall of Babylon. (Note: BE I 148, ii 3-8.)
- Reign: 13 regnal years 1077–1065 BC (Note: Previous scholarship assumed that Marduk-kabit-ahheshu, the founder of the second dynasty of Isin, ruled for the first years of his reign concurrently with the last Kassite king, but per Beaulieu (2018), more recent research suggests that this was not the case, necessitating a revised chronology of the kings after Marduk-kabit-ahheshu. Marduk-shapik-zeri has previously been dated to about 1082–1069 BC, with 1077–1065 BC being Beaulieu's revised dates.)
- Predecessor: Marduk-nadin-aḫḫē
- Successor: Adad-apla-iddina
- House: 2nd Dynasty of Isin

Marduk-šāpik-zēri, inscribed in cuneiform ^{d}AMAR.UTU-DUB-NUMUN or phonetically -ša-pi-ik-ze-ri, and meaning “Marduk (is) the outpourer of seed”, reigned c. 1077–1065 BC, was the 7th king of the 2nd dynasty of Isin and 4th dynasty of Babylon and he ruled for thirteen years. (Note: Babylonian King List C 7.) His relationship with his predecessor, Marduk-nādin-aḫḫē is uncertain. His reign overlapped that of the Assyrian king Aššur-bēl-kala and his immediate predecessor(s) as the Synchronistic King List (Note: Synchronistic King List, tablet KAV 216, excavation reference Ass 14616c, ii 18, 20.) places him alongside both Tukultī-apil-Ešarra and Aššur-bēl-kala.

== Biography ==
He succeeded Marduk-nadin-aḫḫē, who may possibly have been his father or brother, during a time when the Arameans, driven by famine, were engaged in attacking the Assyrias under Tukultī-apil-Ešarra during his latter years, which Younger places in Tukultī-apil-Ešarra’s 32nd year, or 1081/80 BC. The events are recorded on a fragmentary chronicle. (Note: Assyrian chronicle fragment 4 8f.) In a letter from the Babylonian astrologer Bel-ušezib to Esarhaddon, 681 – 669 BC, he wrote, “Bel has said: May Esarhaddon, king of Assyria, be seated on his throne like Marduk-šāpik-zēri! – I will deliver all the countries into his hands!” and this may suggest that he was a younger son of Nabû-kudurri-uṣur or there was perhaps a struggle over the succession.

He repaired the E-zida at Borsippa as witnessed by a building inscription, reproduced on a neo-Babylonian tablet, (Note: BM 26295.) from the reign of Kandalanu whose colophon records that it was copied by Nabû-šumu-līšir. He provided gold votive offerings to the temples of Ur, Nippur and elsewhere. He rebuilt the wall of Babylon, the Imgur-Enlil, for which a fragmentary inscription has come to light, (Note: in qé r[e-eb] ká.dingir.[ra^{ki} ba-ba-[ti] ú-dan-n[in-ma] bàd im-gur-[^{d}en-lil] bàd x-[…]) confirmed by the Eclectic Chronicle (Note: The Eclectic Chronicle (ABC 24), tablet BM 27859 obverse lines 4 to 7.) which continues:

He conquered the kings of the lands. During his reign, the people of the land enjoyed prosperity. He made an entente cordiale with Aššur-bêl-kala, king of Assyria. At that time, the king went from Assyria to Sippar.

— Eclectic Chronicle, Lines 5 to 7.

The Synchronistic Chronicle (Note: Synchronistic Chronicle (ABC 21) ii 25-30.) confirms the alliance with Assyria, probably forged to counter the growing threat from the Arameans, and notes that he died during Aššur-bêl-kala’s reign. This records his name as Marduk-shapik-zer-mati and it has been argued by Poebel that this is merely a scribal error, where MAN, šar, “king,” was taken to be part of his name. There seems to have been a military intervention in the region of Dūr-Kurgalzu by Aššur-bel-kala towards the end of his reign, as the Assyrian king’s Broken Obelisk inscription records that he captured Kadašman-Buriaš, “governor of their land.”

A kudurru (Note: Kudurru BM 104404, XII.) records the recovery of certain landed property by Sîn-Kabti-ilāni, the son of Šamaš-šum-lišir and grandson of Kudurri, the šāqû (^{lú}BI.LUL), “cupbearer”. He granted land (Note: Land grant to Širikti-Šuqamuna kudurru, IM 74651 in the National Museum of Iraq) in his first year to his trusty šakin bāb ekalli, or palace gate officer, Širikti-Šuqamuna, the successor in this role to Uzib-Šiparru, and the land surveyor Nabû-zēra-iddina, “son of Arad-Ea”, was dispatched with a court official to measure it. A kudurru of his reign (Note: Kudurru IM 80908.) records another member of the Arad-Ea clan measuring a field with a local official. If the reference to Marduk-[…] can be identified with him in the Chronicle of the Market Prices, (Note: Chronicle of the Market Prices (ABC 23), broken tablet BM 48498, lines 14 and 15.) the cost of goods was unexceptional. Another fragment of a kudurru (Note: Kudurru YBC 2154, in the Yale Babylonian Collection, New Haven.) has a secondary inscription dated to his twelfth year. An inscription of Napsamenni, chief of the seers and high priest of Enlil in Nippur, adorns a duck weight, and there is an economic text (Note: IM 85484, fragment of an administrative document, excavated 1926–7 by Woolley in the domestic quarter just outside the south-west wall of the temenos at Ur.) dated to his third year. This is an administrative record of an inspection by a storeman dated to the 30th day of the month of Ayaru (around March) marked with the seal of the king's officer, Adad-kudurra-uṣur.
