= Adad-apla-iddina =

- King of Babylon
- Reign: c. 1064–1043 BC (Note: Previous scholarship assumed that Marduk-kabit-ahheshu, the founder of the second dynasty of Isin, ruled for the first years of his reign concurrently with the last Kassite king, but per Beaulieu (2018), more recent research suggests that this was not the case, necessitating a revised chronology of the kings after Marduk-kabit-ahheshu. Adad-apla-iddina has previously been dated to about 1067–1046 BC, with 1064–1043 BC being Beaulieu's revised dates.)
- Predecessor: Marduk-šapik-zeri
- Successor: Marduk-aḫḫe-eriba
- House: 2nd Dynasty of Isin

Adad-apla-iddina, typically inscribed in cuneiform ^{md}IM-DUMU.UŠ-SUM-na, ^{md}IM-A-SUM-na (Note: ^{md}Adad-àpla-idinna^{na}.) or ^{d}IM-ap-lam-i-din-[nam] meaning the storm god “Adad has given me an heir”, was the 8th king of the 2nd Dynasty of Isin and the 4th Dynasty of Babylon and ruled c. 1064–1043. He was a contemporary of the Assyrian King Aššur-bêl-kala and his reign was a golden age for scholarship.

== Biography ==
=== Provenance ===
The broken obelisk of Aššur-bêl-kala relates that the Assyrians raided Babylonia, early in his reign:

In that year (the eponomy of Aššur-rēm-nišēšu), in the month of Shebat, (11th month, Jan.-Feb.), the chariots and […] went from the Inner City (Assur) (and) conquered the cities of [x-x]indišulu and […]sandû, cities which are in the district of the city of Dūr-Kurigalzu. They captured Kadašman-Buriaš, the son of Itti-Marduk-Balāṭu, governor of their land.

— Aššur-bêl-kala, From column iii lines 1 to 32. (Note: Broken Obelisk excavation ref. 11.2.467,480.)

Depending on the exact synchronization of the Assyrian and Babylonian chronologies, this would have been shortly before, or at the very beginning of Adad-apla-iddina’s reign.

His ancestor Esagil-Šaduni is named in the Synchronistic History (Note: The Synchronistic History (ABC 21) column 2 lines 31 to 37.) as his “father”, but he was actually ”a son of a nobody,” i.e. without a royal parent. This chronicle recounts that he was appointed by the Assyrian king Aššur-bêl-kala, who took his daughter for a wife and “took her with a vast dowry to Assyria,” suggesting Babylon had become a vassal of Assyria. He names Nin-Duginna as his father in one of his own inscriptions, but this is indicative of divine provenance. Adad-apla-iddina who was “son” of Itti-Marduk-balaṭu, recorded in the Chronicle 24: 8 (Note: The Eclectic Chronicle (ABC 24) tablet, BM 27859, lines 8 to 11.) and also duplicated in the Walker Chronicle (Note: The Walker Chronicle (ABC 25), BM 27796.) possibly meaning a descendant of the early 2nd Dynasty of Isin king, by a collateral line, or speculatively the aforementioned father of Kadašman-Buriaš.

His reign was apparently marked by an invasion of Arameans led by a usurper. (Note: ^{kur}A-ra-mu u šarru ḫammā’u.) “Der, Dur-Anki (Nippur). Sippar, Parsa (Dur-Kurigalzu) they demolished. The Suteans attacked and the booty of Sumer and Akkad they took home.” These attacks were confirmed in an inscription of a later king of the following dynasty, Simbar-šihu, which relates

The throne of Ellil in the E-kur-igi-gal which Nabū-kudurri-uṣur, a former king, had fashioned – during the reign of Adad-apla-iddina, king of Bābil, hostile Arameans and Suteans, (Note: ^{lú}nakru A-ra-mu ù Su-tu-ú.) enemies of the E-kur and of Nippur, they who laid hands on the Duranki, (who) upset in Sippar, the pristine town, the seat of the high judge of the gods, their rites, (who) sacked the land of the Sumerians and the Akkadians, leveled all temples – the goods and the property of Ellil which the Arameans carried off and which the Suteans had appropriated…

— Simbar-šihu, Inscription

The Epic of the plague-god Erra, a politico-religious composition from the time of Nabu-apla-iddina, c. 886-853 BC, which endeavors to provide a theological explanation for the resurgence of Babylonia following years of paralysis, begins its tale of distress with the reign of Adad-apla-iddina. The god Erra, whose name means “scorched (earth),” is accompanied by Išum, "fire," and disease-causing demons called Sibitti.

=== Period scholarship ===
His reign was celebrated in the first millennium BCE as a golden age for scholarship and he appears twice in the Uruk List of Sages and Scholars (Note: W 20030,7:17 the Seleucid List of Sages and Scholars, recovered from Anu’s Bīt Rēš temple during the 1959/60 excavation.) alongside Šaggil-kīnam-ubbib and Esagil-kin-apli.

The Babylonian Theodicy was attributed to the scholar Šaggil-kīnam-ubbib and believed to have been composed during his reign according to a later literary catalogue. (Note: K. 10802 r 2.) It is a dialogue where the protagonist bemoans the state of contemporary social justice and his friend reconciles this with theology. Originally with 27 stanzas each of 11 lines, an acrostic has been restored which reads, “I, Šaggil-kīnam-ubbib, the incantation priest, am adorant of the god and the king.” (Note: a-na-ku sa-ag-gi-il-ki-[i-na-am-u]b-bi-ib ma-àš-ma-šu ka-ri-bu ša i-li ú šar-ri.) It is extant in multiple copies from the Library of Ashurbanipal in Nineveh, Assur, Babylon, and Sippur. His career was believed to have spanned the reigns of Nabū-kudurri-uṣur to Adad-apla-iddina, or five reigns if the latter king’s name can be restored in context.

Esagil-kin-apli, (Note: ^{m}é-sag-giI-ki-in-ap-li.) the ummânu (chief scholar) and a “prominent citizen” of Borsippa, gathered together the many extant tablets of diagnostic omens and produced the edition that became the received text of the first millennium. (Note: Tablets BM 41237, 46607 and 47163 and ND (Nimrud excavation numbers) 4358+4366 in the British Museum.) In the introduction he warned, “Do not neglect your knowledge! He who does not attain(?) knowledge must not speak aloud the SA.GIG omens, nor must he pronounce out loud Alamdimmû SA.GIG (concerns) all diseases and all (forms of) distress.” Referred to as SA.GIG, the omen series continued on a series of 40 tablets grouped under six chapters. He may also have been responsible for editing other physiognomic omen works including the Alamdimmû, Nigdimdimmû, Kataduggû, Šumma Sinništu, and Šumma Liptu.

There is also a late copy of an astrological text originally dated to his eleventh year. (Note: Tablet K. 6156 + 6141 + 6148 + 9108.)

=== Contemporary evidence ===
He rebuilt extensively, including the Imgur-Enlil, city wall of Babylon, which had collapsed from old age according to a cylinder inscription, and the Nīmit-Marduk, rampart of the wall of Nippur, commemorated on a cone. He made a votive offering of an engraved gold belt to the statue of Nabû at the E-zida temple at Borsippa. (Note: BM 79503 clay tablet copy of inscription by Arad-Gula during the reign of Esarhaddon.) The ramp leading up to the temple of Nin-ezena in Isin bears his inscriptions recording his repairs. In Larsa, he repaired the Ebabbar temple and in Kiš he reconstructed the Emete’ursag for Zababa. Stamped bricks witness his construction efforts in Babylon (Note: Brick, Bab. 59431.) and to the great Nanna courtyard and in the pavement against the northeast face of the ziggurat at Ur. (Note: Bricks, BM 116989 and CBS 16482.)

There are seven extant economic texts (Note: Tablets: L74.100 (administrative, 5th year), UM 29-15-598 (legal 5th or 15th year), N 4512 (legal, 8th year), HS 156 no. 8.2.8 (economic 10th year), CBS 8074 (economic 13th year), NBC 11468 (grain account, 18th year), and NBC 11469 (grain account, 19th year).) ranging in date from his fifth to his nineteenth year. A stone tablet records a legal transaction and is dated to his first year. (Note: Stone tablet, VA 5937.) A fragment of a kudurru (Note: Fragment of basalt boundary-stone, BM 90940.) records his gift of an estate to Mušallimu and another (Note: Fragment of limestone tablet, BM 103215.) records a deed of land to Marduk-akhu-[ ... .].

He may well have connived to replace Aššur-bêl-kala’s son and successor, Eriba-Adad II, with his uncle, Šamši-Adad IV, who had been in exile in Babylonia.
