= Marduk-nadin-ahhe =

Marduk-nādin-aḫḫē
- King of Babylon
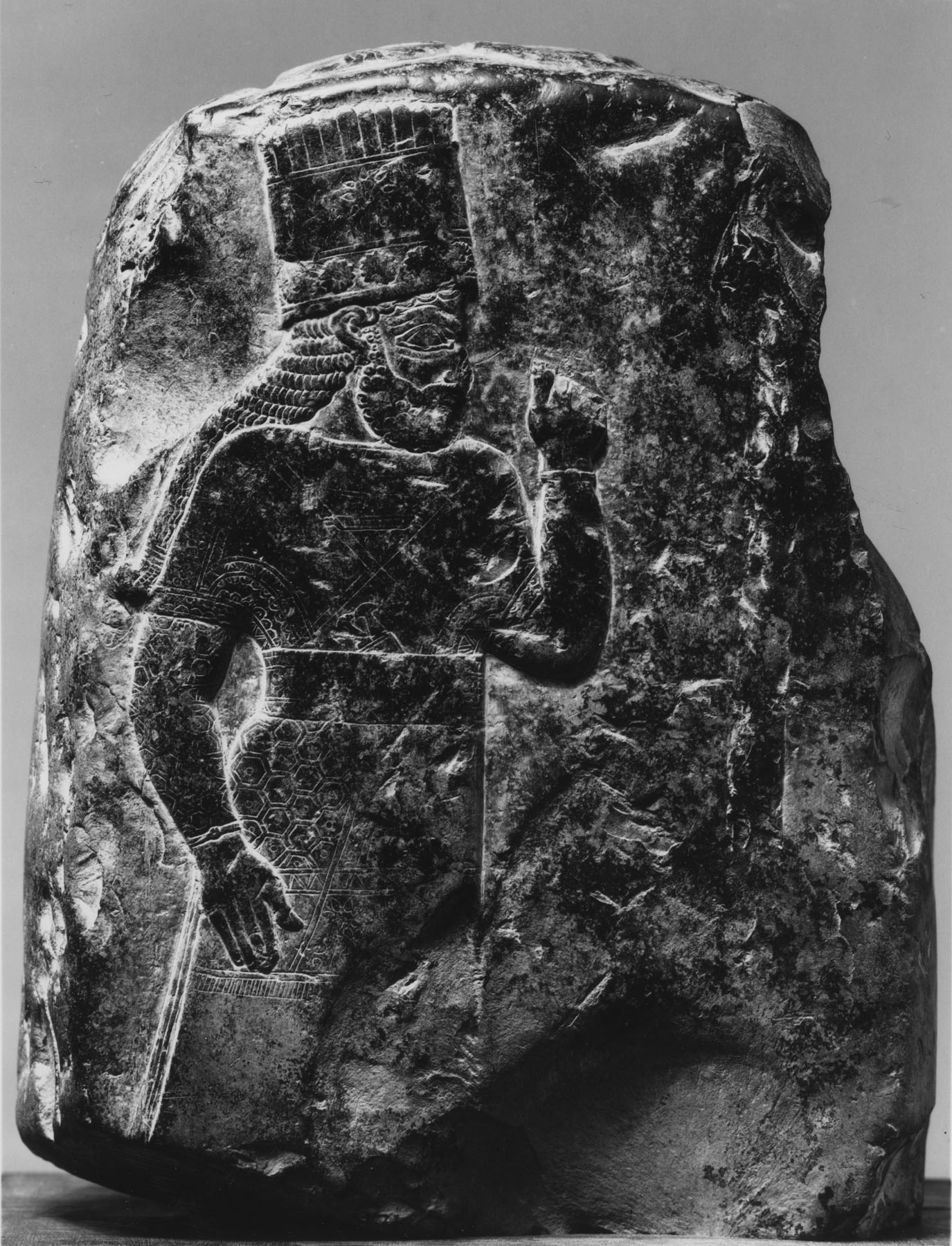
- Amrân ibn ‘Ali kudurru (Note: Kudurru in the Walters Art Museum, Baltimore, Accession number 21.10.) in the Walters Art Museum, Baltimore.
- Reign: c. 1095–1078 BC (Note: Previous scholarship assumed that Marduk-kabit-ahheshu, the founder of the second dynasty of Isin, ruled for the first years of his reign concurrently with the last Kassite king, but per Beaulieu (2018), more recent research suggests that this was not the case, necessitating a revised chronology of the kings after Marduk-kabit-ahheshu. Marduk-nadin-ahhe has previously been dated to about 1099–1082 BC, with 1095–1078 BC being Beaulieu's revised dates.)
- Predecessor: Enlil-nādin-apli
- Successor: Marduk-šāpik-zēri
- House: 2nd Dynasty of Isin

Marduk-nādin-aḫḫē, inscribed ^{md}AMAR.UTU-na-din-MU, reigned c. 1095–1078 BC, was the sixth king of the Second Dynasty of Isin and the 4th Dynasty of Babylon. (Note: Babylonian King List C, line 6.) He is best known for his restoration of the Eganunmaḫ in Ur and the famines and droughts that accompanied his reign.

== Biography ==
He was related to all three of his immediate predecessors: his father was Ninurta-nādin-šumi, the third king, his brother was Nabu-kudurri-uṣur, the fourth king, and his nephew was Enlil-nādin-apli the fifth king, whom he revolted against and deposed. A reconstructed passage in the Walker Chronicle (Note: BM 27796 Babylonian Chronicle 25, reverse lines 19 to 26.) describes how while Enlil-nādin-apli was away campaigning in Assyria, supposedly marching to conquer the city of Assur itself, Marduk-nādin-aḫḫē and the nobles rebelled. On his return “to his land and his city. They [kill]ed him with the s[word].”

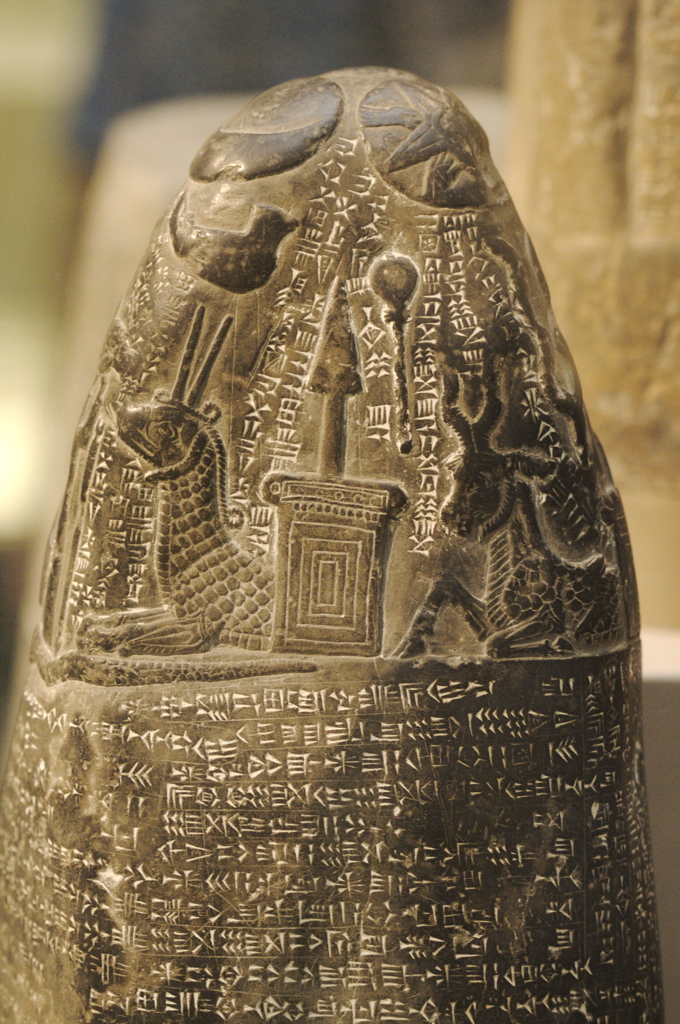
Land grant to Adad-zer-iqiša, kudurru (Note: BM 90840, published as BBSt 8.) in the British Museum

His relationship with his Assyrian counterpart, Tukultī-apil-Ešarra, (Note: Synchronistic king list, KAV 216, Ass 14616c, ii 17 and fragment KAV 12, VAT 11338, 5ff.) was antagonistic and he launched a raid early in his reign into Assyria, capturing the cultic idols of Adad and Šala from Ekallāte, a town only around thirty miles from Assur. For his part, Tukultī-apil-Ešarra led several retaliatory raids into the heartland of Babylonia, recalled with typical bombastic rhetoric:

I marched to the land of Karduniaš. I conquered the cities Dūr-Kurigalzu, Sippar of Šamaš, Sippar of Anunitu, Babylon and Upi, the great shrine of Karduniaš, including their fortresses. I massacred them in great number. I plundered countless amounts of their booty. I conquered the palaces of Babylon belonging to Marduk-nādin-aḫḫē, the king of Karduniaš, and I burned them with fire. Twice I drew up a battle line of chariots against Marduk-nādin-aḫḫē, the king of Karduniaš, and I defeated him.

— Tukultī-apil-Ešarra, Building Inscription, lines 37 to 40. (Note: Weidner’s “Text II”, AfO 18 (1957-58) pp. 347ff.)

The Synchronistic History recalls the battles were in the first instance “by the Lower Zab, opposite Ahizûhina, and in the second year he defeated Marduk-nadin-ahhe at Gurmarritu, which is upstream from Akkad.” (Note: Synchronistic History ii 14-24, preserved in three copies, K 4401a + Rm 854, K 4401b and Sm 2106.) Although “Ugarsallu (immediately south of the Lesser Zab) he plundered as far as Lubda (located in the area of Arrapḫa). He ruled every part of Suhu (in the middle Euphrates Valley) as far as Rapiqu (southern border of Assyria),” these places are on the periphery of Babylonia and the idols were not recovered until centuries later:

After 418 years I took out of Babylon and returned to their sanctuaries Adad and Šala, the gods of Ekallāte, whom Marduk-nādin-aḫḫē, king of Babylon, had seized and carried off to Babylon in the time of Tukultī-apil-Ešarra, king of Assyria.

— Sennacherib of Assyria, on his destruction of Babylon after a fifteen-month siege, having taken the city 1 Kislev 689., Bavian Inscription

=== Kudurru tradition ===
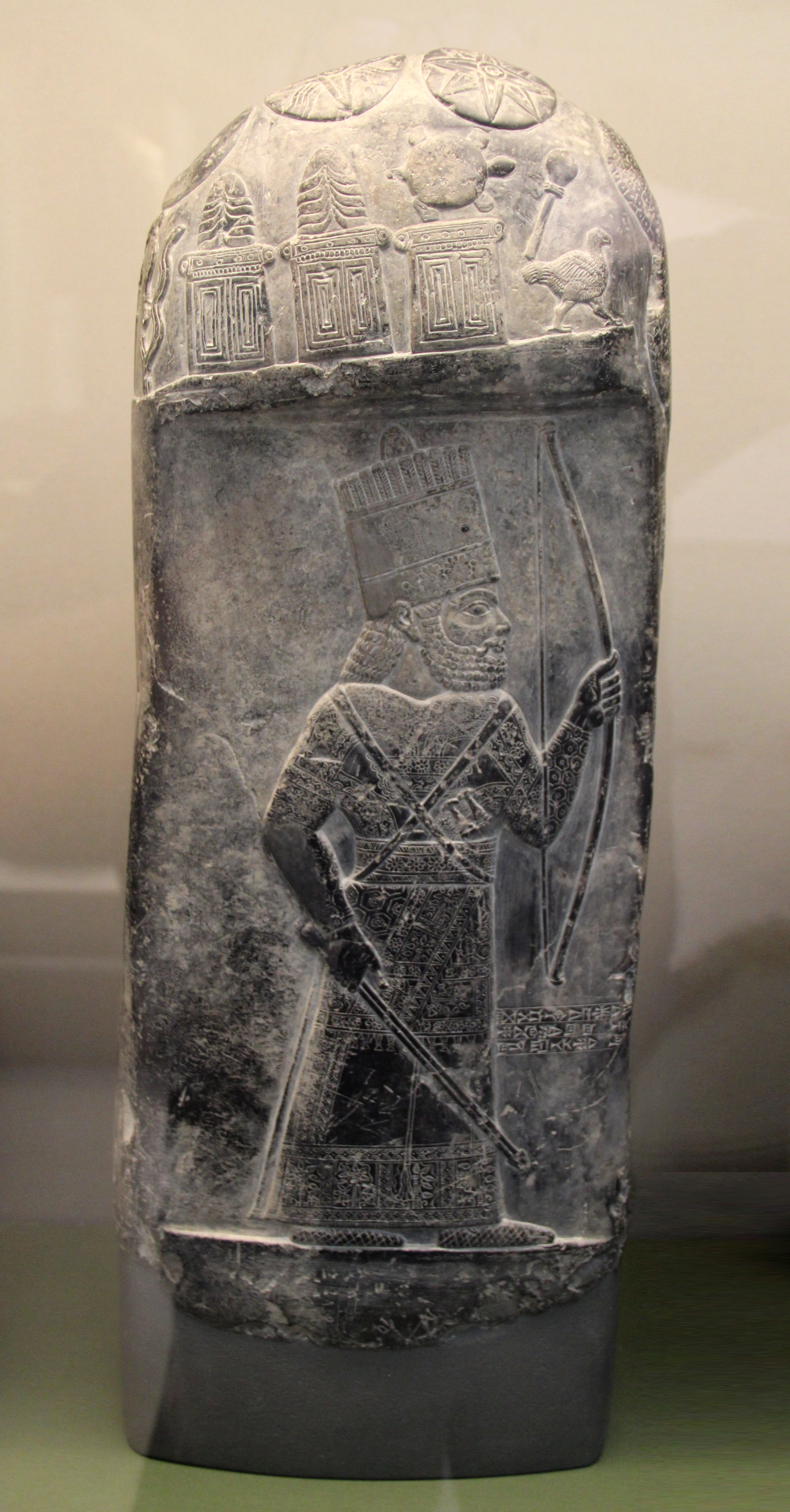
Deed recording the purchase of five GUR of corn-land by Marduk-nasir, the king's officer, (Note: BM 90841, published as BBSt. VII.) in the British Museum.

There are seven kudurrus, two building inscriptions, four Luristan bronze daggers, one (Note: Luristan dagger ME 123060.) "belonging to Šamaš-killani, officer of the king," a Sumerian inscription on a copper cylinder (Note: Copper Cylinder BM 123124, 61 lines.) and one unpublished garment inventory (Note: Economic text H.S. 157 dated to his fifth year listing clothes brought to Nippur from Babylon by Napsamenni, seer and high priest of Enlil.) attesting to this king. The kudurrus show normal real estate activity in northern Babylonia. One, (Note: Aradsu, son of Rišnunak, Kudurru BM 90938, published as BBSt 25.) issued by Aradsu, son of Rišnunak, grants independence from forced labor for the residents living near the mouth of the Ṣalmani Canal, dated to his first year. Another gives land to a certain Adad-zer-iqiša in grateful thanks for his efforts fighting the Assyrians and is dated to his 10th year. One of the witnesses is given as Abullu-tetaparâu, the son of the king of Babylon. Another, (Note: Kudurru IM 90585, ii 10.) dated to his 13th year, confirms the ownership of seven GUR of arable land to a certain Iqīša-Ninurta and is witnessed in the city of Opis.

Another kudurru (Note: The Warwick Kudurru, Warwickshire Museum.) dated eight months earlier in the same year granted Iddin-Ninurta, a leather worker, two GUR of land and was witnessed by the same seven officers of royal service: Irība-Ištarān, the governor of Isin, Bābilāiu, the chamberlain, Eulmaš-šākin-šumi, the marshall, Marduk-andulli, the vizier, Enlil-mukîn-apli, the commandant, Ea-kudirri-ibni, the provincial governor and Nabû-nādin-aḫḫē, the overseer of the storehouse. As this was from Kār-Bēl-mātāti, a town probably in the vicinity of Babylon, it is thought the men were courtiers who accompanied the king in his travels. Only two of these officials, Bābilāiu and Nabû-nādin-aḫḫē, had been in office during Marduk-nādin-aḫḫē's first year, as they appeared in the sequence of seven witnesses on the earliest, "Aradsu, son of Rišnunak," kudurru. Another is a deed recording Marduk-naṣir's purchase of land from Amêl-Enlil, son of Khanbi, for a chariot, saddles, two asses, an ox, grain, oil, and certain garments. This gives Šapiku, the son of Itti-Marduk-balāṭu, the “son” of Arad-Ea, as the land-surveyor and this is probably the same individual as the last witness, “scribe” and “son of Arad-Ea,” on a kudurru (Note: YBC 2154 kudurru.) dated to Marduk-nādin-aḫḫē's eighth year.

=== Kudurrus dated to his reign ===
- The Amrân ibn ‘Ali kudurru in the Walters Art Museum, Baltimore.
- Land grant to Adad-zer-iqiša kudurru, in the British Museum
- Marduk-naṣir land purchase kudurru, in the British Museum
- Aradsu, son of Rišnunak, tax exemption tablet, in the British Museum
- Iqīša-Ninurta land deed confirmation kudurru, in the National Museum of Iraq
- The Warwick (“Land grant to Iddin-Ninurta”) Kudurru, Warwickshire Museum
- Land purchase kudurru with a secondary inscription of Marduk-šāpik-zēri, in the Yale Babylonian Collection

Also assigned to this era is the undated Caillou Michaux (kudurru), in the Musée du Louvre.

=== Other sources ===
He restored the Eganunmaḫ at Ur, without any apparent alteration to the plan of Kassite king Kurigalzu's (Kurigalzu I or II undetermined) original plan, and constructed a “kitchen complex” on the northwest side of the ziggurat. Three inscribed door-sockets were found at the sanctuary. He may be portrayed by the 3rd king in the Prophecy A, (Note: Obverse ii 2-8.) whose reign is a successful and fertile 18 years, but whose rule comes to end in a revolt. According to a later commentator, a certain Ea-mušallim provided him with an astrological report (ittu ina šamȇ) concerning a solar eclipse in 1090.

As to the rains which have been so scanty this year that no harvests were reaped, it is a good omen for the life and vigour of the king, my lord. Perhaps, the king, my lord, will say: “Where did you find (this)? Tell me!” In a report by Ea-mušillim to his lord Marduk-nādin-aḫḫē, it is written: “If a sign occurs in the sky that cannot be cancelled, and if it happens to you that rains become scanty (maqāt zunnē), make the king undertake a campaign against the enemy: he will be victorious wherever he goes and his days will be long.”

— Akkullanu, Ashurbanipal’s astrologer, LAS 110 + 300, reverse 1 to 11 (Note: 83-1-18,61 + Ki 1904-10-9,59 [BM 99030].)

An Assyrian Chronicle reports that Marduk-nadin-ahhe lost his throne and “disappeared” (šadâ ēmid) following disruptions caused by Arameans migrating into Mesopotamia under the pressure from famine, the Babylonians themselves apparently resorting to cannibalism, "[....they] ate one another's flesh..." (Note: Assyrian chronicle fragment 4, VAT 10453, 2f.)
