= Tiglath-Pileser I =

12th-11th century BCE Assyrian king

- King of Assyria; King of the Four Corners of the World
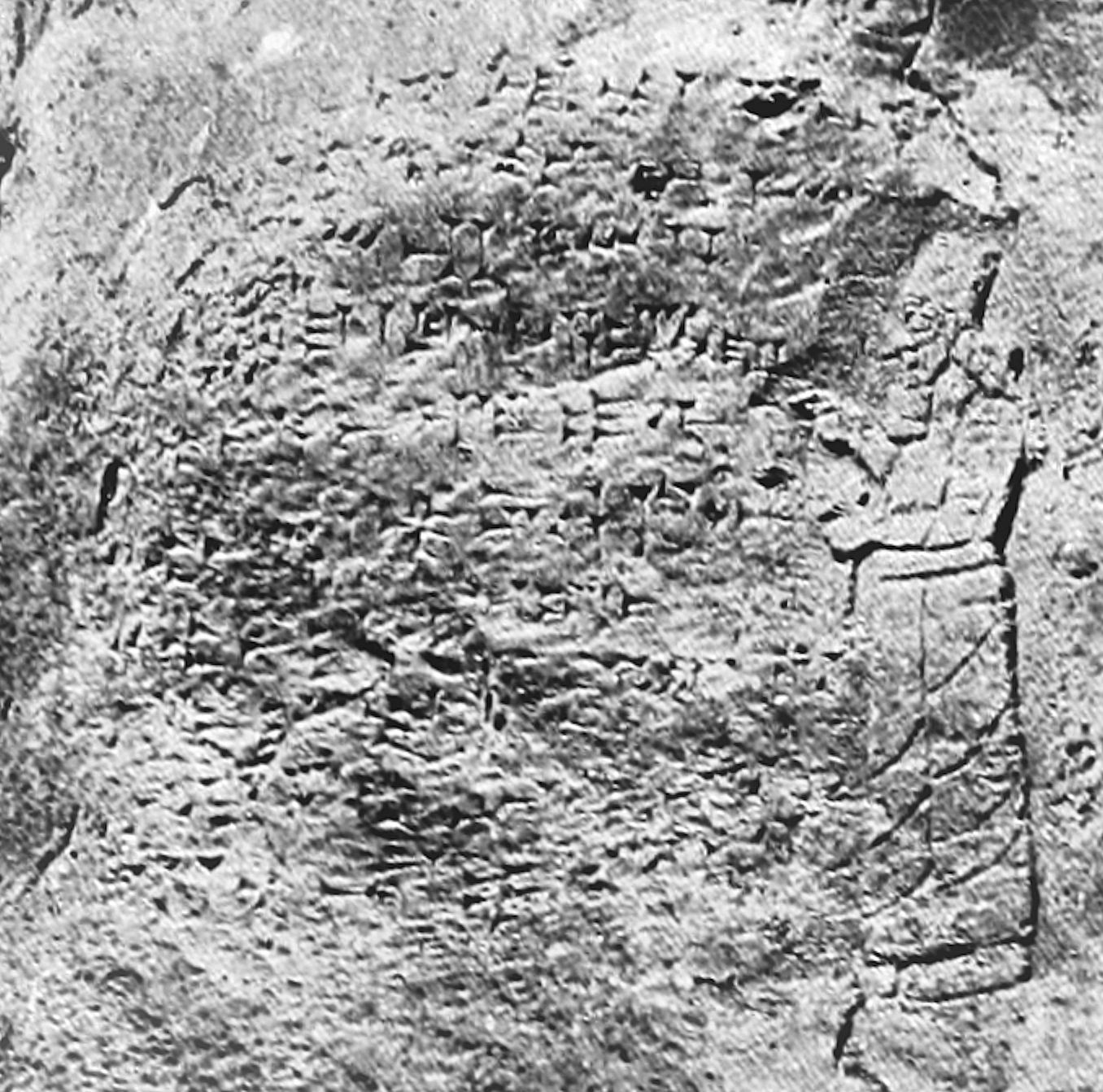
- Rock relief of Tiglath-Pileser I

King of the Middle Assyrian Empire
- Reign: 1114–1076 BC
- Predecessor: Ashur-resh-ishi I
- Successor: Asharid-apal-Ekur
- Died: 1076 BC
- Issue: Asharid-apal-Ekur, Ashur-bel-kala, Shamshi-Adad IV
- Akkadian: 𒆪𒋾𒀀𒂍𒈗𒊏; TUKUL.TI.A.É.ŠÁR.RA; Tukultī-apil-Ešarra
- Father: Ashur-resh-ishi I
- Religion: Ancient Mesopotamian religion

Tiglath-Pileser I (/ˈtɪɡləθ paɪˈliːzər, -ˌlæθ, pɪ-/; from the Hebraic form of Middle Assyrian Akkadian: 𒆪𒋾𒀀𒂍𒈗𒊏, romanized: Tukultī-apil-Ešarra, "my trust is in the son of Ešarra") was a king of Assyria during the Middle Assyrian Empire (1114–1076 BC). According to Georges Roux, Tiglath-Pileser was "one of the two or three great Assyrian monarchs since the days of Shamshi-Adad I". He was known for his "wide-ranging military campaigns, his enthusiasm for building projects, and his academic interest in cuneiform tablet collections". Under him, Assyria confirmed its position as the leading power of the Ancient Near East, a position the kingdom largely maintained for the next five hundred years. He further expanded Assyrian control deeper into Anatolia, Levant and Ancient Iran, and to the shores of the Mediterranean Sea. From his surviving inscriptions, he seems to have carefully cultivated a fear of himself in his subjects and in his enemies alike.

The beginning of Tiglath-Pileser's I reign had heavy involvement in military campaigns, as suggested from translated texts from the Middle Assyrian Empire period. The texts were believed to be "justification of war." Although little literary text is available from the time of Tiglath-Pileser I, there is evidence to show that the reign of Tiglath-Pileser I inspired the act of recording information, including that of his military campaigns. Toward the end of Tiglath-Pileser's reign literary texts took the form of "summary texts" which served as a vessel for as much information about his reign as possible, with the intent to be handed down to his successor.

== Reign ==
The son of Ashur-resh-ishi I, he ascended to the throne in 1115 BC, and became one of the greatest of Assyrian conquerors. Tiglath-Pileser I referred to himself as "unrivalled king of the universe, king of the four quarters, king of all princes, lord of lords… whose weapons the god Assur has sharpened and whose name he has pronounced eternally for control of the four quarters… splendid flame which covers the hostile land like a rain storm". Alongside this view of himself, he emphasized the brutality of his takeover of numerous lands, and was the first Assyrian king to claim hostages, occasionally children, as a political instrument against conquered peoples.

His first campaign was against the Phrygians (Mushku) in 1112 BC, who had occupied certain Assyrian controlled districts in the Anatolian Upper Euphrates; then he overran Commagene and Cappadocia, and drove the Hittites from the Assyrian ruled Hurrian province of Subartu, northeast of Malatia.

In a subsequent campaign, the Assyrian forces penetrated into the mountains south of Lake Van and then turned westward to receive the submission of Malatia. In his fifth year, Tiglath-Pileser attacked Comana in Cappadocia, and placed a record of his victories engraved on copper plates in a fortress he built to secure his Cilician conquests.

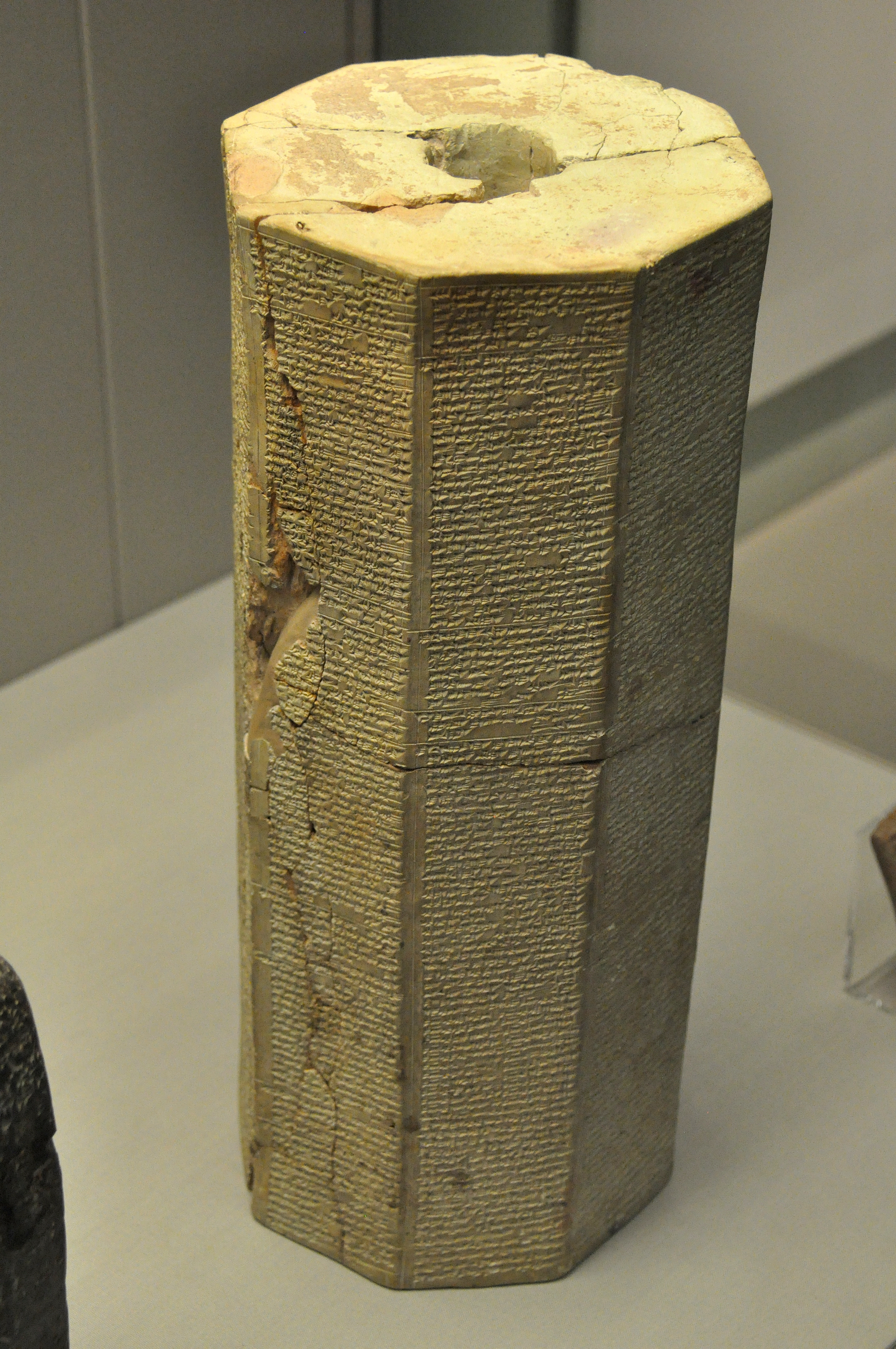
Terracotta octagon of the king Tiglath-pileser I, 1110 BCE, from Assur, Iraq. It mentions the civil and military achievements of Tiglath-Pileser I, such as the campaigns against the Muski and Kumuh and the conquest of Carchemish which was incorporated into Assyria. It also mentions building activities in Ashur and other cities and repairs to the temple of Anu and Adad (Hadad) founded by Shamshi-Adad I in about 1725 BCE. British Museum BM 91033.

The Arameans emerged in a region which was largely under the domination of the Middle Assyrian Empire (1365–1050 BC) and established a string of small states in the region. In order to nullify this threat, Tiglath-Pileser I performed many campaigns in the Levant against the Arameans and other tribal peoples.

The control of the high road to the Mediterranean was secured by the possession of the Hittite town of Pitru at the junction between the Euphrates and Sajur; thence he proceeded to 'Gubal (Byblos), Sidon, Berytus and finally to Arvad where he embarked onto a ship to sail the Mediterranean, on which he killed a nahiru or "sea-horse" (which A. Leo Oppenheim translates as a narwhal) in the sea.

The general view is that the restoration of the temple of the gods Ashur and Adad at Assyrian capital of Assur was one of his initiatives. It is also believed he was one of the first kings to commission parks and botanical gardens with foreign trees and plants brought from around the empire.

The latter part of his reign seems to have been a period of retrenchment, as Aramaean tribesmen put pressure on his realm. He died in 1076 BC and was succeeded by his son Asharid-apal-Ekur. The later kings Ashur-bel-kala and Shamshi-Adad IV were also his sons.

=== Annals and texts ===
Tiglath-Pileser's I inscriptions from his "fifth year annals" varied in form, from inscriptions on prisms to cuneiform inscriptions on tablets. A.0.87.i (or RIMA 2) was inscribed on multiple 8-sided prisms and included 6 military campaigns that Marco De Odorico affirms as easily identifiable given that "the subdivision of paragraphs by horizontal lines... as well as the introduction begin with 'in my succession year'".

Considering that much of Tiglath-Pileser I's reign involved military campaigns, it is unsurprising that most of his literary texts would include such information as "Altogether I conquered 42 lands and their rulers from the other side of the Lower Zab in distant mountainous regions to the other side of the Euphrates, people of Hatti, and the Upper Sea in the west – from my accession year to my fifth regnal year." Tiglath-Pileser I's prism was essentially a year-by-year layout of his military campaigns, and today is considered one of the world's first-preserved annals.

=== Returning from the campaigns ===
Tiglath-Pileser I's annals contain military campaign documentation, as well as records of tribute. Once returned from a successful war campaign Tiglath-Pileser I is said to have had statues of the various animals he had come into contact with as well as hunted. From the translated annals text, it is said that he had "2 nāhirū (horse of the sea) sculptures, 4 burhiš sculptures, 4 lions constructed of basalt, 2 bull colossi made of alabaster, 2 burhiš sculptures made of white limestone and had them set up at the gates in the City of Ashur"

These statues were mainly used to decorate the "royal entrance", a practice that was taken up by Tiglath-Pileser I's son Aššur-bel-kala after his father's death. In addition to erecting statues of animals his people had never seen, Tiglath-Pileser I returned from some war campaigns with the living animals themselves, including calves of wild bulls as well as elephants.

== See also ==
- Tiglath-Pileser II
- Tiglath-Pileser III

== Sources ==
- Bryce, Trevor, The Routledge Handbook of The People and Places of Ancient Western Asia: The Near East from the Early Bronze Age to the fall of the Persians Empire, p. 563
- Harper, Robert Francis; et al. (1901). Babylonian and Assyrian Literature. New York: D. Appleton and company.
- Leick, Gwendolyn (March 1, 2010). The A to Z of Mesopotamia. Scarecrow Press. p. 171. ISBN 978-0810875777.

Attribution:

Preceded by Ashur-resh-ishi I	King of Assyria; 1115–1077 BC	Succeeded by Asharid-apal-Ekur
