= Revolt of Babylon =

Revolt of Babylon may refer to:

- Revolt of Babylon (722 BC) – successful revolt by Marduk-apla-iddina II against Assyrian kings Shalmaneser V and Sargon II.
- Revolt of Babylon (703 BC) – unsuccessful revolt by Marduk-zakir-shumi II and later Marduk-apla-iddina II against Assyrian king Sennacherib.
- Revolt of Babylon (694 BC) – unsuccessful revolt by Nergal-ushezib and later Mushezib-Marduk against Assyrian king Sennacherib.
- Revolt of Babylon (652 BC) – unsuccessful revolt by Shamash-shum-ukin against Assyrian king Ashurbanipal.
- Revolt of Babylon (626 BC) – successful revolt by Nabopolassar against Assyrian king Sinsharishkun, which saw the establishment of the Neo-Babylonian Empire.
- Revolt of Babylon (522 BC) – unsuccessful revolt by Nebuchadnezzar III against Persian king Darius I.
- Revolt of Babylon (521 BC) – unsuccessful revolt by Nebuchadnezzar IV against Persian king Darius I.
- Babylonian revolts (484 BC) – unsuccessful revolts by Bel-shimanni and Shamash-eriba against Persian king Xerxes I.
- Revolt of Babylon (336 BC) – unsuccessful revolt by Nidin-Bel against Persian king Darius III.
