= Nidin-Bel =

Possible King of Babylon from 336 to 335 BC

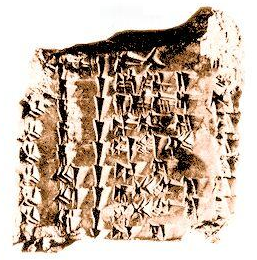
- The reverse side of the Uruk King List (IM 65066). The first line on this side of the tablet is the fragmentary line which references Nidin-Bel.

King of Babylon
- Reign: Autumn 336 BC and/or winter 336–335 BC
- Predecessor: Artaxerxes IV (Achaemenid Empire)
- Successor: Darius III (Achaemenid Empire)
- Akkadian: Nidin-Bêl

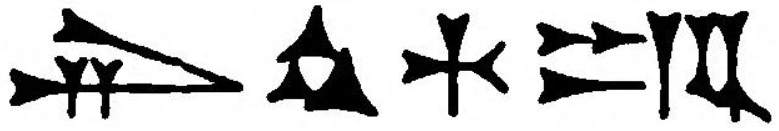
Nidin-Bel (Babylonian cuneiform: Nidin-Bêl) (Note: Nidin-Bêl might be a corrupted or colloquial form of the name Nidintu-Bêl, which means "gift of Bêl".) might have been a rebel king of Babylon who in the autumn of 336 BC and/or the winter of 336–335 BC attempted to restore Babylonia as an independent kingdom and end the rule of the Persian Achaemenid Empire in the region. The only known surviving reference which points to there being a ruler by this name in Babylon is the Uruk King List, which records rulers of Babylon from the 7th to 3rd centuries BC. In this list, the rule of Darius III (r. 336–330 BC), the last Achaemenid king, is immediately preceded by a fragmentary reference to Nidin-Bel.

Scholars are divided in how the reference is best interpreted. Several researchers do consider it possible that Nidin-Bel was a historical Babylonian rebel, revolting against Darius III in the chaotic aftermath of Artaxerxes IV's (Darius III's predecessor) fall from power and assassination. If he was a real king, the Uruk King List indicates that Nidin-Bel was a regnal name, possibly assumed by the king to honour the preceding Nebuchadnezzar III, a Babylonian rebel who revolted against the Persians in the 6th century BC. Before assuming the regnal name Nebuchadnezzar, Nebuchadnezzar III's original name was Nidintu-Bêl. The lack of references to Nidin-Bel outside of the Uruk King List might be due to his revolt being defeated quickly by Darius III.

Some researchers dispute the existence of a Babylonian rebel in the 4th century BC. It has been suggested that Nidin-Bel was the regnal name of Artaxerxes IV in Babylonia but this seems unlikely as no other Mesopotamian documents refer to Artaxerxes by that name and due to the name being similar to Nidintu-Bêl, the name of a rebel and pretender. It is also possible that the name is a scribal error, intended to refer to Nebuchadnezzar III but misplaced in the chronology of kings by the scribes that made the list. It is possible that another tablet, the Alexander Chronicle, also references Nidin-Bel, but the relevant line of text is badly damaged.

== Background ==
The Neo-Babylonian Empire, the last great Mesopotamian empire to be ruled by monarchs native to Mesopotamia itself and the final and most spectacular era in Babylonian history, was ended through the conquest of Babylon by the Persian Achaemenid Empire under Cyrus the Great in 539 BC. After its conquest, Babylon would never again rise to become the single capital of an independent kingdom, much less a great empire. The city, owing to its prestigious and ancient history, continued to be an important site, however, with a large population, defensible walls and a functioning local cult for centuries. Though the city did become one of the Achaemenid Empire's capitals (alongside Pasargadae, Ecbatana and Susa), retaining some importance through not being relegated to just a provincial city, the Persian conquest introduced a ruling class which was not absorbed by the native Babylonian culture, instead maintaining their own additional political centers outside of Mesopotamia. Since the new rulers did not rely on Babylon's significance for their continued rule, the city's prestige had been irreversibly diminished.

Throughout the period of Persian rule over Babylonia, the Babylonians came to resent their new overlords. The Persian kings had capitals elsewhere in their empire, rarely partook in Babylon's traditional rituals (meaning that these rituals could not be celebrated in their traditional form since the presence of the king was typically required) and rarely performed their traditional duties to the Babylonian cults through the construction of temples and giving of cultic gifts to the city's gods. As such, the Babylonians might have interpreted them as failing in their duties as kings and thus not having the necessary divine endorsement to be considered true kings of Babylon. In response to this, Babylon revolted several time against Persian rule in an attempt to regain its independence, though known revolts (with the possible exception of Nidin-Bel's revolt) are restricted to the early Persian period. The Persian king Darius I (r. 522–486 BC) faced the rebellions of Nebuchadnezzar III (522 BC) and Nebuchadnezzar IV (521 BC), both of whom claimed to be sons of Nabonidus, Babylon's last independent king. Darius I's son and successor, Xerxes I (r. 486–465 BC), also faced two Babylonian revolts, two contemporary uprisings in 484 BC led by the rebels Bel-shimanni and Shamash-eriba. The revolts against Xerxes in particular led the Persians to incur retribution on the Babylonians. Notably, Xerxes divided the previously large Babylonian satrapy (before accounting for most of the Neo-Babylonian Empire's territory) into smaller sub-units and enacted some form of targeted revenge on Babylonia's most prominent families, whose preserved archival records all end in 484 BC. According to ancient writers such as the Greek historian Herodotus, Xerxes destroyed Babylon's fortifications and damaged the temples in the city.

== Historical evidence ==
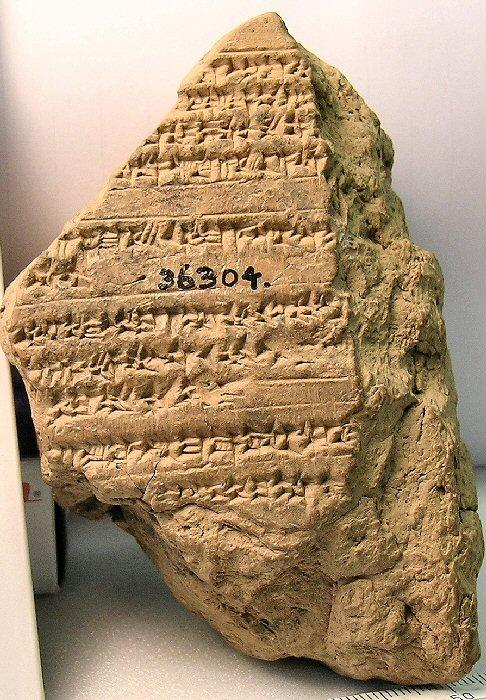
Reverse side of the tablet BCHP 1 (the Alexander Chronicle), which might contain a fragmentary reference to Nidin-Bel.

In ancient Mesopotamia, king lists were used to recount the sequences of kings and record how long each king ruled. Structure and the level of detail (some lists, for instance, provided genealogical information) varied from list to list and purposes were often not only historiographical, but also political. For instance, Assyrian king lists typically recorded the genealogy of the Assyrian kings in great detail as connection to the royal bloodline granted the Assyrian ruler their legitimacy. Though considerably rarer than during previous periods, there are surviving examples of Mesopotamian king lists written in the centuries after the fall of the Neo-Babylonian Empire. The foremost example of a list in regards to the Persian period is the Uruk King List (IM 65066, also known as King List 5), which records rulers of Babylon from Shamash-shum-ukin (r. 668–648 BC) to the Seleucid king Seleucus II Callinicus (r. 246–225 BC). The tablet containing the list is fragmentary; only recording the first three Persian rulers (Cyrus, Cambyses and Darius I) before breaking off, with surviving fragments not resuming until the line that records Darius III (r. 336–330 BC). Darius III's line is immediately preceded by a damaged line of text which can be read as "[... ša M]U šá-nu-ú ^{m}Ni-din-^{d}E[N]", restored and translated as "[royal name] [whose] second name (is) Nidin-^{d}Bêl". The damaged line in the Uruk King List is the only known surviving reference to a king by the name Nidin-Bel.

The tablet BCHP 1 (alternatively BM 36304 or ABC 8, known as the Alexander Chronicle) was written in Babylon during the Hellenistic period (after Alexander the Great's conquest of the Persian Empire) and records events from the reigns of Darius III and Alexander. The tablet is badly damaged, but the fragmentary line 14 (the meaning of which is unclear on account of it being incomplete) ends with "[...]-Bêl, his son, to the office of satrap". Jona Lendering believes that this figure, whose name ended with "-Bêl" might be Nidin-Bel. Names ending in "-Bêl" were not rare in Babylonia, however, with several hundred individuals with the suffix being recorded from the preceding Neo-Babylonian period alone.

== Interpretation and speculation ==
Darius III's predecessor as Persian ruler was Artaxerxes IV (also known as Arses, r. 338–336 BC). Johannes J.A. van Dijk suggested in 1962 that Nidin-Bêl was the regnal name used by Artaxerxes IV in Babylonia, but this hypothesis cannot be substantiated since no other sources in Akkadian refer to him by that name. Several researchers, including A. Leo Oppenheim, Matthew Stolper and Yazdan Safaee have concluded that Nidin-Bêl being the Babylonian regnal name of Artaxerxes is unlikely. Oppenheim noted that it is made especially unlikely since the name closely resembles Nidintu-Bêl, the original name of the 6th-century anti-Persian Babylonian rebel Nebuchadnezzar III.

If Nidin-Bel was not Artaxerxes IV, it is thus possible that he was a native Babylonian rebel. Oppenheim considered it to be "quite possible" that the line in the Uruk King List was "evidence for another Babylonian usurper of Achaemenian rule whose short reign preceded that of Darius III". A. B. Bosworth, author of a 1988 history of the reign of Alexander the Great, wrote that Nidin-Bel being a Babylonian rebel king revolting against Darius III was a "strong possibility". Stolper noted in that it was possible that Nidin-Bel might have been "an otherwise unrecorded local usurper who claimed power in Babylon during the unstable period of the assassinations that brought Darius III to the throne" but also noted that it was possible that Nidin-Bel was the same person as Nebuchadnezzar III, misplaced in the chronology of kings by later scribes. Amélie Kuhrt wrote in 2007 that there was no evidence to support the existence of Nidin-Bel as a rebel during the reign of Darius III and that a scribal error might be a more likely explanation. The rebels from the reign of Darius I, Nebuchadnezzar III and Nebuchadnezzar IV, are conspicuously absent in the Uruk King List; Kuhrt considered it plausible that the name Nidin-Bêl might thus simply have been associated with the wrong Darius by the scribes who made the list. Safaee did not consider this conclusion satisfactory, noting that the lack of evidence of Nidin-Bel beyond the Uruk King List could be attributed to the unstable political situation at the time and that Darius III might have quickly crushed the rebel soon after consolidating his rule, so that no traces of the revolt were left in other sources.

Artaxerxes IV was assassinated in 336 BC, which caused the empire to undergo a period of chaos. This tumultuous transition of power from Artaxerxes IV to Darius III does leave sufficient room for a short-lived Babylonian revolt and there were more well-recorded contemporary uprisings in the Persian Empire; notably, Egypt was in open revolt under Pharaoh Khabash. Darius III himself was originally the satrap of Armenia, gaining the throne after having been in open revolt against Artaxerxes IV. Nidin-Bel's potential rule of Babylon can be dated by the information in the king list. The king lists accords Darius III a reign of five years, which must refer to 335/334–331/330 BC. As Darius III was in control of the city in 335 BC, Nidin-Bel's revolt and brief rule over Babylon, if historical, must have taken place in the autumn of 336 BC and/or in the subsequent winter of 336/335 BC.

As the text of the king list indicates ("whose second name is..."), Nidin-Bêl appears to have been a assumed regnal name and it may be a corrupted or colloquial form of Nidintu-Bêl. If Nidin-Bel was a real Babylonian rebel, he might have assumed the name in honour of Nebuchadnezzar III's anti-Persian rebellion nearly two hundred years prior. Safaee interpreted the name choice as the rebel indicating that he intended to finish the work of his ancient predecessor in overthrowing Persian rule of Babylonia. If this is the case, Nidin-Bel followed in his predecessor's footsteps through choosing a name with historical significance (the original Nidintu-Bêl having chosen the regnal name Nebuchadnezzar).

== Notes ==
Nidin-Bel
Preceded by Artaxerxes IV (Achaemenid Empire)	King of Babylon; 336 BC or 336–335 BC	Succeeded by Darius III (Achaemenid Empire)
