= Babylonian revolts (484 BC) =

Revolts of two rebel kings of Babylon

- Part of the Babylonian revolts against the Persian Empire
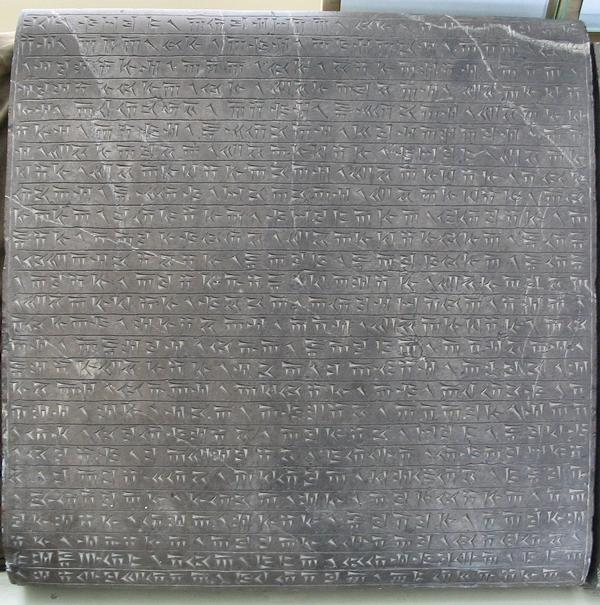
- The Daiva inscription of Xerxes I (c. 480 BC), which records the suppression of a religious revolt somewhere in the Achaemenid Empire. It might be a reference to the revolts of Bel-shimanni and Shamash-eriba.
Date	July – October 484 BC (3 months)
Location	Babylonia
Result	Decisive Achaemenid victory; Babylon and other cities punished; extent of punishment unclear; Division of the large Babylonian satrapy into smaller units; Targeted revenge against supporters of the revolts; Persians encourage local cults in Babylonia to diminish the religious hegemony of Babylon in the region

Belligerents
Babylon; Sippar; Borsippa; Kish; Dilbat; Other Babylonian cities	Achaemenid Empire

Commanders and leaders
Shamash-eriba; Bel-shimanni	Xerxes I

Strength
Unknown	Unknown

The Babylonian revolts of 484 BC were revolts of two rebel kings of Babylon, Bel-shimanni (Akkadian: Bêl-šimânni) and Shamash-eriba (Akkadian: Šamaš-eriba), against Xerxes I, king of the Persian Achaemenid Empire.

Babylonia had been conquered by the Persians in 539 BC, but through the 55 years of Persian rule, the Babylonians had grown dissatisfied with their foreign overlords. Babylon's prestige and significance had diminished as the Persian kings did not become absorbed by the native Babylonian culture and continued to rule from capitals outside of Babylonia. Furthermore, the Persian kings failed in the traditional duties of the Babylonian king in that they rarely partook in Babylon's rituals (which required the presence of a king) and rarely gave cultic gifts in Babylonian temples. Babylonian letters written shortly before the revolt paint a picture of dissatisfaction and concern, as the Persians withdrew the income of Babylonian temple officials without explanation and tax pressures and exploitation of resources increased throughout Babylonia. It is possible that the revolts were not just motivated by a wish to re-establish an independent Babylonian kingdom, but that the revolts also had religious undertones, something which might connect them to a religious uprising somewhere in the Persian Empire written about in Xerxes's inscriptions.

The revolt began in July 484 BC, the fourth month of Xerxes's second year as king. The citizens of Sippar (north of Babylon) proclaimed Shamash-eriba as king of Babylon and he also took for himself the title king of the Lands. In the same month, a second rebel king, Bel-shimanni, was recognised in Borsippa and Dilbat (south of Babylon). Shamash-eriba was still in control of Sippar at this point, which means that the two rebels were contemporaries, either allies or, more likely, rivals. Bel-shimanni's revolt was brief, only lasting about two weeks, most probably either being defeated by Shamash-eriba or willingly giving up his claim and joining with the northern rebel. By September, Shamash-eriba was recognised not only in Sippar and Borsippa, but also in Kish and Babylon itself. The Persians defeated him in October and re-established control of Babylonia.

The extent to which Babylon and the Babylonians were reprimanded by Xerxes is unclear. Traditionally, historians have ascribed widespread destruction to the aftermath of the revolts, with Xerxes supposedly having greatly damaged the temples of Babylon and removing the Statue of Marduk, Babylon's main cult image, from the city. The veracity of such claims is unclear, as no evidence exists whatsoever of any damage being done to the cities of Babylonia in 484 BC. Other forms of retribution are evident from the historical evidence; the text archives of a majority of Babylonia's most prominent families end in 484 BC, suggesting targeted revenge against the supporters of the revolts. Additionally, the Persians appear to have worked on dismantling the religious hegemony Babylon held over Babylonia by encouraging the rise of local cults in other Mesopotamian cities, most notably in Uruk.

== Background ==
The Neo-Babylonian Empire, the last great Mesopotamian empire to be ruled by monarchs native to Mesopotamia itself and the final and most spectacular era in Babylonian history, was ended through the Persian Achaemenid conquest of Babylon under Cyrus the Great in 539 BC. After its conquest, Babylon would never again rise to become the single capital of an independent kingdom, much less a great empire. The city, owing to its prestigious and ancient history, continued to be an important site, however, with a large population, defensible walls and a functioning local cult for centuries. The Babylonians worshipped the gods of the Mesopotamian pantheon and the citizens of Babylon above all others revered the god Marduk, the patron deity of the city. Though worship of Marduk never meant the denial of the existence of the other gods, it has sometimes been compared to monotheism.

Though Babylon did become one of the Achaemenid Empire's capitals (alongside Pasargadae, Ecbatana and Susa), retaining some importance through not being relegated to just a provincial city, the Persian conquest introduced a ruling class which was not absorbed by the native Babylonian culture, instead maintaining their own additional political centers outside of Mesopotamia. Since the new rulers did not rely on Babylon's significance for their continued rule, the city's prestige had been irreversibly diminished.

Although the Persian kings continued to stress Babylon's importance through their titulature, using the royal title king of Babylon and king of the Lands, the Babylonians became less and less enthusiastic in regards to Persian rule as time went on. That the Persians were foreigners probably had very little to do with this resentment; none of the traditional duties and responsibilities (Note: Babylonian kings were expected to establish peace and security, uphold justice, honour civil rights, refrain from unlawful taxation, respect religious traditions and maintain cultic order. Any foreigner sufficiently familiar with the royal customs of Babylonia could become its king, though they might then have required the assistance of the native priesthood and the native scribes.) of the Babylonian kings required them to be ethnically or even culturally Babylonian; many foreign rulers had enjoyed Babylonian support in the past and many native kings had been despised. More important than a king's origin was whether they fulfilled their royal duties in line with established Babylonian royal tradition. The Persian kings had capitals elsewhere in their empire, rarely partook in Babylon's traditional rituals (meaning that these rituals could not be celebrated in their traditional form since the presence of the king was typically required) and rarely performed their traditional duties to the Babylonian cults through the construction of temples and giving of cultic gifts to the city's gods. As such, the Babylonians might have interpreted them as failing in their duties as kings and thus not having the necessary divine endorsement to be considered true kings of Babylon.

Babylon revolted several times against Persian rule in an attempt to regain its independence and the revolts of 484 BC against Xerxes I were not the first time the city rebelled. Xerxes's father and predecessor Darius I (r. 522–486 BC) faced the rebellions of Nebuchadnezzar III (522 BC) and Nebuchadnezzar IV (521 BC), both of whom claimed to be sons of Nabonidus, Babylon's last independent king.

== Historical evidence and chronology ==
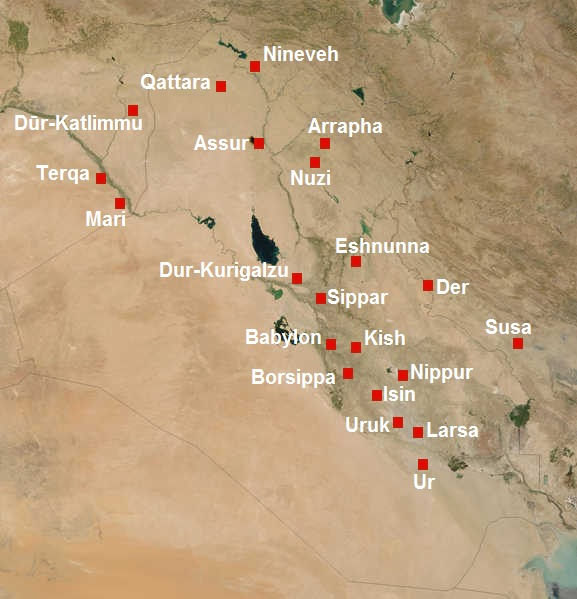
Locations of some major Mesopotamian cities

The Babylonian revolts against Darius are easily dated to 522 and 521 BC due to the number of contemporary sources. The revolts of Nebuchadnezzar III and Nebuchadnezzar IV were part of a wider series of uprisings throughout the Persian Empire due to unrest and dissent following the deaths of Persian rulers Cambyses II and Bardiya. The large number of uprisings were only suppressed by Darius with great difficulty and as a result his victory widely commemorated in texts and monuments.

Although there was contemporary dissent within the Persian Empire in the 480s BC as well, notably an ongoing revolt in Egypt, the resistance against Persian rule was not as widespread as it had been forty years earlier. Perhaps as a result of this, the Babylonian revolts against Xerxes were not as widely commemorated as those against Darius I. There are no known documents or monuments made by Xerxes that speak of his Babylonian victory and no contemporary Babylonian chroniclers recorded the events of the year. No known later Babylonian documents reflect on what transpired either and though a handful of later Greek historians, such as Herodotus, wrote of a Babylonian uprising against Xerxes, they appear to have lacked precise knowledge of the events that transpired and their dates.

In general, evidence in regards to the revolts is sparse and whether all of historical evidence traditionally associated with them is actually related and how it fits together is unclear. The most important evidence are contemporary Babylonian documents that date themselves to the reign of the rebel kings of 484 BC; Bel-shimanni and Shamash-eriba, confirming the existence of the rebels, their names, and their revolt against Persian rule. In addition to these documents, the Daiva inscription by Xerxes, which records the suppression of a religious revolt somewhere in his empire, could be a reference to the revolts, though the inscription does not specify where the revolt took place or who partook in it. Other evidence comes in the form of the works of later Greek and Roman historians. Herodotus wrote that Xerxes captured Babylon after an uprising and removed a statue from the Esagila (Babylon's main temple) as punishment. The Greek historian Ctesias (typically considered unreliable) wrote that Xerxes dealt with two different Babylonian revolts on two separate occasions, the first one being defeated by his general Megabyzus and the second one being defeated by Xerxes himself. The Greco-Roman historian Arrian wrote that Xerxes faced a Babylonian revolt on his way back from Greece in 479 BC and punished the Babylonians for their uprising by closing the Esagila.

As Babylonian tablets do not record years in relation to anything other than the first year of a king, the tablets dated to the reigns of Bel-shimanni and Shamash-eriba do not in of themselves provide enough evidence to determine when their revolts took place. As the tablets are dated to the summer months, one method to determine when the revolts took place would be to examine which of the regnal years of Xerxes are missing tablets dated to the summer. However, several different possibilities are then available as there are no known tablets dated to Xerxes's reign from the summers of 484 BC, 479 BC, 477 BC, 475 BC, 473 BC, 472 BC, 468 BC or 466 BC.

The first attempt to date Bel-shimanni and Shamash-eriba was made by Arthur Ungnad in 1907, who suggested that they had rebelled during the late reign of Darius I or early reign of Xerxes. He based this on the names of the people mentioned in the legal contracts dated to the two rebels, since these figures were also mentioned in legal contracts written during the reigns of Darius and Xerxes. Based on information contained in the tablets recognising Bel-shimanni, Mariano San Nicolò was in 1934 confidently able to pinpoint his reign to Xerxes's second year as king (484 BC).

In 1941, George Glenn Cameron suggested that Shamash-eriba's revolt had taken place in Xerxes's fourth year (482 BC), coinciding with Xerxes supposedly dropping the title king of Babylon. In 1992, Pierre Briant proposed that a better fit would be Xerxes's sixth year (480 BC), since a rebellion in Babylon could help explain why Xerxes mismanaged his ongoing war in Greece. Shamash-eriba's uprising also taking place in 484 BC was not suggested until 2004 by Caroline Waerzeggers, who partly based her date on the archival context of several of the contracts dated to his reign and evidence from previously unpublished cuneiform material. John Oelsner examined her evidence in 2007 and also agreed with 484 BC as the most probable date. Since 2007, 484 BC has been the near-universally accepted date for both revolts. Further evidence examined since then, such as an abrupt end to many Babylonian archives in 484 BC, makes it clear that something remarkable occurred during this year.

== Reconstruction of events ==
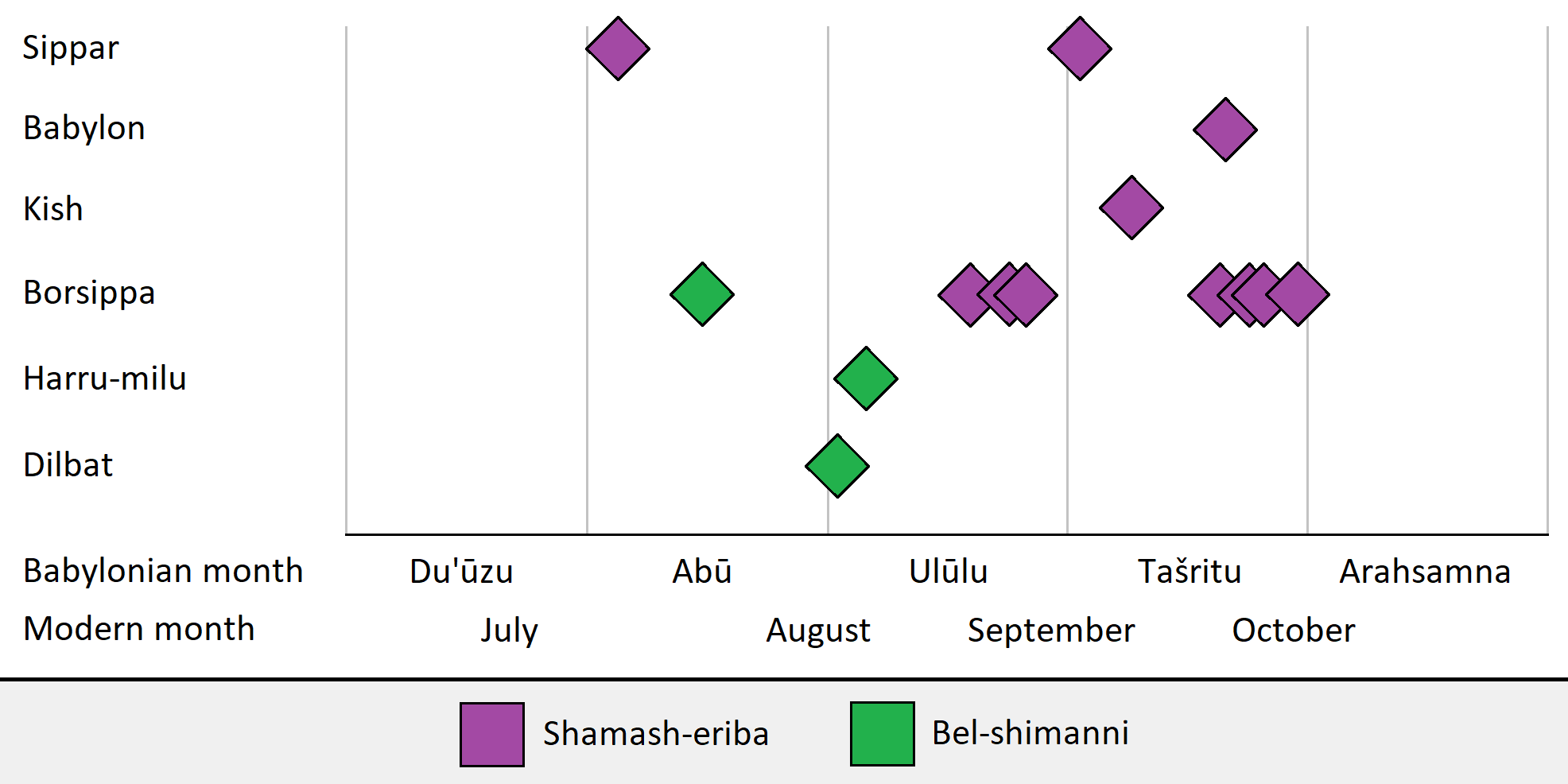
The cuneiform tablets dated to the reigns of Bel-shimanni (green) and Shamash-eriba (purple) and the locations of their discovery presented in a timeline.

Through examination of the cuneiform evidence, it is possible to approximately reconstruct the events of 484 BC. It is apparent that the Babylonians were dissatisfied with Persian rule; preserved letters from the Babylonian city of Borsippa, written shortly before 484 BC, suggest a generally worried atmosphere in the city. The incomes of the city's temple officials had been withdrawn by Persian officials without any explanation. Although it is unclear whether this type of sudden and unexplained interference by imperial authorities was restricted to Borsippa or widespread throughout Babylonia, it might have been what allowed the rebel leaders to gather significant enough support to revolt. In addition to this specific example, tax pressures and a general exploitation of Babylonian resources had gradually increased throughout the reign of Xerxes's predecessor, Darius. As the Babylonian establishment was closely linked to religious matters and the Daiva inscription refers to a religious revolt, it is possible that the Babylonian revolts were religious in nature.

The contents of Babylonian text archives deposited in 484 BC prove the existence of a large interconnected network of urban elites throughout Babylonia prior to the revolts. Texts deposited in the archives of different families and individuals overlap significantly in style and several figures appear in texts from different archives, proving the existence of inter-personal relationships among Babylonia's elites. These archives implicate several figures as supporters of Bel-shimanni's and Shamash-eriba's revolts, including the governor (šākinṭēmi) of Babylon itself, prebendaries of temples in Sippar (with frequently mentioned figures being the archive owners Marduk-rēmanni and Bēl-rēmanni) as well as the powerful Ša-nāšišu family, which controlled the most important religious and civic offices of both Babylon and Sippar in the reign of Darius. Caroline Waerzeggers identified the Ša-nāšišu family in the years leading up to 484 BC as "ideally positioned to facilitate coordinated action".

Though contemporary Babylonian documents offer little in regards to events transpiring at a political stage, they can be used to establish a sequence of events as they allow researchers to determine which cities recognised the rule of Bel-shimanni and Shamash-eriba and on what days their rules were recognised. After the death of Darius, Xerxes's rule was initially accepted in Babylonia, despite mounting unrest in the region and an ongoing revolt in Egypt. In the fourth month of Xerxes's second year as king, July 484 BC, the citizens of the city of Sippar proclaimed Shamash-eriba, of unclear origin, as king. He took the title king of Babylon and of the lands. Shamash-eriba's proclamation as king, though he did not yet control Babylon itself, was the first open act of revolt from the Babylonians since the uprising of Nebuchadnezzar IV in 521 BC. Tablets recognising Bel-shimanni in Borsippa and Dilbat, cities south of Sippar, are known from just ten days after the earliest tablets recognising Shamash-eriba. As most Babylonian names did, the names of both rebels incorporate the names of Mesopotamian deities. Shamash-eriba's name incorporates the deity Shamash, a sun god and the patron deity of Sippar (where Shamash-eriba's rebellion began). Bel-shimanni's name incorporates Bêl, meaning "lord", a common designation for Marduk.

As Shamash-eriba was still recognised by the citizens of Sippar at this point, there was suddenly two contemporary Babylonian rebels. Though both fought against the Persians, Waerzeggers speculated in 2018 that they, as rival claimants, might also have fought against each other. As the ruler of Sippar, Shamash-eriba's revolt initially gained ground in northern Babylonia whereas Bel-shimanni power-base was south of Babylon, in Borsippa and Dilbat. Nothing is known of the background of either of the rebel leaders. Caroline Waerzeggers suggested a number of possibilities in 2018, writing that the most likely possibilities were that they were army officers, local governors or religious leaders. As their names are Babylonian, both were probably native Babylonians.

As tablets dated to the reign of Bel-shimanni only cover a period of about two weeks, it is clear that his reign was terminated through some means and Shamash-eriba later remained as the only contender facing Xerxes. Bel-shimanni might have been defeated by Shamash-eriba or willingly merged his uprising with that of his northern contender. Halfway through September, the cities of Sippar, Babylon, Borsippa and Kish are known to have supported Shamash-eriba's rule. As no documents recognise Shamash-eriba's rule after October, it is likely that the Persians defeated him in that month.

== Aftermath ==
Though the revolts themselves were only brief interruptions of Persian dominion, their aftermath saw large-scale and significant changes to political institutions and society in Babylonia as the Persians cemented their control of the region.

=== Xerxes as a "destroyer of Babylon" ===
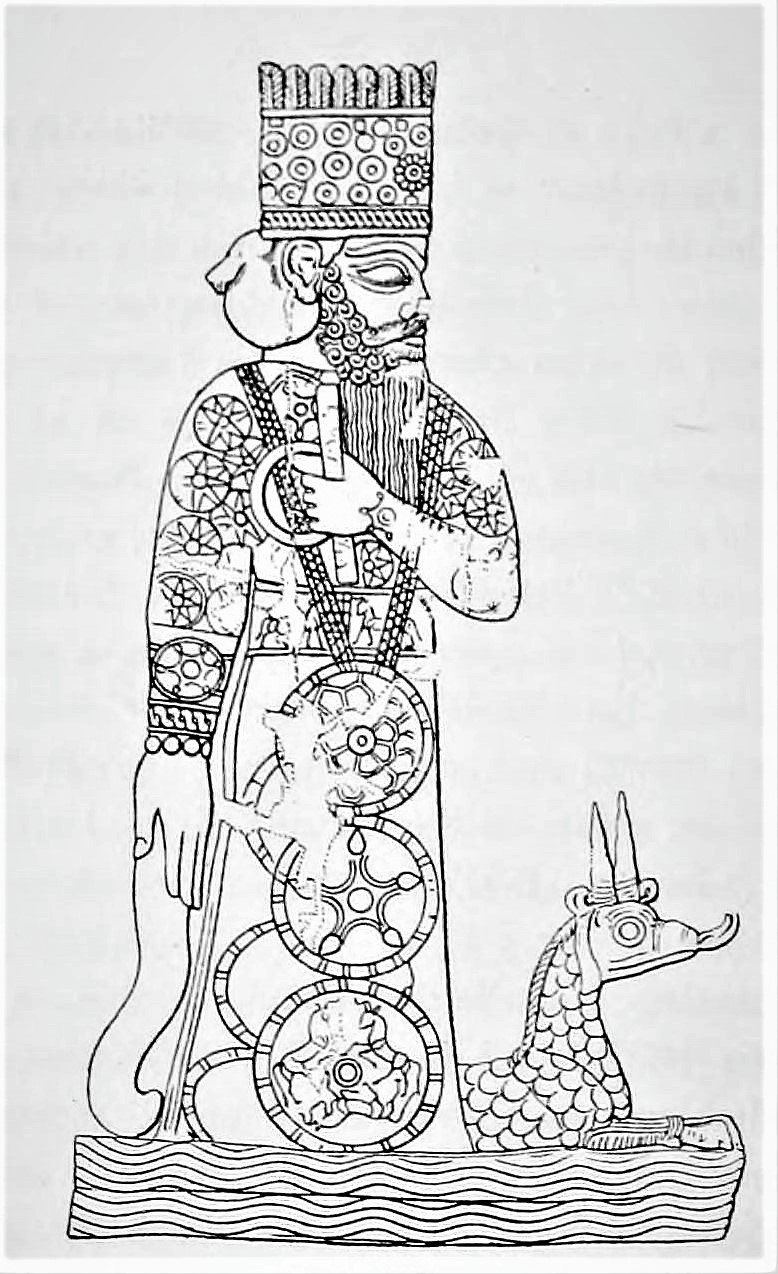
9th century BC depiction from a cylinder seal of the Statue of Marduk, Babylon's patron deity Marduk's main cult image in the city

It is disputed and unclear whether Xerxes's response in Babylonia was measured or violent and what its long-term effects were on Babylonian society. The orthodox view, most clearly expressed by George Glenn Cameron in 1941 and Franz Marius Theodor de Liagre Böhl in 1962, is that Babylon was harshly reprimanded, with Xerxes ruining the city, taking away the Statue of Marduk (Babylon's main cult image of Marduk), which in turn prevented the celebration of Akitu (the Babylonian New Year's festival, which required the statue's presence), splitting the large Babylonian satrapy ("Babylon-and-across-the-River") into two smaller provinces, and removing the title king of Babylon from his royal titulature. Other researchers, such as Hans-Jörg Schmid in 1981, further embellished the details of this supposed retribution, considering it possible the Esagila was destroyed and that the river Euphrates was diverted.

Evidence to support Xerxes unleashing heavy retribution upon Babylon include that Daiva inscription, which supposedly encapsulates Xerxes I's intolerant religious policy, as well as the decreasing number of clay tablets from Babylonia after his reign, perhaps illustrating the region's decline. Other researchers, such as Amélie Kuhrt and Susan Sherwin-White in 1987, consider the ideas forwarded by Böhl and others as being "based on a careless reading of Herodotus combined with incomplete Babylonian evidence and an implicit wish to make very disparate types of material harmonize with a presumed “knowledge” of Xerxes’ actions, policies and character".

The primary evidence that the Statue of Marduk was removed from the Esagila comes from Herodotus, but the relevant passage in his text only reads that the "statue of a man" was removed, with no indication that this is supposed to be the statue of the god. Xerxes cannot be responsible for suspending the Babylonian Akitu festival since the festival had already been suspended for quite some time before Xerxes became king. Furthermore, the title king of Babylon was not abruptly dropped by Xerxes, who continued to use it (albeit less often) in the years after the Babylonian revolts. There is even evidence that Xerxes's successor, Artaxerxes I, used the title at times. The gradual disappearance of the title might reflect the stabilisation of the Persian Empire into a more integrated political unit, rather than some instant punishment against Babylon. Following re-assessments in the 1990s, most modern scholars agree that viewing Xerxes as the "destroyer of Babylonian temples" would be erroneous and based on uncritical misreadings of classical sources alongside an attempt to forcefully fit sparse Babylonian references into the hypothesis.

The lesser number of clay tablets from the reign of Xerxes and later might be attributable not to Persian oppression but to a multitude of other factors, such as accidents, the appearance of new forms of recordkeeping and new writing technologies or the further spread the Aramaic language. The ruins of major cities in Babylonia show no evidence of having suffered any destruction whatsoever in the 480s BC.

=== End of the Babylonian archives ===
The Neo-Babylonian Text Corpus is a collection of documents and texts which document the history of Babylonia under Assyrian, Babylonian and subsequent Persian rule. Two-thirds of the large number of tablets were deposited in a single year, 484 BC. The texts are relatively decentralised and organic in content up until documents written in 484 BC, which are more homogenised and politicised. This suggests widespread support of Bel-shimanni and Shamash-eriba among many of the authors. Caroline Waerzeggers wrote in 2004 that the archives were probably abandoned (or otherwise deposited) in the aftermath of the revolts, possible as the result of Persian intervention as an effect of targeted revenge against those who supported the revolts. Those archives that continue beyond 484 BC were written by local clients of the Persian governing elite in Babylonia, such as managers and caretakers of estates owned by Persian landlords. Many of them were of rural origin, tied to the Persian state through its systems of governance.

In contrast, those whose archives cease in 484 BC were overwhelmingly people who lived in the cities, their ideology not rooted in their relationship to the new Persian overlords but to the political tradition of Babylonia in the form of the country's temples and cities; urban institutions had been established long before the Persian conquest and were run by a small number of families intimately connected through status, education, employment and marriage. Most of the closed archives are from the main rebel centers of 484 BC; Babylon, Borsippa and Sippar, whereas surviving archives are mainly from cities such as Ur, Uruk and Kutha, which may not have supported the uprising. The contrasting origins and status of the people whose archives survived 484 BC and those whose archives did not point to a clear political division between the two groups. Waerzeggers argued in 2004 that the former group represented a pro-Babylonian faction aspiring to overthrow Persian rule whilst the latter represented a pro-Persian faction content with Persian dominion. The end of the archives coincides with the disappearance of elite families with roots in Babylon from southern Babylonia, suggesting that the Persian retribution at least partially focused on dismantling what remained of the pro-Babylonian faction in the aftermath of the revolts. It is probable that repercussions against these individuals was not limited to just closing their archives and probably reflected the removal of previously enjoyed privileges in several areas.

The end of the archives does not appear to have been unexpected for their owners. The most precious and valuable types of tablets, such as property deeds, are not found among the contents of the corpus, the owners probably having taken these with them.

=== Religious reorganisation of Uruk ===
It is unclear whether the city of Uruk supported the 484 BC revolts. No evidence exists that any city in southern Babylonia supported the revolts, but this might be attributable to poor documentation, since it is clear that cities in the south suffered from the effects of Persian retribution in the aftermath of Shamash-eriba's defeat. Evidence from Uruk in particular demonstrates that the city experienced a dramatic series of societal changes in 484 BC.

By 484 BC, a small number of prominent families of Babylonian origin had dominated the local politics of Uruk for generations. These were all driven out from the city after the end of the revolts and replaced with a new group of locals. As noted by Waerzeggers and Karlheinz Kessler in 2004, this shift in the elites of the city had considerable effects on local culture and politics as the new families implemented their own cultural and political programs separate from those of Babylon. Perhaps most dramatically, the city's most prominent place of worship, the Eanna temple, was closed and dismantled; replaced with new temples and new theological leanings distinct from those that had previously been imposed through influence from Babylon. The most prominent of these new temples were the Rēš and the Irigal (or Ešgal), both of which would survive for centuries thereafter.

By this time, Uruk's principal deities were the goddesses Ishtar and Nanaya, typically described in inscriptions as the "owners" of Uruk's primary temples. In the aftermath of the Babylonian defeat, Ishtar and Nanaya were replaced at the top of the local pantheon by the god Anu, with the city's civic religion being reorganised into a nearly hegemonic cult of this god. Evidence for Anu's rise include the shift of naming patterns to names that more frequently incorporate Anu, as well as Anu from 484 BC onwards being described as the owner of Uruk's temples instead of Ishtar and Nanaya.

Anu had been important in Uruk for some time but was also the ancestral head of the Mesopotamian pantheon. His rise to the top of the pantheon at Uruk might have been a symbolic assertion by the city to counter the central religious authority of Babylon. A collection of texts describing the Esagila and rituals dedicated to Anu in Uruk might be an example of the priests of Uruk being influenced by the priests dedicated to Marduk in Babylon, meaning that they might have viewed their new main temple, the Rēš as a counterpart to the Esagila in Babylon. Architecturally, the Rēš was very similar to the Esagila and in cuneiform signs, its name was inscribed as É.SAG, conspicuously similar to the rendering of the Esagila's name, É.SAG.ÍL.

Paul-Alain Beaulieu believes that it is possible that Anu's rise was either imposed or encouraged by the Persians in the aftermath of the defeat of the Babylonian revolts. Persian authorities might have perceived the cult in Uruk as a counterweight to the religious hegemony exerted by Babylon. Encouraging the new elite families of Uruk to create a renewed local civic cult independent of the theology advocated by Babylon might have been a step in working against unity among the Babylonian cities.
