= Nebuchadnezzar III =

King of Babylon during 522 BC

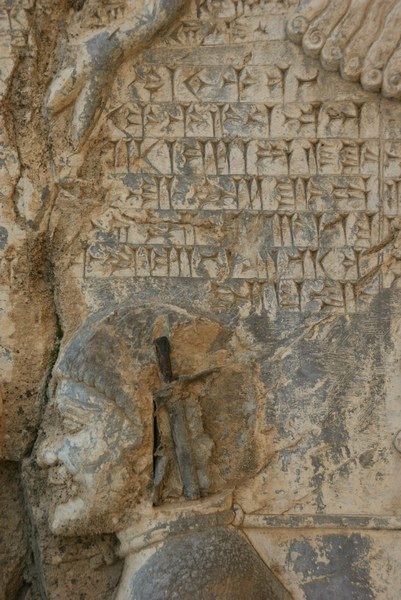
- Nebuchadnezzar III and associated inscription in Darius I's Behistun Inscription (Note: The inscription reads: This is Nidintu-Bêl. He lied, saying "I am Nebuchadnezzar, the son of Nabonidus. I am king of Babylon.")

King of Babylon
- Reign: September/October – December 522 BC
- Coronation: 3 October 522 BC (?)
- Predecessor: Bardiya (Achaemenid Empire)
- Successor: Darius I (Achaemenid Empire)
- Died: December 522 BC; Babylon
- Akkadian: Nabû-kudurri-uṣur
- House: Zazakku (Note: The Zazakku family, a prominent late Babylonian family, should not be confused with the Babylonian office of zazakku (royal scribe).)
- Dynasty: Chaldean dynasty (claimed)
- Father: Mukīn-zēri or Kîn-Zêr (actual); Nabonidus (claimed)

Nebuchadnezzar III (Babylonian cuneiform: Nabû-kudurri-uṣur, meaning "Nabu, watch over my heir", Old Persian: Nabukudracara), alternatively spelled Nebuchadrezzar III and also known by his original name Nidintu-Bêl (Old Persian: Naditabaira or Naditabira), (Note: Nidintu-Bêl means "gift of Bêl".) was a rebel king of Babylon in late 522 BC who attempted to restore Babylonia as an independent kingdom and end the rule of the Persian Achaemenid Empire in Mesopotamia. A Babylonian noble of the Zazakku family and the son of a man by the name of Mukīn-zēri or Kîn-Zêr, Nidintu-Bêl took the regnal name Nebuchadnezzar upon his accession to the Babylonian throne and claimed to be a son of Nabonidus, Babylon's last independent king.

The earliest record of Nebuchadnezzar III is a document mentioning him as the king of Babylon on 3 October 522 BC, possibly the day of his accession to the throne. His revolt had probably originally been aimed at throwing off the rule of the unpopular Persian king Bardiya, but Bardiya had been overthrown by Darius I by the time the revolt began. Nebuchadnezzar III quickly established his rule in Babylonia, seizing control of not only Babylon itself but also the cities of Borsippa, Sippar and Uruk. It is possible that he successfully gained control of all of Babylonia. On 13 December, Nebuchadnezzar III and his army failed to prevent the Persians from crossing the Tigris river and on 18 December, he was decisively defeated in battle near Zazana by the Euphrates river. After this defeat, Nebuchadnezzar III fled to Babylon which was quickly captured by Darius, whereafter Nebuchadnezzar III was executed.

== Background ==
The Neo-Babylonian Empire, the last great Mesopotamian empire to be ruled by monarchs native to Mesopotamia itself and the final and most spectacular era in Babylonian history, was ended through the Persian Achaemenid conquest of Babylon under Cyrus the Great in 539 BC. After its conquest, Babylon would never again rise to become the single capital of an independent kingdom, much less a great empire. The city, owing to its prestigious and ancient history, continued to be an important site, however, with a large population, defensible walls and a functioning local cult for centuries. Though the city did become one of the Achaemenid Empire's capitals (alongside Pasargadae, Ecbatana and Susa), retaining some importance through not being relegated to just a provincial city, the Persian conquest introduced a ruling class which was not absorbed by the native Babylonian culture, instead maintaining their own additional political centers outside of Mesopotamia. Since the new rulers did not rely on Babylon's significance for their continued rule, the city's prestige had been irreversibly diminished.

Although the Persian kings continued to stress Babylon's importance through their titulature, using the royal title King of Babylon and King of the Lands, the Babylonians became less and less enthusiastic in regards to Persian rule as time went on. That the Persians were foreigners probably had very little to do with this resentment; none of the traditional duties and responsibilities (Note: Babylonian kings were expected to establish peace and security, uphold justice, honour civil rights, refrain from unlawful taxation, respect religious traditions and maintain cultic order. Any foreigner sufficiently familiar with the royal customs of Babylonia could become its king, though they might then have required the assistance of the native priesthood and the native scribes.) of the Babylonian kings required them to be ethnically or even culturally Babylonian; many foreign rulers had enjoyed Babylonian support in the past and many native kings had been despised. More important than a king's origin was whether they fulfilled their royal duties in line with established Babylonian royal tradition. The Persian kings had capitals elsewhere in their empire, rarely partook in Babylon's traditional rituals (meaning that these rituals could not be celebrated in their traditional form since the presence of the king was typically required) and rarely performed their traditional duties to the Babylonian cults through the construction of temples and giving of cultic gifts to the city's gods. As such, the Babylonians might have interpreted them as failing in their duties as kings and thus not having the necessary divine endorsement to be considered true kings of Babylon.

== Revolt against the Persians ==
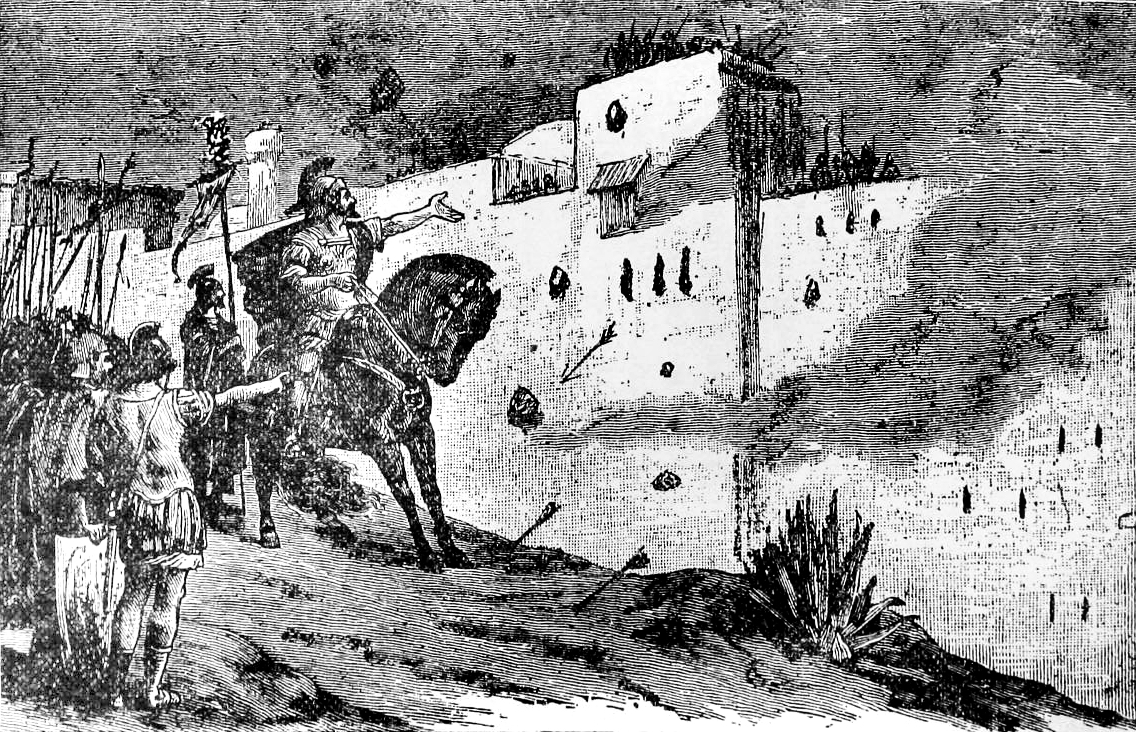
Illustration of Darius I besieging Babylon during the revolt of Nebuchadnezzar III in 522 BC. From the History of Darius the Great (1900) by Jacob Abbott.

Babylon revolted several times against Persian rule and the earliest revolt was that of Nebuchadnezzar III in 522 BC, seventeen years after the Persians conquered the city. All of the Babylonian revolts would see their greatest support come from families involved with the city's priesthood. Nebuchadnezzar III was originally called Nidintu-Bêl and was from the local Zazakku family. His father's name was Mukīn-zēri or Kîn-Zêr. Upon revolting against the Persians, Nidintu-Bēl took the name Nebuchadnezzar and proclaimed himself to be the son of Nabonidus, Babylon's final independent king before the Persian conquest. At the time of the revolt, the Achaemenid Empire was experiencing chaotic political upheaval, with numerous regions of the empire rebelling against the newly crowned Darius I. It is probable that many of the revolts had originally been intended towards Darius I's predecessor, Bardiya, who had been overthrown by Darius.

The earliest record of Nebuchadnezzar III's rule is a cuneiform letter from 3 October 522 BC, possibly the day of his inauguration to the throne, which mentions the letter being written in his first year as king. Nebuchadnezzar might have been old at the time of his accession to the throne, as he is depicted as an old man with a short beard in Darius's Behistun Inscription, which recounts the defeat of Nebuchadnezzar and other rebels.

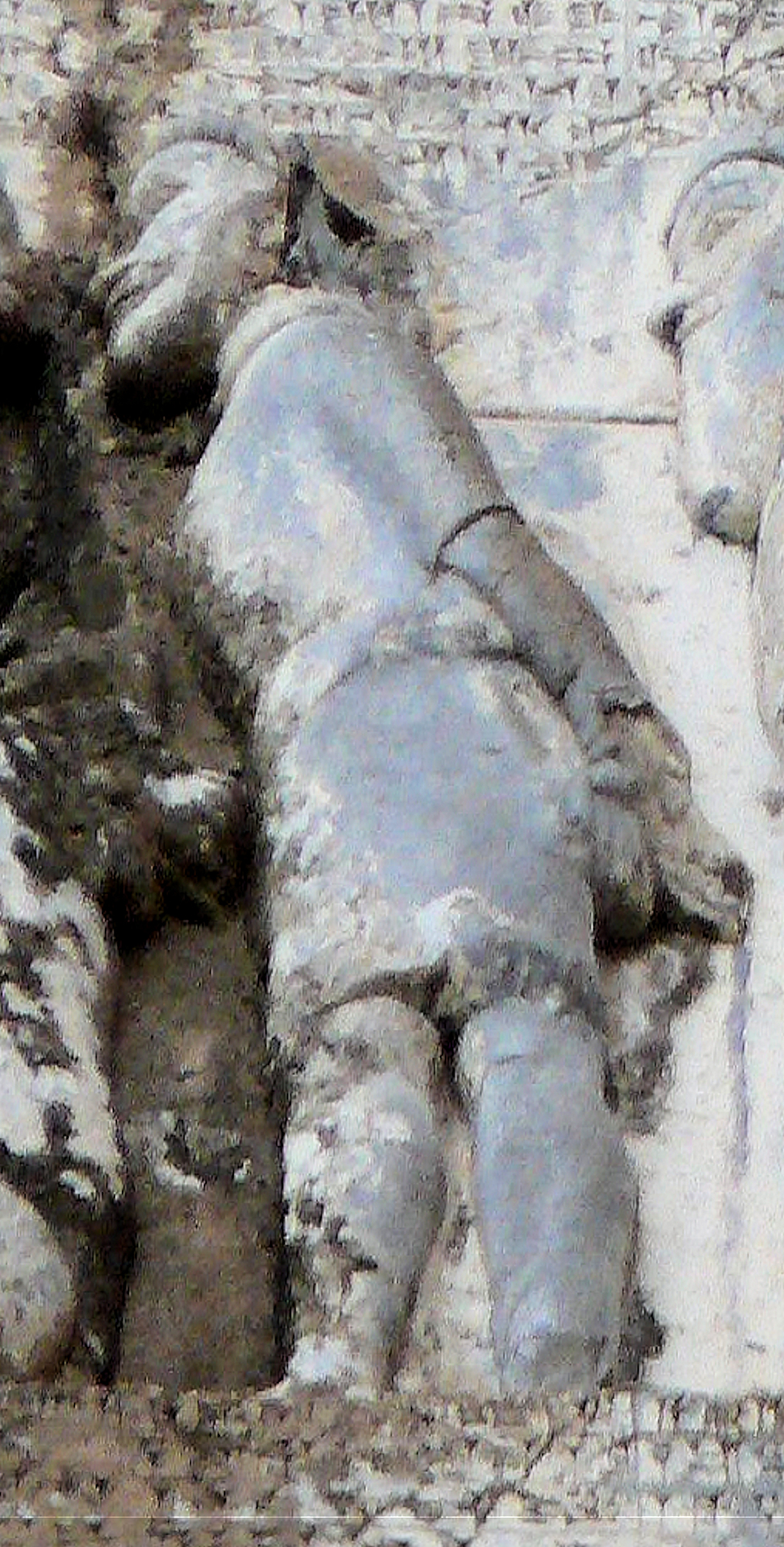
Captured Nebuchadnezzar III in the Behistun inscription.

Nebuchadnezzar sought to make himself the ruler of an autonomous Babylonia and his revolt had probably originally been aimed at throwing off the rule of the unpopular Bardiya. Though Darius's inscriptions state that Nebuchadnezzar revolted in the aftermath of Bardiya's death, his revolt cannot have begun later than 3 October, barely four days after Bardiya had been killed in Media, several hundred kilometres away from Babylon. The letter from 3 October was written at Sippar, sixty kilometres north of Babylon. That Nebuchadnezzar would have been able to instigate a revolt as well as seize Sippar and be recognized there as king within four days after Bardiya's death seems unlikely. The final Babylonian document referring to Bardiya as king is dated to 20 September. Rather than a rebellion in the aftermath of the king's death, the Babylonians had probably prepared their uprising for some time. According to the ancient Greek author Herodotus, they had been preparing throughout Bardiya's brief reign.

Although Darius was quick to move against Nebuchadnezzar, his rule lasted uninterrupted for a few months, at least in Babylon itself and in the cities of Borsippa, Sippar and Uruk. It is possible that Nebuchadnezzar's rule was accepted throughout Babylonia. In early December, Darius's army was nearing the Tigris river, intending to cross it to enter Babylonia. In order to halt the Persian advance, Nebuchadnezzar stationed his troops in the reed thickets of the river, hoping to guard the crossing and seize Darius's boats. On 13 December, the Persians outflanked the rebels by crossing the river on inflated skins and defeated the Babylonian forces stationed by the river.

On 18 December, the Babylonians suffered a decisive defeat in a second battle, which took place near Zazana by the Euphrates river. In the aftermath of the second defeat, Nebuchadnezzar fled back to Babylon with his remaining cavalry. Darius then quickly seized Babylon and Nebuchadnezzar was captured and executed. The earliest known Babylonian tablet which recognises Darius as king of Babylon is dated to 22 December.

== Legacy ==
Less than a year after Nebuchadnezzar III's defeat, the Urartian (Armenian) noble Arakha, son of a man by the name of Haldita, continued Babylonian resistance against the Persians, downplaying his Urartian origin and proclaiming himself as Babylon's king under the name Nebuchadnezzar IV. Through taking the same name as his predecessor, Nebuchadnezzar IV intended to align his own rebellion against the Persians with that of Nebuchadnezzar III. He appealed to Babylon's religious authorities by summoning the statues of the gods of the cities of Uruk and Larsa to Babylon for their protection and notably dated his documents to his first regnal year instead of his accession year, signaling that his revolt was the continuation of Nebuchadnezzar III's uprising. Nearly two hundred years after Nebuchadnezzar III's defeat, in 336/335 BC, another Babylonian rebel, Nidin-Bel, might have taken his regnal name as a tribute to Nebuchadnezzar III (after his original name Nidintu-Bêl).

== Notes ==
Nebuchadnezzar III House of Zazakku Died: 522 BC
Preceded by Bardiya (Achaemenid Empire)	King of Babylon; 522 BC	Succeeded by Darius I (Achaemenid Empire)
