= Zazana =

Susiana (Old Persian: Zâzâna) or Zazana, Zazannu was an ancient Mesopotamian city or town located by the Euphrates river.
