= Nebuchadnezzar IV =

Armenian leader of Babylonian revolt against the Achaemenid Empire (died 521 BC)

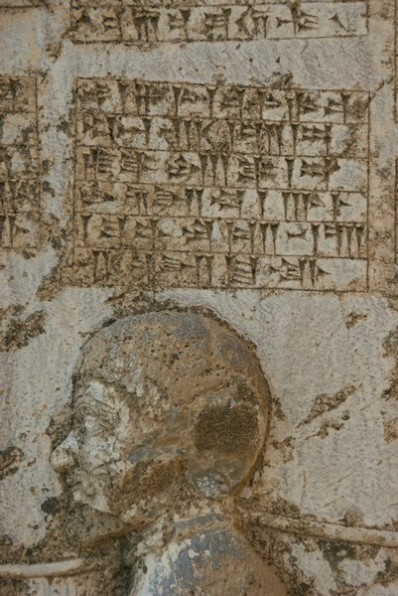
- Nebuchadnezzar IV and associated inscription in Darius I's Behistun Inscription (Note: The inscription reads: This is Arakha. He lied, saying: "I am Nebuchadnezzar, the son of Nabonidus. I am king in Babylon.")

King of Babylon
- Reign: 25 August – 27 November 521 BC
- Predecessor: Darius I (Achaemenid Empire)
- Successor: Darius I (Achaemenid Empire)
- Died: November/December 521 BC; Babylon
- Akkadian: Nabû-kudurri-uṣur
- Dynasty: Chaldean dynasty (claimed)
- Father: Haldita (actual); Nabonidus (claimed)

Nebuchadnezzar IV (Babylonian cuneiform: Nabû-kudurri-uṣur, meaning "Nabu, watch over my heir"; Old Persian: 𐎴𐎲𐎢𐎤𐎢𐎭𐎼𐎨𐎼 Nabukudracara), alternatively spelled Nebuchadrezzar IV and also known by his original name Arakha (Old Persian: 𐎠𐎼𐎧 Araxaʰ), was a nobleman of Urartian descent who in 521 BCE seized power in Babylon, becoming the city's king and leading a revolt against the Persian Achaemenid Empire. His revolt began less than a year after the unsuccessful revolt of Nebuchadnezzar III. Like his predecessor, Arakha assumed the name Nebuchadnezzar and claimed to be a son of Nabonidus, Babylon's last independent king.

Most of the cuneiform tablets recognising the rule of Nebuchadnezzar IV are from Babylon itself, but there are further documents mentioning him from other cities like Uruk and Borsippa and he might have been accepted as king in much of middle and southern Babylonia. Cities in the north, such as Sippar, continued to recognise Persian rule throughout Nebuchadnezzar IV's brief reign. Following a siege of the city by the Persian general Intaphrenes, Babylon was recaptured by the Persians on 27 November 521 BC, whereafter Nebuchadnezzar IV and his supporters were executed.

== Geopolitical background ==
The Neo-Babylonian Empire, the last great king Mesopotamian empire to be ruled by monarchs native to Mesopotamia itself and the final and most spectacular era in Babylonian history, was ended through the Persian Achaemenid conquest of Babylon under Cyrus the Great in 539 BC. After its conquest, Babylon would never again rise to become the single capital of an independent kingdom, much less a great empire. The city, owing to its prestigious and ancient history, continued to be an important site, however, with a large population, defensible walls and a functioning local cult for centuries. Though the city did become one of the Achaemenid Empire's capitals (alongside Pasargadae, Ecbatana and Susa), retaining some importance through not being relegated to just a provincial city, the Persian conquest introduced a ruling class which was not absorbed by the native Babylonian culture, instead maintaining their own additional political centers outside of Mesopotamia. Since the new rulers did not rely on Babylon's significance for their continued rule (partly due to two large uprisings centered within the city- see below), the city's prestige had been irreversibly diminished.

Although the Persian kings continued to stress Babylon's importance through their titulature, using the royal title King of Babylon and King of the Lands, the Babylonians became less and less enthusiastic in regards to Persian rule as time went on. That the Persians were foreigners probably had very little to do with this resentment; none of the traditional duties and responsibilities (Note: Babylonian kings were expected to establish peace and security, uphold justice, honour civil rights, refrain from unlawful taxation, respect religious traditions and maintain cultic order. Any foreigner sufficiently familiar with the royal customs of Babylonia could become its king, though they might then have required the assistance of the native priesthood and the native scribes.) of the Babylonian kings required them to be ethnically or even culturally Babylonian; many foreign rulers had enjoyed Babylonian support in the past and many native kings had been despised. More important than a king's origin was whether they fulfilled their royal duties in line with established Babylonian royal tradition. The Persian kings had capitals elsewhere in their empire, rarely partook in Babylon's traditional rituals (meaning that these rituals could not be celebrated in their traditional form since the presence of the king was typically required) and rarely performed their traditional duties to the Babylonian cults through the construction of temples and giving of cultic gifts to the city's gods. As such, the Babylonians might have interpreted them as failing in their duties as kings and thus not having the necessary divine endorsement to be considered true kings of Babylon.

Babylon would revolt several times against Persian rule, the earliest revolt being the 522 BC revolt of Nebuchadnezzar III, originally named Nidintu-Bēl, who claimed to be a son of Nabonidus, Babylon's final independent king before the Persian conquest. The late 520s BC was a tumultuous time in the Achaemenid Empire, with numerous regions rebelling against the newly crowned Darius I. It is probable that many of the revolts had originally been intended towards Darius I's predecessor, Bardiya (widely accepted to have been an impostor), who had been overthrown by Darius. After failing to prevent the Persians from crossing the Tigris river on 13 December 522 BC, the Babylonians under Nebuchadnezzar III were decisively defeated near Zazana by the Euphrates river on 18 December, whereafter Babylon was captured by Darius and Nebuchadnezzar III was executed.

== Revolt against the Persians ==
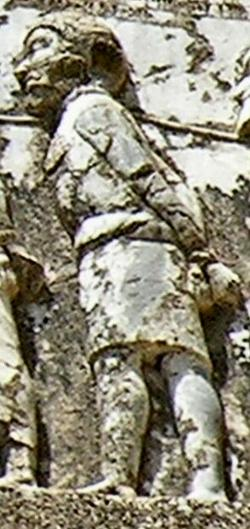
Nebuchadnezzar IV in chains, as depicted in Darius I's Behistun Inscription

Following Nebuchadnezzar III's defeat in December 522 BC, Darius stayed in Babylon for some time, stabilising his rule in the city. Having been recognised as its king from at least 22 December onwards, he stayed in the city until June 521 BC, when he departed for Media and Persia. With Darius absent, Babylon revolted against his rule again on 25 August 521 BC, just two months after he left the city and less than a year after the defeat of Nebuchadnezzar III. The leader of the revolt was Arakha, the son of a man by the name of Haldita and himself not a native Babylonian, but rather a Urartian (Armenian). His father's name referenced Ḫaldi, one of the chief deities of the ancient Urartian kingdom. Persian documents state that Arakha was an Armenian from a region called Dubala.

Like Nebuchadnezzar III before him, Arakha also claimed to be a son of Nabonidus and like his predecessor took the name Nebuchadnezzar. Nebuchadnezzar IV downplayed his Armenian origin and through taking the same regnal name as his predecessor intended to align his own rebellion against the Persians with that of Nebuchadnezzar III. Likewise, considering the name Arakha itself is a term meaning "crown prince" in Armenian, a land outside of Persian rule with ties to Assyria where any remaining children of Nabonidus would have likely fled to, and given the fact that many rulers of this period would often lie on royal engravings such as the Behistun inscription later transcribed by Darius in order to discredit their opponents, there are questions that remain as to the veracity of his self-purported royal parentage.

Documents were dated to his first regnal year, not his accession year, signaling that Nebuchadnezzar IV's uprising was the continuation of the previous Babylonian revolt. This might have been devised by the Babylonian priesthood and the idea might have been to portray Nebuchadnezzar IV as the same person as Nebuchadnezzar III; otherwise the priesthood could have been accused of supporting a wrong pretender less than a year prior. Combining the reigns of the two Nebuchadnezzars into one might also have been seen as a practical solution as it avoided two different consecutive years from both being referred to as the "accession year of Nebuchadnezzar".

According to the inscriptions of Darius, the Babylonians quickly gave their support to Nebuchadnezzar IV. Most cuneiform tablets attributable to Nebuchadnezzar IV's reign have been recovered from Babylon itself, with tablets with contemporary dates from several other Mesopotamian cities, such as Sippar, recognising the rule of Darius instead. American historian Albert T. Olmstead suggested in 1938 that Nebuchadnezzar IV's rule might thus have been restricted to just Babylon itself. Contemporary records, however, write that the revolt began in Ur before spreading north to Babylon, and tablets dated to his reign have also been recovered at Borsippa and Uruk. Other Mesopotamian cities do appear to have accepted his authority in some capacity since he was successful in summoning the statues of the gods of the cities Uruk and Larsa to Babylon for their protection in an effort to appeal to Babylon's religious authorities. It is plausible that he ruled over most of middle and southern Babylonia.

The Babylonian revolt was defeated by Darius's bow carrier, Intaphrenes, on 27 November 521 BC. The lesser extent of Nebuchadnezzar IV's rule compared to that of the preceding Nebuchadnezzar III probably accounts for why Darius thought it sufficient to send one of his generals instead of leading a campaign against the rebel himself. Shortly after being captured by Intaphrenes, Nebuchadnezzar IV was killed on Darius's orders. Conflicting accounts describe Nebuchadnezzar IV as either being crucified or impaled. The Babylonian nobles who had supported the revolt, numbering 2,497 according to Persian sources, were killed alongside him.

== Legacy ==
The ancient Greek historian Herodotus describes a long siege of Babylon by Darius being resolved through a ruse, involving self-mutilation by the general Zopyrus, and the city's gates and walls being destroyed as retribution. Chronological and historical details of Herodotus's account makes it impossible to reconcile with either of the two Babylonian revolts against Darius (notably, both sieges of the city were short and Darius was only present on one of them), though a reference to Darius impaling 3,000 prominent Babylonian citizens might be a reference to the fate of Nebuchadnezzar IV and his supporters.

== Notes ==
Nebuchadnezzar IV Died: 521 BC
Preceded by Darius I (Achaemenid Empire)	King of Babylon; 521 BC	Succeeded by Darius I (Achaemenid Empire)
