= Mar-biti-ahhe-iddina =

Mār-bῑti-aḫḫē-idinna
- King of Babylon
- Reign: c. 939–? BC
- Predecessor: Ninurta-kudurrῑ-uṣur II
- Successor: Šamaš-mudammiq
- House: Dynasty of E (mixed dynasties)

Mār-bῑti-aḫḫē-idinna, ^{md}Mār-bῑti-áḫḫē-idinna (^{md}DUMU-E-PAP-AŠ), (Note: Synchronistic King List Fragments (KAV 10) ii 5 and (KAV 182) iii 8.) meaning Mār-bīti (a Babylonian god with a sanctuary at Borsippa) has given me brothers, became king of Babylonia c. 939 BC, succeeding his brother, Ninurta-kudurrῑ-uṣur II, and was the 3rd king of the Dynasty of E to sit on the throne. He is known only from king lists, a brief mention in a chronicle and as a witness on a kudurru from his father, Nabû-mukin-apli's reign.

== Biography ==
He was first recorded as a witness to a title deed inscribed on a kudurru (Note: Kudurru BM 90835, BBSt 9.) after his (presumably) older brothers, Ninurta-kudurrῑ-uṣur, who was to become his immediate predecessor on the throne, and Rīmūt-ilī, the temple administrator. The Eclectic Chronicle (Note: Eclectic Chronicle (ABC 24), BM 27859: r 1.) refers laconically to “the Nth year of Mār-bῑti-aḫḫē-idinna” but the context is lost. The Synchronistic King List (Note: Synchronistic King List, Ass. 14616c, iii 11.) records him as the third in a series of kings of Babylon who were contemporary with the Assyrian king, Tukultī-apil-Ešarra II (ca. 967–935 BC), the son of Ashur-resh-ishi II and this is quite plausible based on the chronology.

Mār-bῑti-aḫḫē-idinna's reign may have ended considerably earlier than 920 BC but it was the accession of Adad-nārārī I of Assyria around 911 BC that marks the resumption of records of their Babylonian counterparts, with his apparent successor Šamaš-mudammiq, no evidence of their filiation or of any intervening rulers being known.
