= Ninurta-kudurri-usur II =

Ninurta-kudurrῑ-uṣur II
- King of Babylon
- Reign: c. 939 BC
- Predecessor: Nabû-mukin-apli
- Successor: Mār-bῑti-aḫḫē-idinna
- House: Dynasty of E (mixed dynasties)

Ninurta-kudurrῑ-uṣur II, a name meaning “O Ninurta, protect my offspring”, inscribed in cuneiform as ^{md}MAŠ-NÍG.DU-PAP, (Note: Synchronistic King List fragments VAT 11261 (KAV 10) ii 4’ and VAT 11261 (KAV 182) iii 7’.) or ^{md}NIN.IB-NÍG.DU-PAP, (Note: Kudurru BM 90835, BBSt 9, in the British Museum, iv A 30) c. 939 BC, was the 2nd king of the Dynasty of E, a sequence of mixed dynasties, of Babylon; he reigned for 8 months 12 days, according to the King List A. (Note: King List A, BM 33332, iii 16: ITI 8 12 [UD].) No contemporary documents survive for his reign or that of his successor, his younger brother, Mār-bῑti-aḫḫē-idinna.

== Biography ==
He succeeded his long-reigning father, Nabû-mukin-apli, during whose time he appeared as a witness on a kudurru recording a title deed, dated to either his father's 23rd or 25th year, more than a decade before he ascended the throne, suggesting he was fairly elderly when he became king. The dynastic affiliation of the family is unknown and all three members of the family are recorded as the successive contemporaries of the Assyrian king Tiglath-Pileser II. (Note: Synchronistic King List, Ass. 14616c (KAV 216) iii 10.) Two inscriptions on Lorestān bronze arrowheads are inscribed with the name “Ninurta-kudurrῑ-uṣur” are generally ascribed to the earlier, similarly obscure monarch, Ninurta-kudurrῑ-uṣur I, ca. 987 – 985 BC, to whom Brinkman suggests a possible filiation such as grandfather, while a third possession inscription gives his title as Prince (A LU.GAL) and is thought likely to be this individual, although in fact each of them could refer to either monarch.

The Religious Chronicle (Note: Religious Chronicle (ABC 17), BM 35968.) may have been written during his reign, as it ends with events relating to the reign of his father although the only copy that we have is written in the Neo-Babylonian script and is consequently late. His reign was possibly too insignificant to warrant mention in the Eclectic Chronicle.
