= Eclectic Chronicle =

Ancient account of the highlights of Babylonian history

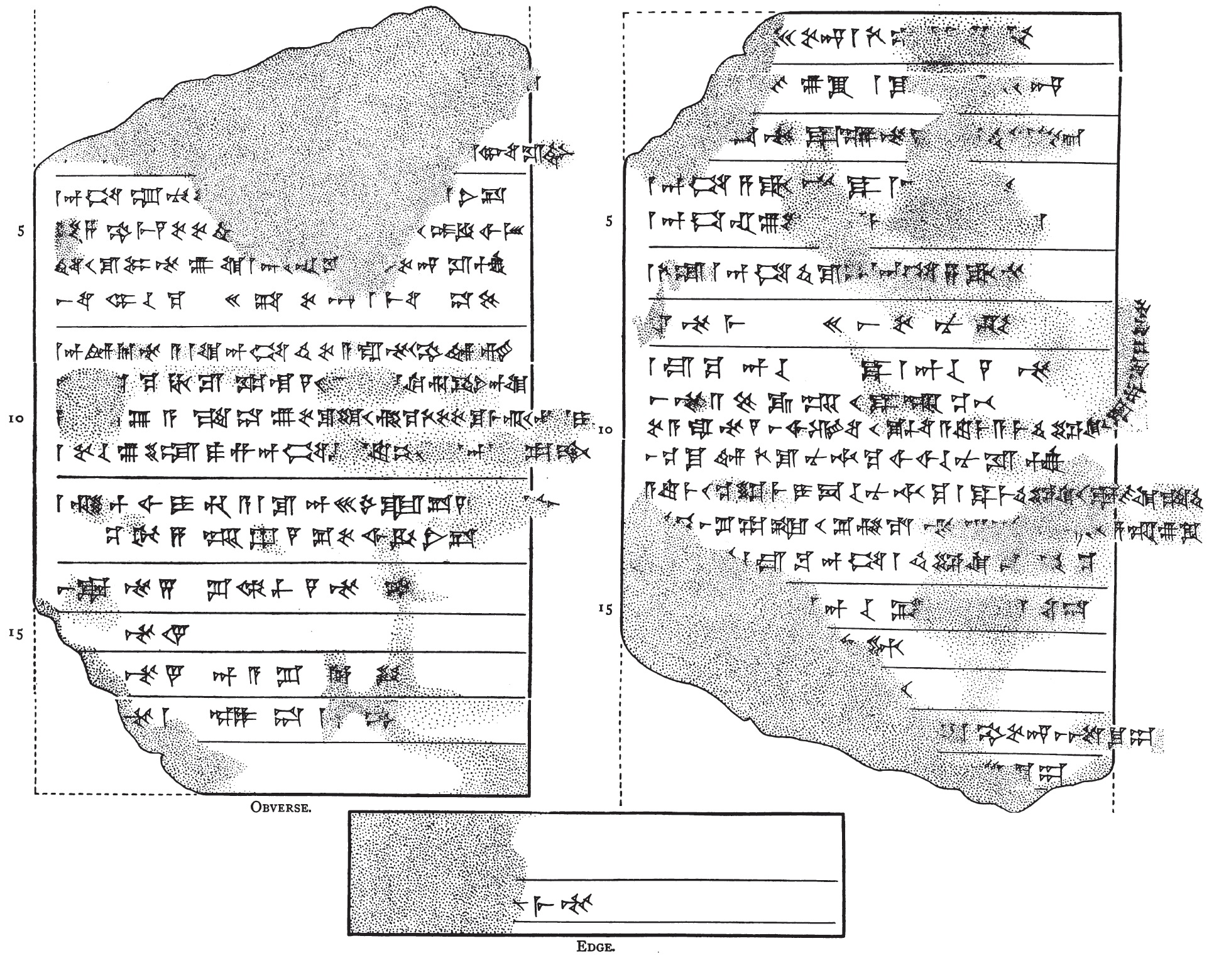
- L. W. King's line-art for the Eclectic Chronicle
- Created: c. 705 BC
- Discovered: before 1899
- Present location: London, England, United Kingdom
- Language: Akkadian

The Eclectic Chronicle, referred to in earlier literature as the New Babylonian Chronicle, is an ancient Mesopotamian account of the highlights of Babylonian history during the post-Kassite era prior to the 689 BC fall of the city of Babylon. It is an important source of historiography from the period of the early iron-age dark-age with few extant sources to support its telling of events.

== The text ==
Although its provenance is unknown, it is thought to originate from Babylon itself as it is written in standard Babylonian in the late cuneiform script of the region. It was acquired by the British Museum in 1898 and given the accession number 98,0711.124, subsequently the Museum reference BM 27859. Approximately two-thirds of the text has survived with the top part of the tablet broken off, losing the beginning and end of the narrative. The work is written in a single column on a small tablet in the format of an administrative or economic text, suggesting it was for private use, in marked contrast to the official histories that were typically inscribed in two or more columns on a much larger object.

In many respects, this chronicle shares the characteristics of Chronicle P, as an episodic and laconic summary of the significant events of Babylonian history, but without the errors of that other work. It seems to have been a continuation, covering the post-Kassite period beginning prior to the reign of Marduk-šāpik-zēri (c. 1082–1069 BC) through to sometime after that of Salmānu-ašarid V (727–722 BC).

The narrative is divided into twenty two extant sections, each focusing on the events of the reign of a different Babylonian monarch (listed below) in chronological order with only a small number of omissions:

1. "He carried off a great booty", he presumably being Marduk-nādin-aḫḫē or Assyrian king Tukultī-apil-Ešarra I, both of whom successfully raided one another's territory
2. Marduk-šāpik-zēri - prosperous reign - this section is duplicated in the Walker Chronicle
3. Adad-apla-iddina - Arameans and Suteans despoil the land - also duplicated in the Walker Chronicle
  (three reigns are skipped)
4. Simbar-Šipak - makes throne of Enlil at Ekur-igigal
  (two insignificant successors were ignored)
5. Eulmaš-šākin-šumi - event not preserved
6. 14th year of an unnamed king, probably Eulmaš-šākin-šumi, when the Dynastic Chronicle relates he died and was succeeded by Ninurta-kudurrῑ-uṣur I - event not preserved
  (next king is omitted)
7. Mār-bīti-apla-uṣur - event not preserved
8. Nabû-mukin-apli - event not preserved
9. nth year, presumably of Ninurta-kudurrῑ-uṣur II, although this king only served eight months - event not preserved
10. Mār-bῑti-aḫḫē-idinna - event not preserved
11. Šamaš-mudammiq - Adad-nirari II was king of Assyria
12. Nabû-šuma-ukin I - Tukulti-Ninurta II was king of Assyria
13. Nabû-apla-iddina - Aššur-nāṣir-apli II was king of Assyria
14. Marduk-zâkir-šumi I - Salmānu-ašarēdu III was king of Assyria
15. Marduk-balāssu-iqbi - event not preserved
  (following king omitted)
16. "For n years there was no king in the land."
  (next three kings are omitted)
17. Erība-Marduk - Aramaeans get their comeuppance
18. Erība-Marduk is honored with a second section - event not preserved
  (following reign was skipped)
19. Nabû-nāṣir - event not preserved
20. ? A section which could have been occupied by any of Nabû-nāṣir's three successors - event not preserved
21. Tukultī-apil-Ešarra III - ascended the throne (of Babylon)
22. Salmānu-ašarid V - ascended the throne (of Babylon)
  (lacuna)

=== Principal publications ===
- L. W. King (1907). Chronicles Concerning Early Babylonian Kings, Vol. II: Texts and Translations. Luzac & Co. pp. 57–69, 147–155.
- A.K. Grayson (1975). Assyrian and Babylonian Chronicles. J. J. Augustin. pp. 180–183.
- Jean-Jacques Glassner (2004). Mesopotamian Chronicles. Society of Biblical Literature. pp. 184–187.

== See also ==
- Chronology of the ancient Near East
