= Shalmaneser II =

- King of Assyria

King of the Middle Assyrian Empire
- Reign: 1031–1019 BC
- Predecessor: Ashurnasirpal I
- Successor: Ashur-nirari IV
- Issue: Ashur-nirari IV
- Father: Ashurnasirpal I

Shalmaneser II (Salmānu-ašarēd II, inscribed ^{md}SILIM-ma-nu-MAŠ/SAG, meaning "Being peaceful is foremost") was the king of Assyria in 1030–1019 BC, the 93rd to appear on the Khorsabad copy (Note: Khorsabad King List, tablet IM 60017 (excavation nos.: DS 828, DS 32-54), iv 6-7.) of the Assyrian king list although he has been apparently carelessly omitted altogether on the Nassouhi copy. (Note: Nassouhi King List, Istanbul A. 116 (Assur 8836).)

== Biography ==
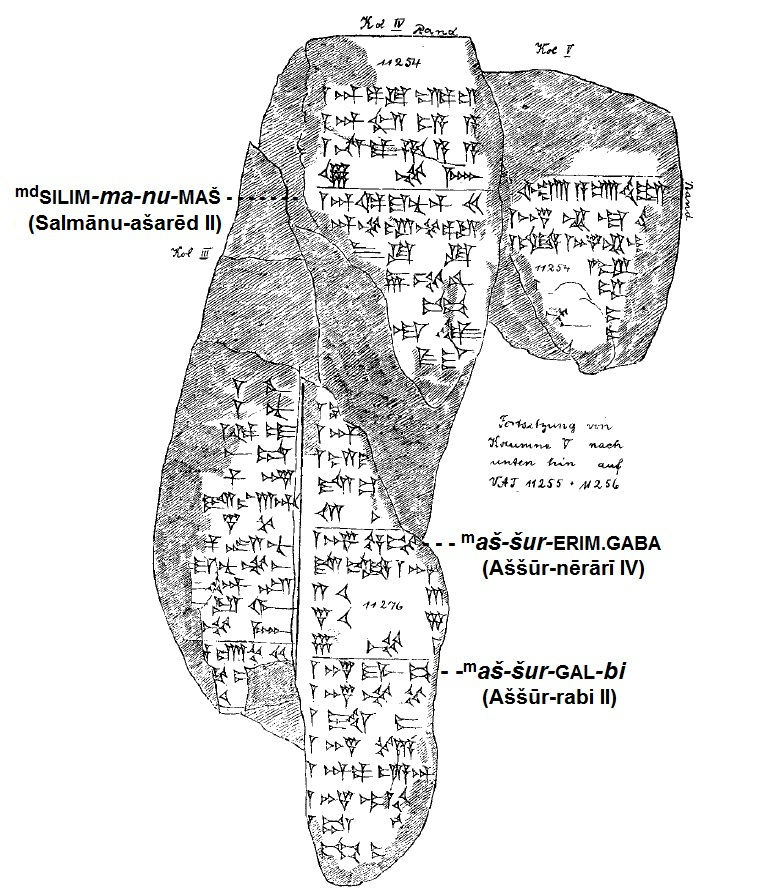
Schroeder’s line art for the KAV 21 list of Eponyms showing the twelve years of Shalmaneser II and his immediate successors. (Note: Eponym List KAV 21, tablet VAT 11254, iv.)

In recent years, there has been a trend towards reading the SILIM in his name as sal rather than šul on philological grounds. He succeeded his father, Aššur-nāṣir-apli I, and ruled for 12 years according to the Assyrian king list and confirmed by a heavily damaged fragment of an eponym list (pictured). Of the twelve limmu officials listed, only the names of the first two have been substantially preserved, that of Shalmaneser himself, who took the eponymy in his first year, and MU.ŠID-mu-šab-[ši]. The twelfth entry ša ar[ki si...] indicates that the limmu "which is after" (the previous name) either suggesting that the original from which this list was copied was defective in this place or the gap in the office coincides with a period of turbulence.

In the Synchronistic King List (Note: Synchronistic Kingliest, tablet excavation no. Ass 14616c, first publication KAV 216.) he is listed beside his Babylonian counterpart, Eulmash-shakin-shumi (1004–988 BC) of the Bῑt-Bazi dynasty, an unlikely pairing reflecting perhaps the isolation of the two kingdoms at the time. In all likelihood, he reigned concurrently with Nabu-shum-libur (1033–1026 BC) and Simbar-shipak (1025–1008 BC), whose reigns were characterized by droughts, crop failures and incursions by Arameans, migrating under the pressure from climate change. The later king, Aššur-dān II (935–912 BC), recalled Shalmaneser 's own losses to this tribal group:

[...who] from the time of Shalmaneser, king of [Assyria, my forefather], had destroyed [people of Assyria by …] and murder, had sold [all] their [sons (and) daughters].

Another retrospective reference can probably be found in an inscription of Ashurnasirpal II unless it refers to the earlier king by this name. It relates "I repossessed the cities of Sinabu (and) Tidu—fortresses which Salmānu-ašarēd, king of Assyria, a prince who preceded me, had garrisoned against the land of Nairi (and) which the Arameans had captured by force."

There are few inscriptions which may be attributed for certainty to him as several may belong to the Shalmaneser I who preceded him, or to one of the three who followed. Of those that can be reliably attributed, a monumental stele (number 14) from Aššur, from the Stelenreihe, "row of stelae," provides his genealogy thus permitting identification but nothing else. It reads: "Shalmaneser, great king, king of the universe, king of Assyria, son of Aššur-nāṣir-apli (I), king of Assyria, son of Šamši-adad (IV), who was also king of Assyria". A temple endowment (Note: Temple endowment, KAV 78.) lists quantities of cedar balsam (dam erêni) donated by the king to the Assurtemple and its "temples" and includes the provision of a quantity of aromatics to Idiglat, the deified river Tigris. There is a long dedication inscription of Shalmaneser, II or III undetermined, to Ištar composed for the consecration of a temple. (Note: KAR 98.) A gold and a silver disk are inscribed with the name "Salmānu-ašarēd" and could possibly represent this king or his predecessor.

He was succeeded by his son, the briefly reigning Ashur-nirari IV, and then his brother Ashur-rabi II.

== Inscriptions ==
Preceded by Ashurnasirpal I	King of Assyria; 1031–1019 BC	Succeeded by Ashur-nirari IV
