= White Obelisk =

Ancient Assyrian stone monolith

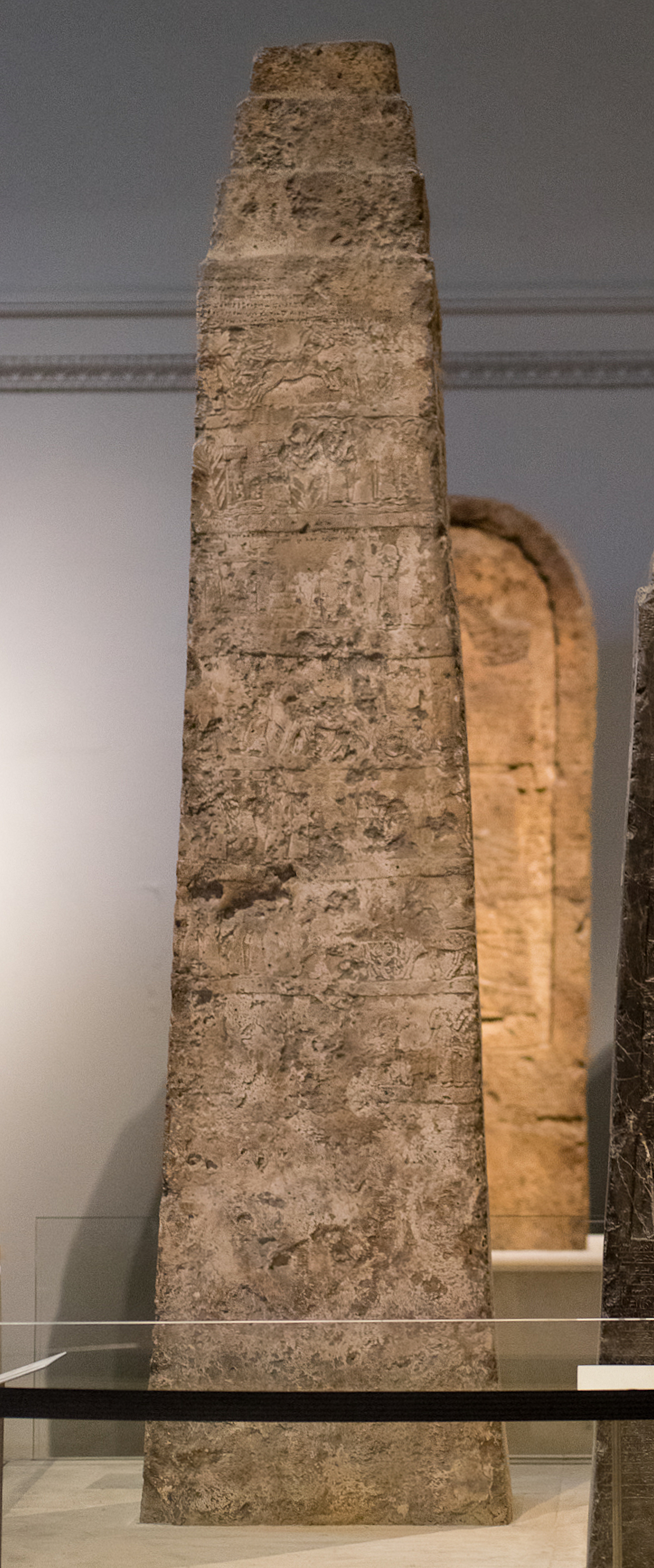
- White Obelisk on display in the British Museum
- Material: Limestone
- Size: Height 284 cm, Width 48 cm
- Created: 1050–1031 BC
- Discovered: Nineveh, Ottoman Iraq
- Present location: British Museum, London
- Registration: ME 118807

The White Obelisk is a large stone monolith found at the ancient Assyrian settlement of Nineveh, northern Iraq. Excavated by the British Assyrian archaeologist Hormuzd Rassam in 1853, it is one of only two intact obelisks to survive from the Assyrian empire, the other being the Black Obelisk of Shalmaneser III. Both are now preserved in the British Museum. The White Obelisk dates to the beginning of the Neo-Assyrian Empire and has been variously ascribed to the reigns of Ashurnasirpal I (c. 1040 BC), Tiglath-Pileser II (c. 950 BC) or Ashurnasirpal II (c. 870 BC).

== Discovery ==
The obelisk was discovered at Nineveh by the British Assyrian archaeologist Hormuzd Rassam in July 1853. According to the excavator's report, it was found about 60 metres to the northeast of Sennacherib's palace at a depth of about 5 metres below the surface of the mound. It was then shipped to London via Bombay in March 1854, arriving in the British capital in February 1855, where it was immediately deposited in the national collection.

== Description ==
The White Obelisk is a very large four-sided pillar made from white limestone with engraved decoration in relief on all sides of the obelisk, with an inscription at the top. The carvings show campaigns and recreational activities (including a hunt) of an Assyrian king that has been identified as either Ashurnasirpal I, Tiglath-Pileser II or Ashurnasirpal II. According to Julian Reade, the style of dress suggests that this impressive stela was set up under the reign of Ashurnasirpal I, since many courtiers wear a Fez-like hat, which is only known from sculptural work made in the thirteenth century BC. If this is the case, the White Obelisk is one of the earliest representations of Assyrian art in existence.

== Inscription and reliefs ==
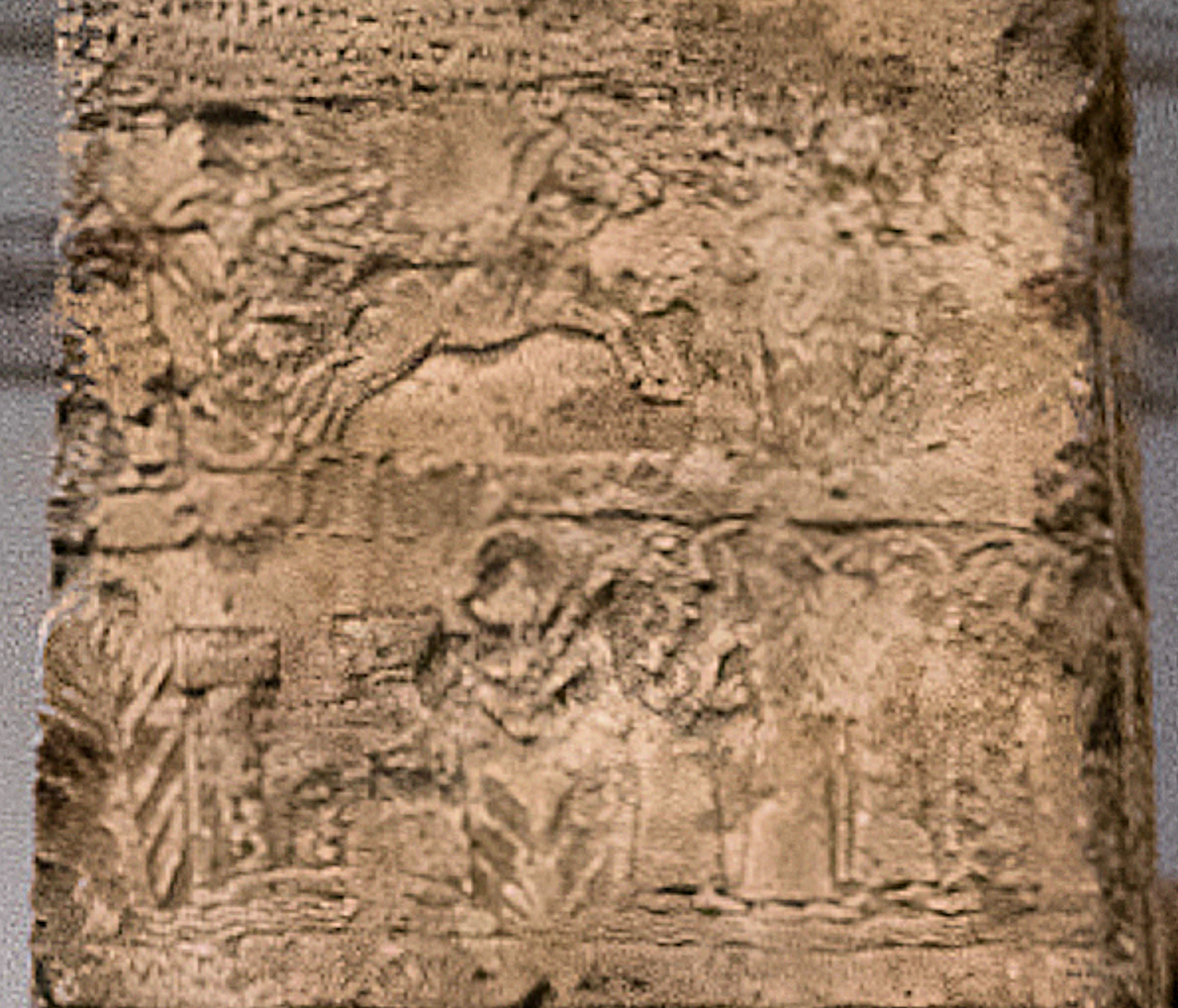
Detail of battle scenes.

The preserved part of the inscription at the top of the obelisk describes the Assyrian king as a great conqueror, taking booty, prisoners and herds of animals to the city of Assur. On each of the four sides of the obelisk are eight rows of panels with relief representations. Engraved on them are various scenes including military expeditions of the king, the monarch receiving tribute, great banquets of courtiers and the hunting of wild animals. One set of religious scenes is accompanied by an inscription, which explains that the scene depicts the king pouring a libation in front of the goddess Ishtar, who was the principal deity of Nineveh.

== See also ==
- Black Obelisk of Shalmaneser III

== Bibliography ==
- Collon, Dominique (1995). Ancient Near Eastern Art. University of California Press. p. 117. ISBN 9780520203075.
- Roaf, Michael (1990). Cultural Atlas of Mesopotamia and the Ancient Near East. Facts on File. ISBN 9780816022182.
- Reade, J. E. (1975). "Aššurnaṣirpal I and the White Obelisk". Iraq. 37 (2): 129–150. doi:10.2307/4200012. JSTOR 4200012. S2CID 163342798.
- Reade, Julian (1983). Assyrian Sculpture Julian Reade, British Museum. British Museum Publications. ISBN 9780714120201.
