= Tiglath-Pileser =

Tiglath-Pileser (or Tiglath-pileser may refer to:

- Tiglath-Pileser I, king of Assyria from 1115 to 1077 BC
- Tiglath-Pileser II, king of Assyria from 967 to 935 BC
- Tiglath-Pileser III, king of Assyria from 745 to 727 BC, also known as Tiglath-Pileser IV
- Tiglath-Pileser, the cat in Agatha Christie's A Murder Is Announced
