= Ashur-resh-ishi II =

- King of Assyria

King of the Middle Assyrian Empire
- Reign: 972–967 BC
- Predecessor: Ashur-rabi II
- Successor: Tiglath-Pileser II
- Issue: Tiglath-Pileser II
- Father: Ashur-rabi II

Aššūr-reš-iši II, inscribed ^{m}aš-šur-SAG-i-ši, meaning "(the god) Aššur has lifted my head," was the king of Assyria, 971–967 BC, the 96th to be listed on the Assyrian Kinglist. (Note: Khorsabad Kinglist, tablet IM 60017 (excavation nos.: DS 828, DS 32-54), iv 10, 12.) (Note: Nassouhi Kinglist, Istanbul A. 116 (Assur 8836), iv 25, 27.) His short five-year reign is rather poorly attested and somewhat overshadowed by the lengthy reigns of his predecessor, Aššur-rabi II, and successor, Tukultī-apil-Ešarra II.

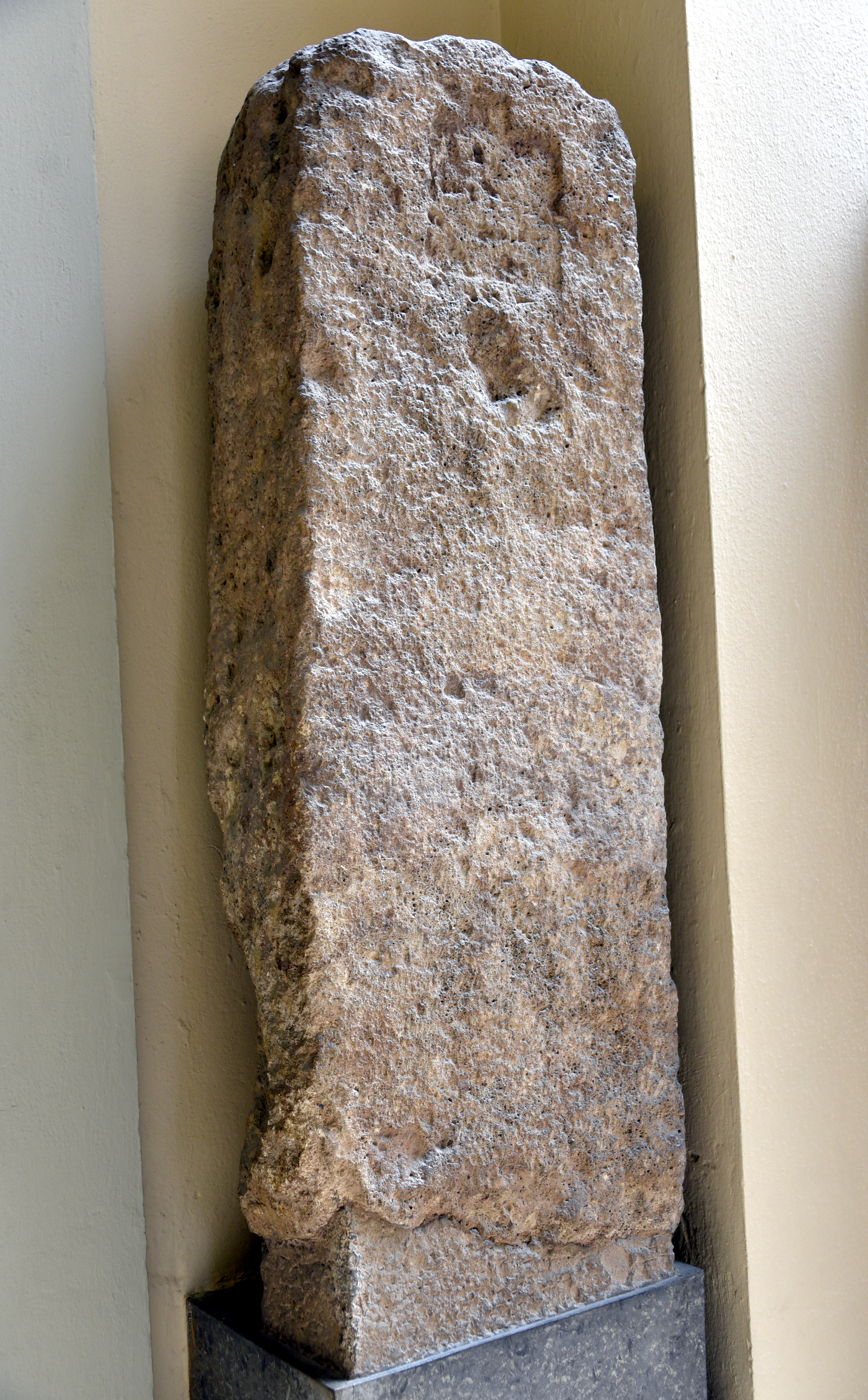
Stele of Ashur-resh-ishi II, from the Row of Stelae (Stelenreihen) at Assur, Iraq. Pergamon Museum

== Biography ==
He succeeded his father, Aššur-rabi II, who had a long 41-year reign. He was probably fairly elderly when the accession took place. He is given in the Synchronistic Kinglist (Note: Synchronistic Kinglist, tablet Ass 14616c (KAV 216), iii 8.) as the counterpart of the Babylonian king Mâr-bîti-apla-uṣur (983-978 BC), the sole member of the 7th or Elamite dynasty of Babylon, although conventional chronology would suggest the subsequent king, Nabû-mukin-apli (978–943 BC), might be a more likely candidate. The part of the eponym list Cc (Note: Eponym List KAV 21, tablet VAT 11254, v.) which would have displayed his limmu officials, was at the top of column V, and is obliterated.

Apart from the references to him in later copies of the Assyrian Kinglists and in the filiation of his grandson, Aššur-dān II, the only contemporary inscriptions referring to him are from his stele (Note: Stele RIMA 2 A.0.96.1 :2.) at the Stelenreihe, "row of stelae," in Aššur and in the cylinder inscription (Note: Cylinder inscription of Bēl-ereš, RIMA 2 A.0.96.2001:16.) of Bēl-ereš. His stele (number 12) is simply inscribed "ṣalam of Aššur-reš-iši, king of Assyria (MAN.KUR aš-šur), son of [A]ššur-[r]abi, king of Assyria," where the term ṣalam is taken to mean "statue." Bēl-eriš, the šangû-priest of the temple of the god Samnuha, in the city of Šadikanni, in the Ḫārbūr river valley region, commemorated his construction of a quay-wall for a canal during Aššur-rabi II’s reign, and the reconstruction of the temple during Aššūr-reš-iši’s, in his clay cylinder inscription recovered from Aššur.

== Inscriptions ==
Preceded by Aššur-rabi II	King of Assyria; 972–967 BC	Succeeded by Tukultī-apil-Ešarra II
