= Eulmash-shakin-shumi =

Eulmaš-šākin-šumi
- King of Babylon
- Reign: c. 1000–984 BC
- Predecessor: Kaššu-nādin-aḫi; 2nd Sealand Dynasty
- Successor: Ninurta-kudurrῑ-uṣur I
- House: Bῑt-Bazi Dynasty

Eulmaš-šākin-šumi, inscribed in cuneiform as É-ul-maš-GAR-MU, (Note: In contemporary arrowheads, such as IMJ 74.049.0124 in the Israel Museum, Jerusalem, at CDLI) or prefixed with the masculine determinative ^{m}, (Note: Babylonian King List A, BM 33332, iii '10.) “Eulmaš (Note: Eulmaš was the name of the Ištar temple in the city of Agade.) (is) the establisher of offspring”, c. 1000–984 BC, was the founder of the 6th Dynasty of Babylon, known as the Bῑt-Bazi Dynasty, after the Kassite tribal group from which its leaders were drawn. The Dynastic Chronicle (Note: Dynastic Chronicle v 9.) tells us that he ruled for fourteen years, the King List A, seventeen years.

== Biography ==
A small settlement near the Tigris in the 23rd century had been adopted by a minor Kassite clan by the 14th century, the name being co-opted as the ancestor figure for the tribe. In the midst of the turmoil inflicted by the Aramean migrations and the famines that drove them, Eulmaš-šākin-šumi seems to have seized the throne and possibly moved his capital to Kar-Marduk, a hitherto unknown location presumed to be less vulnerable to invasions of semi-nomads than Babylon.

An earlier character called Eulmaš-šākin-šumi, son of Bazi, appears as a witness on a kudurru (Note: BM 90840 i 29.) recording a land grant of twenty GUR arable land to Adad-zêr-ikîša, where he is called (amêlu)šaq-šup-par ša mâtâti, “officer of the lands” and also another (Note: Kudurru IM 90585, ii 10.) confirming ownership of seven GUR of arable land to a certain Iqīša-Ninurta, where he is described as a sak-ru-maš, “chariot officer.” He may also appear on another small broken kudurru, (Note: Kudurru from the Museum of Warwick, ii 12,) if his name has been deciphered correctly, but these three are dated to the tenth (first kudurru) and thirteenth (second and third kudurrus) years of the reign of Marduk-nādin-aḫḫē, too early to be this monarch if the chronology and sequence of kings currently favored is followed, but quite possibly an ancestor.

The Assyrian King List (Note: Assyrian King List A.117, Assur 14616c, iii 5 and also fragment (KAV 182) iii 2.) has him contemporary with Šulmanu-ašaredu II, an unlikely pairing. The Religious Chronicle (Note: Religious Chronicle ii 26-29 (restored).) mentions the “goddesses, the troops” in his fourteenth year but the context is lost. The Eclectic Chronicle (Note: Chronicle 24: BM 27859, 14–15.) records that “(Marduk stayed) on the dais (in) the fifth year of Eulmaš-šakin-šumi, the king. The fourteenth year …,” which seem to refer to interruptions in the Akitu festival. The Sun God Tablet (Note: The Sun God Tablet, BM 91000 i 24 – ii 17.) of Nabu-apla-iddina relates that Ekur-šum-ušabši, the priest and seer appointed during the time of Simbar-šipak, complained that due to the “stress and famine under Kaššu-nādin-aḫi,” an intermediate monarch, "the temple offerings of Šamaš (had) ceased," prompting Eulmaš-šākin-šumi to divert flour and sesame wine from that allocated to the god Bel and a garden in the new city district of Babylon for ongoing provisions.

There is an inscribed Lorestān bronze sword and fifteen inscribed arrowheads, somewhat inappropriately inscribed with the title šar kiššati, "king of the world," probably for use as votive offerings at temples rather than as offensive weapons. The Dynastic Chronicle reports that “he was buried in the palace of Kar-Marduk.” He was succeeded by Ninurta-kuddurī-uṣur and later Širikti-Šuqamuna, both “sons of Bazi.”
