= Gidara =

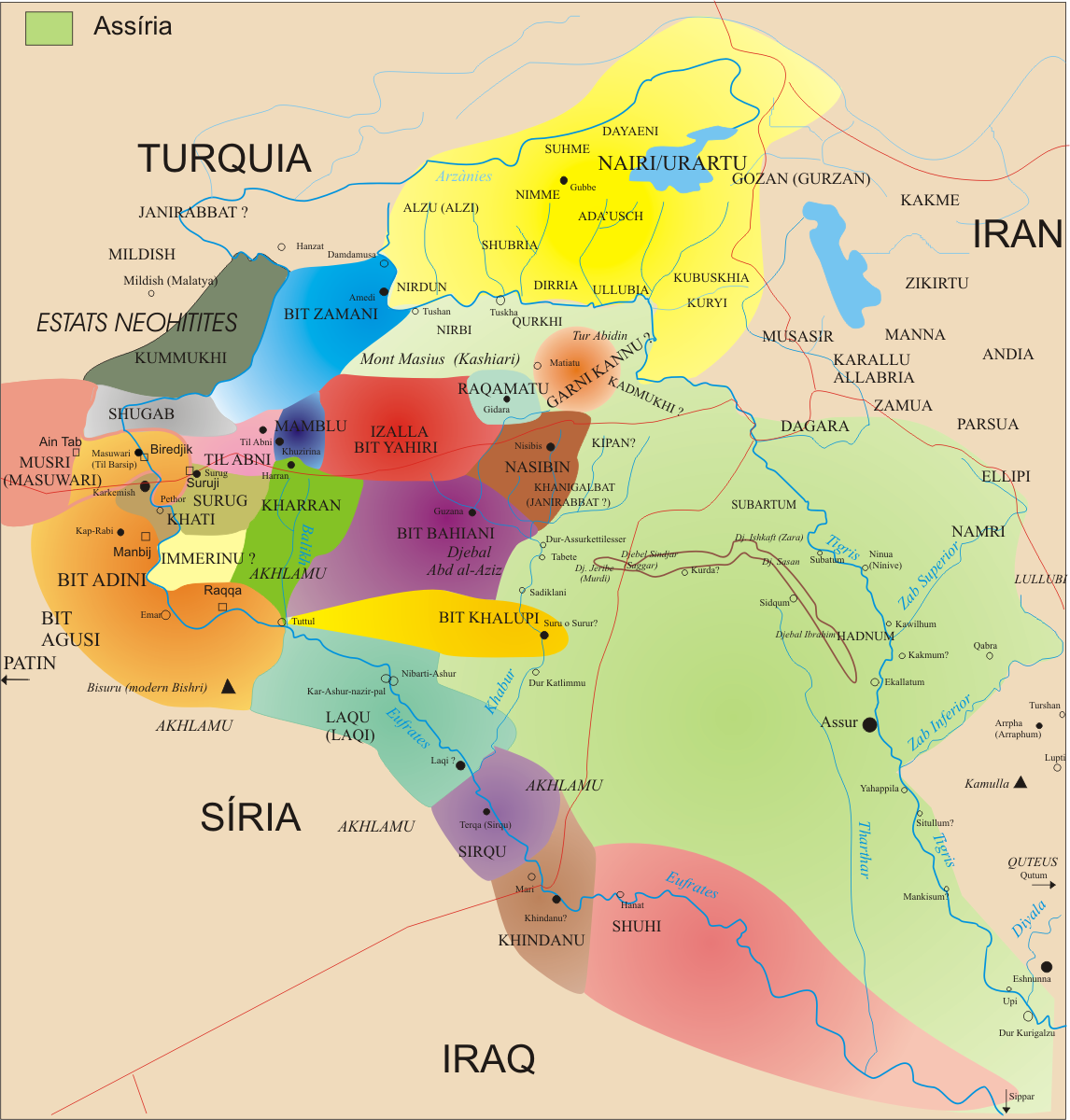
Gidara is labeled in the state of Raqamatu.

Gidara (West Semitic for wall) was an ancient city in northern Mesopotamia. It was located at the upper course of the Khabur river north of Guzana.

At the beginning of the 10th century BC the city was under Assyrian control. When Aramaic tribes moved into northern Mesopotamia, one of them, called Temanites by the Assyrians, managed to snatch the city from Assyrian control under the reign of Tiglath-Pileser II (966-935). The Aramaeans called their city Raqamatu. The Assyrian king Adad-nirari II (911-891) led campaign into the Khabur valley and captured the city after a siege in 898. The city was plundered and its Aramaic ruler Muquru and his family were deported to Assyria.
