= Ashur-nirari IV =

- King of Assyria

King of the Middle Assyrian Empire
- Reign: 1019–1013 BC
- Predecessor: Shalmaneser II
- Successor: Ashur-rabi II
- Father: Shalmaneser II

Aššur-nērārī IV, inscribed ^{m}aš-šur-ERIM.GABA, "(the god) Aššur is my help," was the king of Assyria, the 94th to appear on the Assyrian Kinglist, (Note: Khorsabad Kinglist, tablet IM 60017 (excavation nos.: DS 828, DS 32-54), iv 8.) (Note: Nassouhi Kinglist, Istanbul A. 116 (Assur 8836), iv 21.) ruling 1019/18–1013 BC. His short six-year reign was marked by confusion, famine, and a dearth of contemporary inscriptions.

== Biography ==
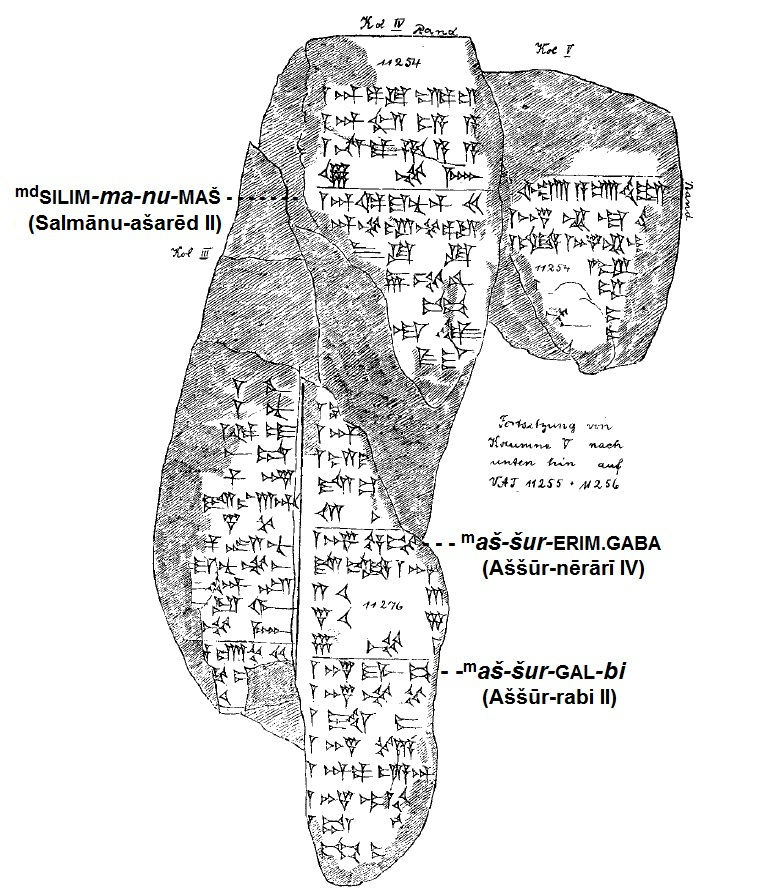
Schroeder's line art for the KAV 21 list of Eponyms showing the six years of Aššur-nērārī IV and both his predecessor and successor. (Note: Eponym List KAV 21, tablet VAT 11254, iv.)

He succeeded his father, Salmānu-ašarēd II, whose twelve-year reign seems to have ended in confusion, as the last limmu official on his eponym list is missing and recorded as ša ar[ki si...], the eponym ‘which is after’ (the previous name). Aššur-nērārī took the eponymy during his first year but the following year is marked ša EGIR ^{m}aš-šur-, “(year) after Aššur-…” and thereafter all the remaining years were recorded with a sequential number and a Winkelhaken to designate “ditto.” It is probable that events were so turbulent during this period that an eponym was not appointed.

The Babylonian king, Ninurta-kudurrῑ-uṣur I (987–985 BC) is given as his counterpart on the Synchronistic Kinglist (Note: Synchronistic Kinglist, Ass 14616c (KAV 216).) but the conventional chronology would suggest it was the earlier monarch, Simbar-Šipak (1025–1008 BC). The later king, Aššur-nāṣir-apli II mentions "Sibir, king of Karduniaš" in the context of the capture of the city of Atlila, in his annals, and historians have tentatively identified this individual with Simbar-Šipak, suggesting he engaged in warfare against Assyria around this time.

His successor was his uncle, Aššur-rabi II, a younger son of the earlier king Aššur-nāṣir-apli I. The circumstances of the succession are unknown and the Assyrian Kinglist gives no indication that he was overthrown, the usual cause of an uncle to succeed his nephew in the Assyrian monarchy.

== Inscriptions ==
Preceded by Salmānu-ašarēd II	King of Assyria; 1019–1013 BC	Succeeded by Aššur-rabi II
