= Mar-biti-apla-usur =

Mār-bīti-apla-uṣur
- King of Babylon
- Reign: c. 980–975 BC
- Predecessor: Širikti-šuqamuna; Bīt-Bazi Dynasty
- Successor: Nabû-mukin-apli; Dynasty of E
- House: Elamite Dynasty

Mār-bīti-apla-uṣur, inscribed DUMU-É-A-PAB on contemporary inscriptions on Lorestān bronze arrowheads or ^{d}A-É-AxA-ŠEŠ in the Dynastic Chronicle, means “O Marbīti, protect the heir.” Marbīti was a deity associated with Dēr with a sanctuary in Borsippa. Mārbītiaplauṣur reigned from c. 980 to 975 BC and was the sole king of Babylon’s short-lived seventh or Elamite Dynasty. (Note: Babylonian Kinglist A, BM 33332, iii 14.) He was a contemporary of Assyrian king Aššur-reš-iši II. (Note: Synchronistic King List, Ass 14616c (KAV 216), iii 8 and fragments VAT 11261 (KAV 10), ii 2 + Ass 13956dh (KAV 182), iii 5.)

== Biography ==
The circumstances surrounding the fall of the previous Bazi dynasty and his ascendancy are unknown. His name was wholly Akkadian and he was described as a remote descendant of Elam, šà.bal.bal ˹libir NIM.˺MA.KI (Akkadian: liplippi Elamti Labīru), in the Dynastic Chronicle. (Note: Dynastic Chronicle (ABC 18), column v lines 13 to 15.) There are no known rulers of Elam bearing Akkadian titles, but his reign coincides with a blank period in Elamite political history. His rule endured for six years and he was buried in the palace of Sargon or “a legitimate king,” depending on the interpretation of ina É-GAL LUGAL(-)GI.NA qé.bir, suggesting an interment suitable for a rightful king. The Eclectic Chronicle records the month of Nisānu in his fourth year but the event is not preserved. It may be concerning the suspension of the Akitu festival due to Aramean incursions, as this is the typical subject of the chronicle. (Note: Eclectic Chronicle (ABC 24) tablet BM 27859 line 16.)

Four bronze arrowheads from Lorestān have been recovered inscribed with his name and the royal title šar kiššati, “king of the world.” They were held as part of the Foroughi collection in Tehran.
