= Kashshu-nadin-ahi =

Kaššu-nādin-aḫi
- King of Babylon
- Reign: c. 1003–1001 BC
- Predecessor: Ea-mukin-zēri
- Successor: Eulmaš-šākin-šumi; Bῑt-Bazi Dynasty
- House: 2nd Sealand Dynasty

Kaššu-nādin-aḫi or -aḫḫē, ^{m}BI(=kaš)-šú-u-MU-ŠEŠ, (Note: Babylonian King List A, BM 33332, iii 8.) “(the) Kassite (god) gives (a) brother(s),” was the 3rd and final king of the 2nd Sealand Dynasty of Babylon, c. 1003–1001 BC. His brief three-year reign was marked by distressed times. There was a famine so severe that it caused the suspension of the regular food and drink offerings at the Ebabbar, or white house, temple of Šamaš in Sippar. (Note: The Sun God Tablet, BM 91000 i 24–28.)

== Biography ==
The Kassite derived theophoric element (^{d}Kaššû = “the Kassite (god)”) in his name is the only, rather tenuous, reference to the earlier dynasty, and may not be indicative of any actual affiliation so much as emulation of their longevity and presumed legitimacy. He was the son of a certain SAPpaia, who is otherwise unknown. (Note: Dynastic Chronicle (ABC 18), v 7.) The Synchronistic King List (Note: Synchronistic King List iii 4 and Synchronistic KL Fragment (KAV 182 iii 1 (restored)).) records his Assyrian contemporary as Aššur-nāsir-apli, c. 1050 to 1031 BC, but this is unlikely. The period of his reign falls midway through that of Aššur-rabi II, c. 1013 to 972 BC.

Although the Dynastic Chronicle records he was interred in a palace, its name is not preserved. There are currently no other inscriptions extant attesting to his rule, apart from the passing mention of his woes on the Sun God Tablet of Nabu-apla-iddina and a single inscription on a Lorestān bronze spear head.
