= Nabu-apla-iddina =

Nabû-apla-iddina
- King of Babylon
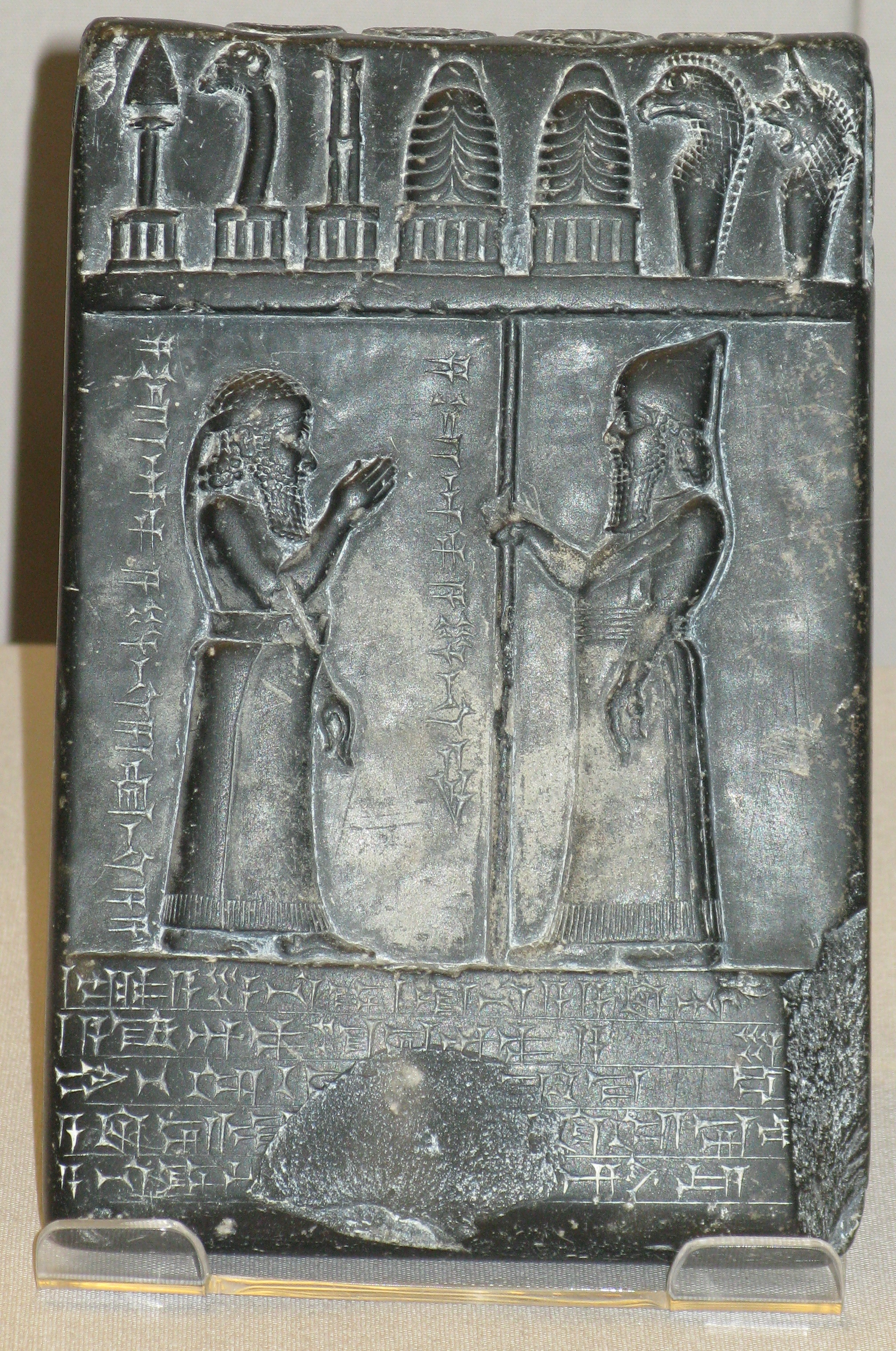
- A tablet now in the British Museum (Note: Stone tablet BM or ME 90922, published as BBSt XXVIII.) showing Nabu-apla-iddina (right) confirming a grant of land to a priest of the same name dated to his 20th year, found at Abu-Habbah (= Sippar) in 1881 by Hormuzd Rassam.
- Reign: c. 886–853 BC
- Predecessor: Nabû-šuma-ukin I
- Successor: Marduk-zakir-šumi I
- House: Dynasty of E
- Father: Nabû-šuma-ukin I
- Mother: Assyrian princess (?)

Nabû-apla-iddina (inscribed ^{md}Nábû-ápla-iddina^{na} (Note: Synchronistic History, tablet K4401a (ABC 21), iii 22–26.) or ^{md}Nábû-apla-íddina; (Note: Synchronistic Kinglist fragments VAT 11261 (KAV 10), ii 8, and Ass. 13956dh (KAV 182), iii 11.) reigned about 886–853 BC) was the sixth king of the dynasty of E of Babylon and he reigned for at least thirty-two years. (Note: Kudurru AO 21422 in the Louvre.) During much of Nabû-apla-iddina's reign Babylon faced a significant rival in Assyria under the rule of Ashurnasirpal II. Nabû-apla-iddina was able to avoid both outright war and significant loss of territory. There was some low level conflict, including a case where he sent a party of troops led by his brother to aid rebels in Suhu (Suhi, Sukhu, Suru). Later in his reign Nabu-apla-iddina agreed to a treaty with Ashurnasirpal II’s successor Shalmaneser III. Internally Nabu-apla-iddina worked on the reconstruction of temples and something of a literary revival took place during his reign with many older works being recopied.

== Biography ==
The 9th century BC was marked by a recovery of sorts after terrible instability of the preceding hundred and fifty years when Aramaean tribes had wantonly raided into Mesopotamia. He was the 2nd of four successive generations of a single family to rule. His father, Nabû-šuma-ukin I, had preceded him and he was to be succeeded by his son, Marduk-zakir-šumi I. The Synchronistic Kinglist (Note: Synchronistic Kinglist (KAV 216), Ass. 14616c, iii 18.) gives his Assyrian contemporary as Aššur-nāṣir-apli II although his reign extended on into that of Šulmānu-ašarēdu III.

He provided troops to the state of Suḫu (Suhi) in the middle Euphrates valley as part of its 878 BC revolt against Aššur-nāṣir-apli II. Kudurru, the governor of the fortress of Suru had defiantly refused to pay the Assyrians tribute, provoking their wrath. Nabû-apla-iddina's own brother Zabdanu and the diviner Bel-apli-iddina led the army of 3000 and following their defeat were taken prisoner. Although Aššur-nāṣir-apli claimed to have conquered the border fortresses Hirimmu and Harutu in his own inscriptions, this may be a restatement of his father, Tukulti-Ninurta II’s campaigns.

His reign marks the last time a governor of Isin was to appear as a prominent official in a legal document, and the roles of Kassites were to be central to the monarchy, occupying high positions at court. The province of Chaldea in southern Babylonia was first mentioned and the šakin temi begins to serve as regional governor. There was a shift in fashion, where, for example, the feathered crown is replaced by a peaked dome as a headdress of the king.

His inscriptions adorn perhaps five kudurrus, (Note: In addition to those cited add BM 90936, a corn-land deed from Abul-Ninurta to […]-uṣur, son of Arad-Nergal (BBSt. no. 29), and also VS 1, 57.) a possession inscription of his eldest son, and he is referenced in three Assyrian kinglists and two chronicles. (Note: The Eclectic Chronicle (ABC 24), tablet BM 27859, r 4–5.) Towards the end of his reign he concluded a treaty with Šulmānu-ašarēdu III which was to prove instrumental in stabilizing his successor Marduk-zakir-šumi I’s rule, following the revolt of his brother, Marduk-bēl-ušati. His reign is mentioned in a later copy of an offering list of aromatics (Note: Tablet BM 54060 neo-Babylonian list of aromatics.) used in the cult of Marduk in the Esagila at Babylon, and in a contemporary temple ordinance tablet (Note: Ash. 1922.256 (OECT 1, plates 20f) distributing meat in the Eanna.) distributing meats in the Eanna temple in Uruk.

=== The Sun God tablet ===
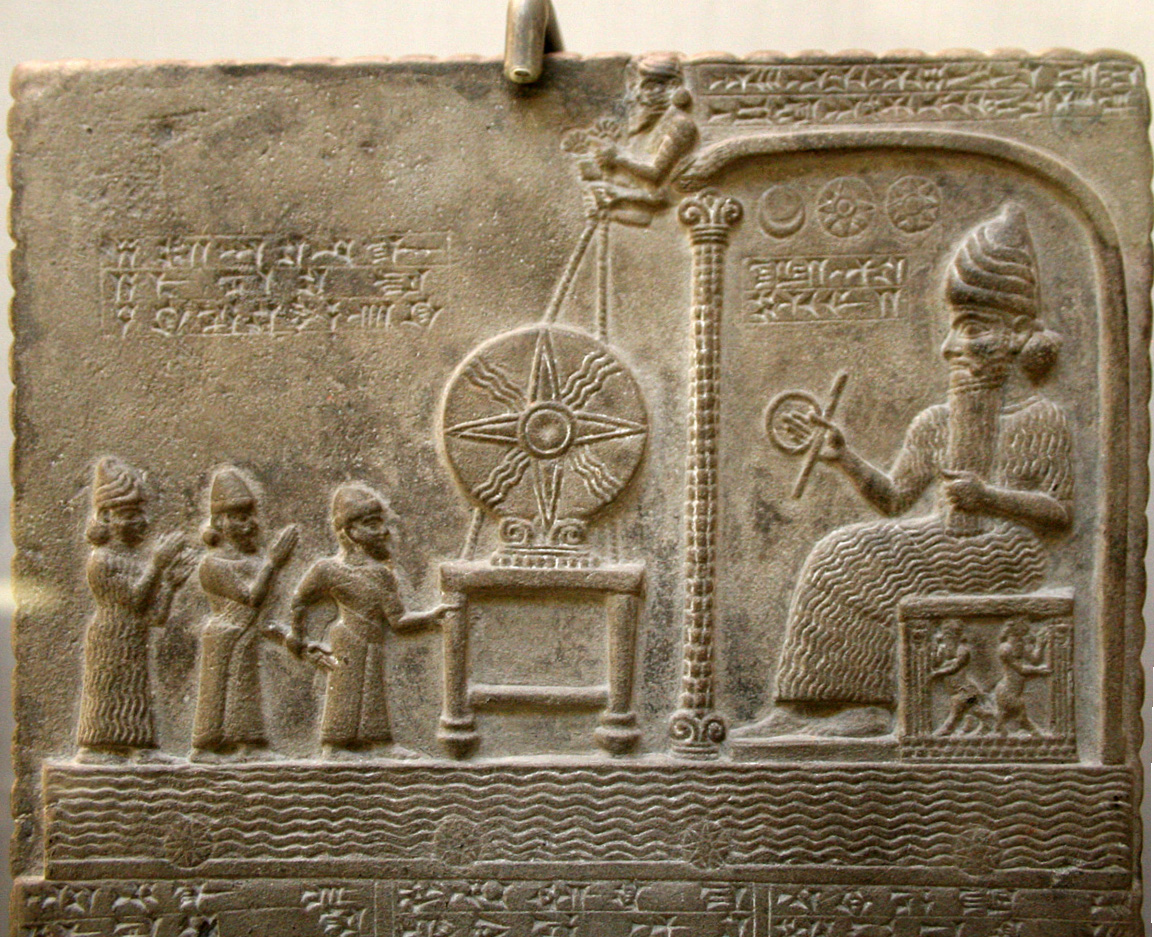
The Sun God Tablet. (Note: Tablet BM or ME 91000, published as BBSt XXXVI.)

The ravages of the Suteans during the 11th century reign of Adad-apla-iddina (c. 1064–1043 BC) had resulted in the cities of Uruk and Nippur being sacked and the temples of Sippar being so thoroughly destroyed that the cultic iconography of Šamaš was irretrievably lost. The intervening reign of Simbar-Šipak (c. 1025-1008 BC) had resulted in a votive disc being suspended as a substitute and a priest, Ekur-šum-ušabši, being appointed. Under the reign of Kaššu-nādin-aḫi (c. 1006-1004 BC)) a prebend had been provided to the priest. Not until Nabû-apla-iddina’s reign, however, was a replacement icon crafted for installation in the Ebabbar temple in Sippar, celebrated in the Sun God Tablet (pictured), also known as the tablet of Shamash. He is portrayed being led by Nabû-nadin-shum, the priest and descendant of Ekur-šum-ušabši, and the goddess Aa, facing the seated figure of Šamaš. The inscription celebrates Nabû-apla-iddina’s victory over the Sutû, the “evil foe,” being the first Babylonian king in over two centuries (since Nabû-kudurrī-uṣur I, c. 1121–1100 BC) to claim a military title, “heroic warrior ... who bears an awe-inspiring bow …,” for their overthrow.

The tablet was rediscovered some 250 years later by Nabû-apal-usur (626–605 BC), when it was already broken, and he had it placed in a clay box with his own inscription for safe keeping where it was discovered in the 19th century.

=== Literary revival ===
There is some evidence for a literary revival, with fresh editions of the Utukkū Lemnūtu series and the Sakikkū (SA.GIG) texts prepared, and for the sharing of a scribe between the Babylonian and Assyrian courts. Kabti-ilani-Marduk’s work, the Epic of the plague god Erra, is sometimes dated to his reign and is certainly of this period.
