= Marduk-zakir-šumi I kudurru =

The Marduk-zakir-shumi I kudurru is a boundary stone (kudurru) of Marduk-zakir-šumi I, a king in the 9th dynasty of Babylon from 855 - 819 BC.

The kudurru of Marduk-zakir-shumi is a stele-like kudurru, with a front face of cuneiform, and a semi-circular top, (a register area), with the king, people, and iconographic representations of gods.

== See also ==
- Marduk-zakir-šumi I
- Kudurru
