= Marduk-zakir-shumi I =

Marduk-zâkir-šumi I
- King of Babylon
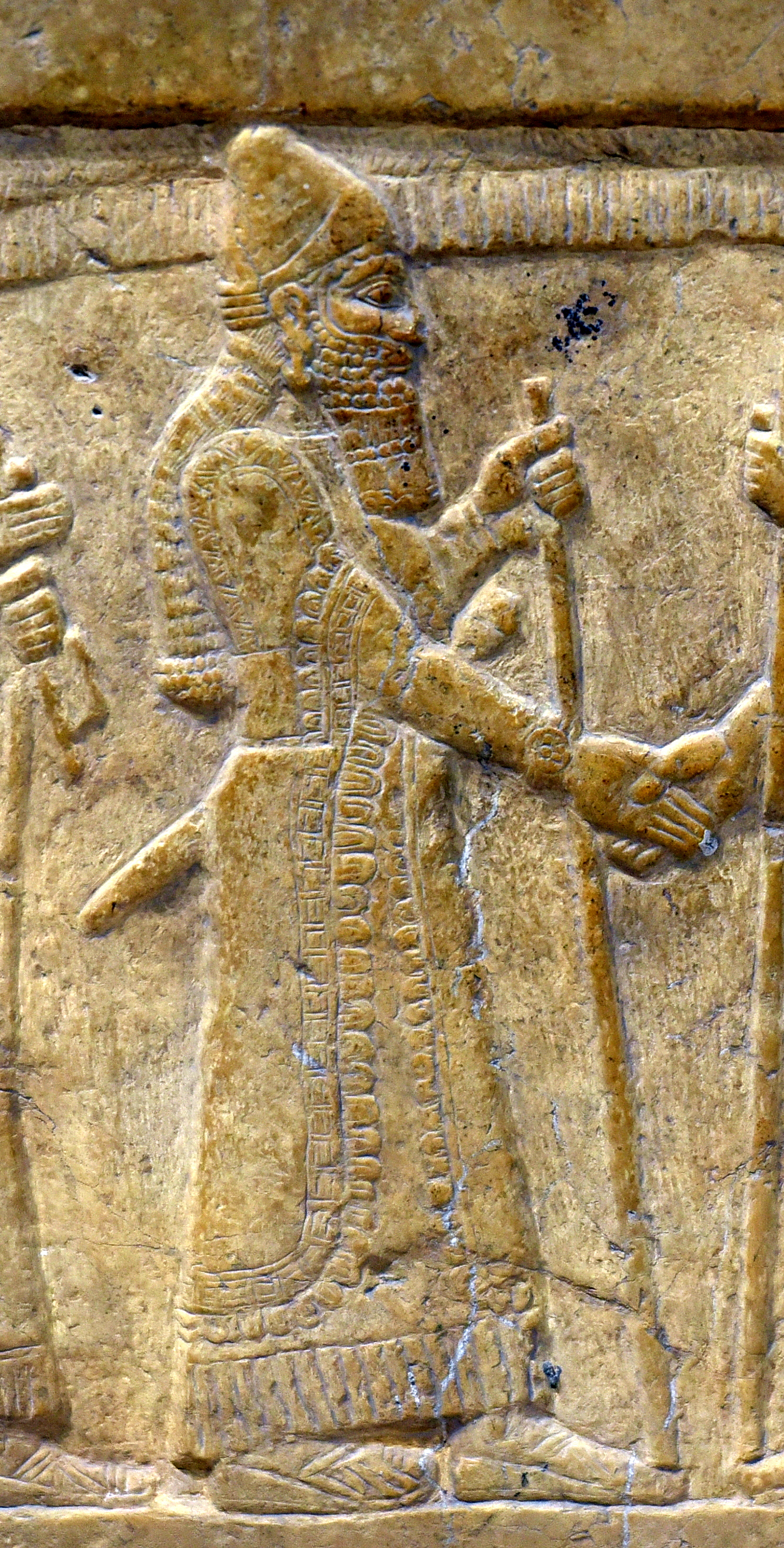
- Marduk-zakir-shumi I, on the Throne Dais of Shalmaneser III at the Iraq Museum
- Reign: c. 855 – 819 BC
- Predecessor: Nabû-apla-iddina
- Successor: Marduk-balāssu-iqbi
- House: Dynasty of E

Marduk-zâkir-šumi (inscribed ^{md}AMAR.UTU-za-kir-MU in a reconstruction of two kinglists, (Note: Synchronistic Kinglist KAV 10 (VAT 11261) ii 9.) (Note: Synchronistic Kinglist KAV 182 (Ass. 13956dh) iii 12.) 'Marduk pronounced the name',) was a king of Babylon from 855 to 819 BC during the mixed dynastic period referred to in antiquity as the dynasty of E. He was a contemporary of the Assyrian kings, Salmānu-ašarēdu III (commonly known as Shalmaneser III) (Note: Synchronistic Kinglist, KAV 216 (Ass. 14616c), iii 20.) (859–824 BC) and Šamši-Adad V (824–811 BC) with whom he was allied. (Note: Eclectic Chronicle (ABC 24) BM 27859 reverse (r 5-7).)

== Biography ==
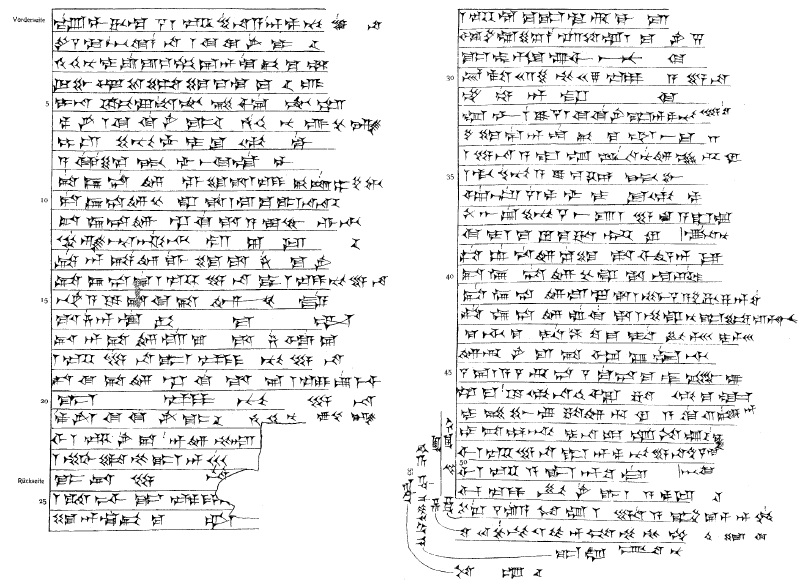
Kudurru of land sale near Dilbat dated to Marduk-zâkir-šumi’s 11th year. (Note: Kudurru VA 208, published as VS I 35.)

There are few contemporary inscriptions bearing witness to his reign. A kudurru (Note: Kudurru AO 6684, published as RA 16 (1919) 125–126.) granting Ibni-Ištar, a kalû-priest of the temple of Eanna in Uruk, land by Marduk-zâkir-šumi, is dated to his second year. Nazi-Enlil was governor or šandabakku (inscribed ^{LÚ}GÚ.EN.NA) of Nippur, the first appearance of this office since Kassite times, as he appears as a witness along with the crown prince, Marduk-balāssu-iqbi. A second kudurru records a private land sale near Dilbat. His son, Enlil-apla-uṣur, was to succeed him in Marduk-balāssu-iqbi’s reign. A lapis lazuli seal of this king depicting Marduk's statue resting on his pet dragon, Mušḫuššu, was an offering intended to be hung around an idol's neck.

=== Marduk-bēl-ušati’s revolt ===
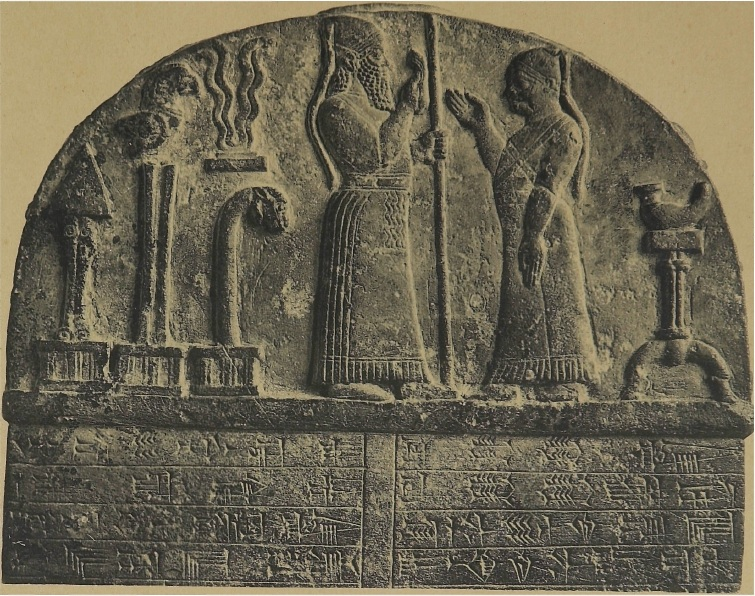
Kudurru recording the bequest of land by Marduk-zâkir-šumi to Ibni-Ištar on behalf of the Eanna temple in Uruk

His younger brother, Marduk-bēl-ušati (inscribed ^{md}AMAR.UTU-EN-ú-sat), rebelled and established a brief regime in the Diyāla region, seizing Daban. (Note: Synchronistic Chronicle (ABC 21), K4401a + Rm 854, iii 27-35.) Assyrian sources describe him as šar ḫammā’i, "usurper." During years 851 and 850 BC, the Assyrian king Salmānu-ašarēdu III came to Marduk-zâkir-šumi‘s aid (ana nīrārūtišu) and campaigned in concert (Note: The Assyrian account recalls: issu Marduk-zâkir-šumi ikšuda gārêšu, ”after Marduk-zâkir-šumi had conquered his enemies.”) to force him to flee to the Jasubu mountainous region northeast, area of lower Diyāla. During the first of the campaigns, Marduk-bēl-ušati made a stand at Ganannate but was defeated outside the city walls. He was able to take refuge within the city which remained unconquered. The second campaign resulted in the city’s fall and he beat a hasty retreat with some of his officers, escaping "like a fox through a hole" to the city of Arman (Ḫalman) which itself was taken after a siege. Salmānu-ašarēdu left an account of these events on his Black Obelisk:

In the eighth year of my reign, Marduk-bêl-usâte, the younger brother, revolted against Marduk-zâkir-šumi, king of Karduniaš, and they divided the land in its entirety. In order to avenge Marduk-zâkir-šumi, I marched out and captured Mê-Turnat. In the ninth year of my reign, I marched against Akkad a second time. I besieged Ganannate. As for Marduk-bêl-usâte, the terrifying splendor of Assur and Marduk overcame him and he went up into the mountains to save his life. I pursued him. I cut down with the sword Marduk-bêl-usâte and the rebel army officers who were with him.

— Salmānu-ašarēdu, Black Obelisk (Note: Black Obelisk, BM WAA 118885, crafted c. 827 BC, lines 73–84)

During his campaign, Salmānu-ašarēdu captured the city of Baqani, extracting tribute from Adini of Bit-Dakkuri, (Note: Door fitting from the Balawat Gates, BM 124660.) also from Mušallim-Marduk of the Amukani and the leader of the Yakin tribes, the earliest attestation of these Chaldean groups and made a pilgrimage to Babylon where he recounted "I ascended to Esagila, the palace of the gods, the abode of the king of all …" (Note: e-li-ma ana é-sag-ila É.GAL DINGIR.MEŠ šu-bat MAN gim-ri …) He practiced his religious devotions at other cultic shrines as his Black Obelisk recalls “I went to the great urban centers. I made sacrifices in Babylon, Borsippa and Kutha.” (Note: a-na ma-ḫa-zi rabûti^{meš} a-lik niqê(udu.siskur)^{meš} ina Bābili^{ki} Barsip^{ki} Ku-te-e^{ki} ēpuš.) A relief from the front of his throne base (Note: ND 1 1000 = IM 65574, throne base from Fort Shalmaneser (Nimrud).) depicts him gripping Marduk-zâkir-šumi’s hand in a public display of Assyro-Babylonian friendship. The kings are flanked by beardless youths identified as the crown princes and presumed to be Šamši-Adad V and Marduk-balāssu-iqbi, who would eventually come to conflict.

=== Babylonian intervention in the Assyrian succession ===
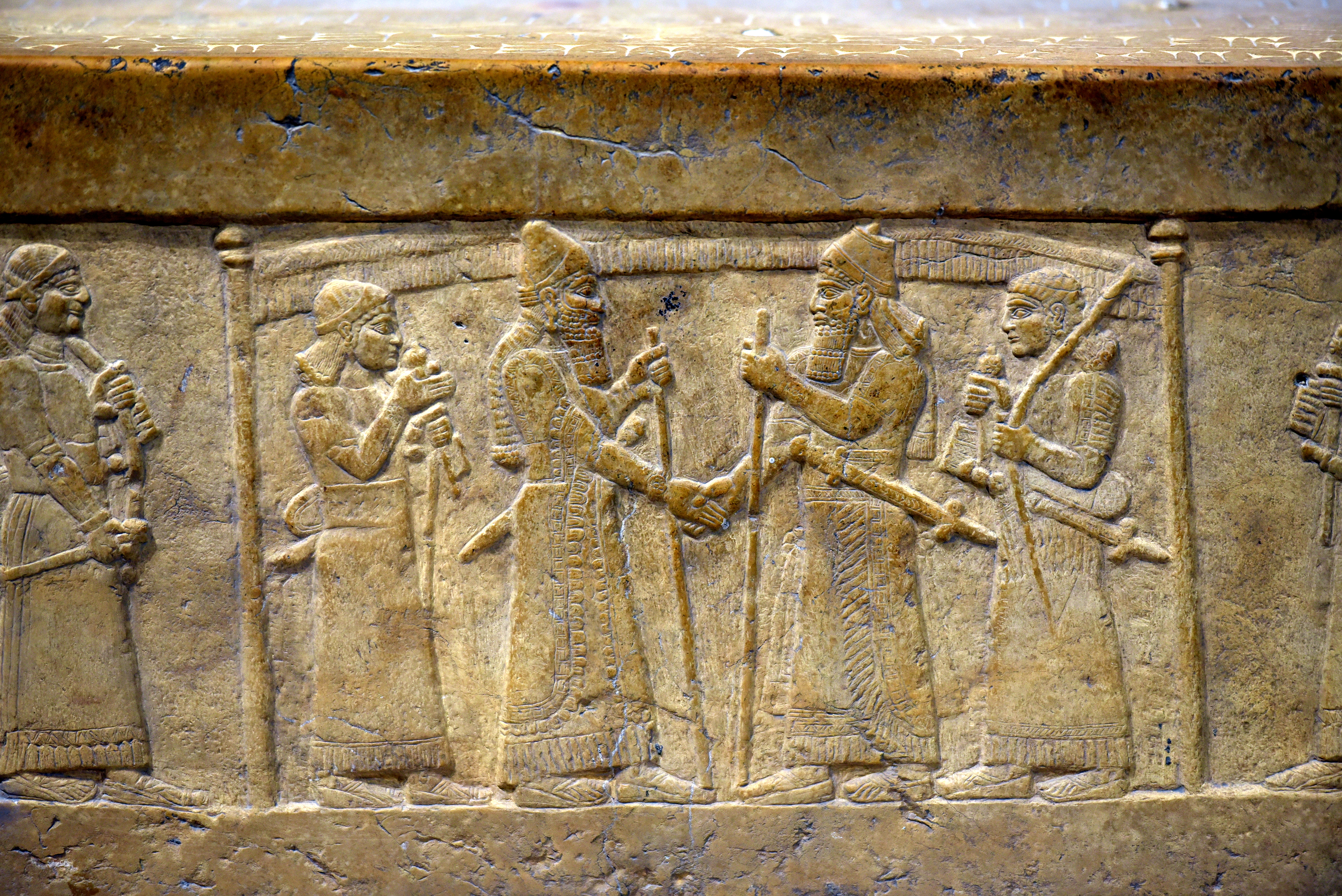
Marduk-zakir-shumi (left) greeted by Shalmaneser III (right). Detail, front panel, Throne Dais of Shalmaneser III, Iraq Museum.

The opportunity came for Marduk-zâkir-šumi to return the favor when, in his 32nd year of rule, c. 826 BC, Salmānu-ašarēdu's own son, Aššur-danin-apli ("Aššur has strengthened the son") rebelled against his father. Šamši-Adad V recalled:

Where [my brother] Aššur-danin-apli, in the time of Salmānu-ašarēdu, his father, acted wickedly, bringing about sedition, rebellion, and wicked plotting, caused the land to rise in revolt, prepared for war, brought the people of Assyria, north and south, to his side, and made bold speeches, brought the cities into the rebellion and set his face to begin strife and battle… 27 cities, along with their fortifications… revolted against Salmānu-ašarēdu, king of the four regions of the world, my father, and… had gone to the side of Aššur-danin-apli.

— Šamši-Adad V, Annals

The Synchronistic History remains silent on these events, but a treaty (Note: Stone tablet of treaty, Rm.II 427 (Weidner, AfO 8 (1932–33) 27-29; SAA II 001).) between Šamši-Adad and Marduk-zâkir-šumi seems to place the Assyrian in an inferior position, indicative of his reliance on and debt to the Babylonian king. It concludes with a series of curses apparently copied from the Code of Hammurabi and notably omitting the god Aššur:

(May Marduk) destroy his country, smite his people [through hunge]r and famine. May Anu, fath]er of the gods, break his scepter. (May Illil) determine as his [fate] a reign of exhaustion, scarce days, years of fa[mine]. [Ma]y Ea ... dam [his] rivers [at the source]. (May Šamaš) overturn his kingship. "(May Šamaš) not j[udge] his lawsuit ([May Sîn]) [bring to an end (days, months and) years of] his [rei]gn in sighing and [moaning]. [May Adad deprive him of rai]n from heaven and of seasonal flooding from the underground water. (May Adad) [turn] his [country] into [ruin mounds left by a flood].

— Šamši-Adad/Marduk-zâkir-šumi treaty, lines 18–35 edited

It may well have been concluded while Salmānu-ašarēdu was still alive and been accompanied by the diplomatic marriage of Marduk-zâkir-šumi's daughter, Shammuramat, the inspiration for the legend of Semiramis, to Šamši-Adad. The consequences were, however, that Šamši-Adad resented his subordinate position and came to wreak a terrible revenge during the reign of Marduk-zâkir-šumi's son and heir, Marduk-balāssu-iqbi.

== See also ==
- Marduk-zakir-šumi I kudurru

== Inscriptions ==
ABC Assyrian and Babylonian Chronicles (Grayson, 1975); AfO Archiv für Orientforschungen; AO siglum of objects in the collection of the Musée du Louvre; BM Department of Western Asiatic Antiquities, British Museum; IM National Museum of Iraq (Baghdad); K. Kouyunjik collection, British Museum; Rm Rassam collection, British Museum; KAV Keilschrifttexte aus Assur verschiedenen (Schroeder, 1920); ND prefix of field numbers, excavations at Nimrud 1949–63; RA Revue d'Assyriologie; SAA State Archives of Assyria; VA Vorderasiatische Abetilung, Vorderasiatisches Museum Berlin; VAT Vorderasiatische Abetilung, Tontafel, siglum of tablets in Vorderasiatisches wing of the Pergamon Museum, Berlin; VS Vorderasiatische Schriftdenkmäler (Ungnad, 1907).
