= Shamash-mudammiq =

Šamaš-mudammiq
- King of Babylon
- Reign: c. ?–901 BC (Note: Shamash-mudammiq is described as having been defeated by the Assyrian king Adad-nirari II c. 901 BC.)
- Predecessor: Mār-bῑti-áḫḫē-idinna
- Successor: Nabû-šuma-ukin I
- House: Dynasty of E (mixed dynasties)

Šamaš-mudammiq, inscribed ^{md}Šamaš-^{mu}mudammiq (^{md}UTU-mu-SIG_{5}), (Note: Synchronistic King List fragment, KAV 182, Ass 13956dh, iii 9.) meaning “Šamaš shows favor,” was the 4th king of Babylon in a sequence designated as the Dynasty of E and ruled during the latter part of the 10th century BC. He was contemporary with the Assyrian king Adad-Nārāri II (Note: Chronicle 24, BM 27859, the Eclectic Chronicle, r 2.) with whom he sparred. (Note: Synchronistic History (ABC 21), tablet K 4401a + Rm 854, iii 1–8.)

== Biography ==
Of unknown ancestry, the duration of his reign is equally uncertain. That he followed Mār-bῑti-áḫḫē-idinna is indicated by the sequence on the Assyrian Synchronistic King List, (Note: Synchronistic King List, KAV 216, Ass 14616c, iii 13.) but Assyrian contact was scanty and this may merely record those rulers who had interacted, omitting those who did not. His rule marks the resumption of contacts characterized as “battles, alliances, shifting of borders, and (later) diplomatic marriages that seem to have bound the two countries together.”

The Annals of Adad-Nārāri II record that the Assyrian king conducted a campaign against Babylonia during the last decade of the 10th century although the precise chronology is vague, perhaps between 908 and 902 BC. He claims to have defeated Šamaš-muddamiq who “set up a line of battle at the foot of Mount Yalman,” possibly southeastern Jebel Hamrin, when he attempted to make a stand in the pass and “his chariots, and teams of horses, (Adad-Nārāri) took away from him.”

…he who brought about the defeat of Šamaš-mudammiq, king of Karduniaš, from Yalman to the river Turan (DUR.AN.MEŠ). From Lahiru to Ugar-sallu, to the border of Assyria…All the land of (the cultic city of) Dēr I conquered, Arrapḫa and Lubdu, the fortresses of Karduniaš, I added to Assyria.

— Adad-Nārāri II, Annals, dated to the eponym year of Ili-napishti-uṣur, eunuch of the king

The fortresses were on the middle Euphrates, less than 100 miles from Babylon.
