= Shirikti-shuqamuna =

Širikti-šuqamuna
- King of Babylon
- Reign: c. 981 BC
- Predecessor: Ninurta-kudurrῑ-uṣur I
- Successor: Mar-biti-apla-usur; Dynasty of Elam
- House: Bῑt-Bazi Dynasty

Širikti-šuqamuna, inscribed phonetically in cuneiform ^{m}ši-rik-ti-^{d}šu-qa-mu-nu and meaning “gift of (the god) Šuqamuna”, c. 981 BC, succeeded his fellow “son of Bazi,” Ninurta-kudurrῑ-uṣur I, as 3rd king of the Bῑt-Bazi or 6th Dynasty of Babylon and exercised the kingship for just 3 months, an insufficient time to merit an official regnal year.

== Biography ==
He was the last monarch of the Bīt-Bazi dynasty, which had reigned for 20 years 3 months according to the King List A, (Note: King List A, BM 33332, iii.) and a contemporary of the Assyrian king Aššur-rabi II, (Note: Synchronistic King List A.117, Assur 14646c.) c. 1012–971 BC. He was named for the Kassite god of war and of the chase, Šuqamuna, one of the two (with Šumalia) associated with the investiture of kings. The Chronicle Concerning the Reign of Šamaš-šuma-ukin, (Note: Šamaš-šuma-ukin Chronicle (ABC 15), BM 96273, lines 20 to 21.) a text containing disconnected passages from writing boards, names him as a brother of Nabû-kudurrī-uṣur, which is probably an error for the Ninurta-kudurrī-uṣur whom he succeeded. A person with this name (which appears nowhere else) appears as the šakin bāb ekalli, palace gate officer, and beneficiary of a land grant on a kudurru (Note: Land granto to Širikti-Šuqamuna kudurru IM 74651, in the National Museum of Iraq.) but this was during the reign of Marduk-šāpik-zēri, some eighty years and ten reigns previously.

The Dynastic Chronicle (Note: The Dynastic Chronicle (ABC 18) v 11.) records that he was interred in a palace.
