= Mār-bīti =

Mesopotamian god

- Warrior god
- Major cult center: Malgium, Der, Borsippa

Mār-bīti was a Mesopotamian god. While his character is overall poorly known, it is agreed that he was regarded as warlike. He could be associated with deities such as Nanaya, Nabu or various members of the local pantheons of Der and Borsippa. While he is already attested in an inscription from the Kassite period, most attestations of him come from the first millennium BCE. He was originally worshiped in Malgium and Der in eastern Mesopotamia, but he is also attested in Borsippa, Babylon and Kalhu. A number of temples dedicated to him are mentioned in known texts, but their ceremonial names in most cases remain unknown. Two kings of Babylonia bore theophoric names invoking him, Mār-bīti-apla-uṣur and Mār-bῑti-aḫḫē-idinna.

== Name and character ==
The theonym Mār-bīti (^{d}DUMU-É, ^{d}A-É) can be literally translated as "son of the house", though the last sign in this context refers to a temple instead. Due to the fact that in known sources the name appears in association with a similar circle of deities regardless of the city, it is presumed that there was only one god named Mār-bīti.

Mār-bīti's character is poorly known, though it is agreed he was regarded as a warlike deity. He could be described as a "terrifying hero". Nebuchadnezzar II in an inscription highlighting this function refers to him as the "lord who breaks the weapon of my enemy". Ritual texts indicate he was armed with a bow, arrows and a quiver. An astronomical commentary states that a star known as Harrow was "the weapon of Mār-bīti, within which one sees the subterranean water" (^{mul.giš}GÁN.ÙR ^{giš}TUKUL šá ^{d}A-É šá ina lìb-bi-šú ABZU IGI.KÁR). It is possible that this astral body can be found in eastern part of the constellation Vela.

A possible depiction of Mār-bīti has been identified on a stele from Borsippa (VaS 1 36) dated to the reign of Nabu-shuma-ishkun. Two goddesses depicted on it alongside the male figure who is presumed to represent him might be Nanaya and Sutītu.

== Associations with other deities ==
Both in Borsippa and in Der Mār-bīti was associated with Nanaya, Bēlet-balāṭi and Kurunītu. In texts pertaining to the former of these cities he also appears alongside members of Nanaya's court such as Lisin and Uṣur-amāssu. A single text pairs him with Sutītu, one of the goddesses first attested in the first millennium BCE who represented specific ethnic or linguistic groups (in this case Suteans). According to Joan Goodnick Westenholz, a group consisting of these two deities and Nanaya is attested as a "special sub-unit in the local pantheon of Borsippa".

In Babylon and Borsippa, Mār-bīti was regarded as a member of the circle of Nabu. The same connection is also attested in Assyrian sources pertaining to the veneration of the latter god in Kalhu. A single text from this city might refer to him as the "great vizier" of Nabu (^{lú}SUKKAL GAL-u ša ^{d}MUATI). According to Francesco Pomponio, this connection developed when Nabu grew in prominence in the Mesopotamian pantheon.

Raphael Kuthscher speculated that two hypostases of Mār-bīti mentioned in a text from the reign of Shamshi-Adad V, Mār-bīti-ša-pān-bīti ("in the front of the house" ) and Mār-bīti-ša-birīt-nāri ("in the middle of the river"), might correspond to earlier Dan-bītum and Rašub-bītum, two lions whose statues were placed at the entrance of the temple of Ulmašītum in Malgium during the reign of the local king Takil-iliššu. However, this proposal is regarded as implausible by Manfred Krebernik.

== Worship ==
While a single votive inscription mentioning Mār-bīti (of unknown provenance) has been dated to the Kassite period, most of the known attestations of this god come from the first millennium BCE. A single Old Babylonian reference mentioned in a number of old Assyriological publications is now considered to be an erroneous reading, and the deity meant was most likely Ilaba instead.

Mār-bīti's main cult centers were Malgium and Der, located in the proximity of each other in the eastern part of Mesopotamia. In the former city, he was seemingly the main local god in the Neo-Assyrian period, though an Old Babylonian inscription indicates that its tutelary deities were Ea and Damkina. Manfred Krebernik tentatively speculates that Mār-bīti might have originated in Malgium but his cult was at some point transferred to Der. During the reign of Shamshi-Adad V, Assyrian troops attacked said city and carried away the statue of Mār-bīti alongside those of other locally worshiped deities, such as Ištaran, Urkittu and Saĝkud of Bubê. It was returned by Ashurbanipal, and in one of the inscription of this king Mār-bīti is mentioned among the deities brought to the freshly rebuilt Edimgalkalamma, "house, great bond of the land", the temple of Ištaran. An administrative text from the reign of Sargon II mentions that a sangû priest of Mār-bīti was present in Der.

A further eastern city where Mār-bīti might have been venerated was Eshnunna. A commentary on Enūma Eliš, known from copies from seventh century BCE Assur and from the library of Ashurbanipal (located in Nineveh), makes an allusion to "Mār-bīti of Eshnunna" and mentions a cultic race (lismu) dedicated to him, but there is no other evidence that he was a member of the local pantheon.

At least since the reign of Nabu-shuma-ishkun, Mār-bīti was also worshiped in Borsippa, where he is first mentioned in a kudurru (boundary stone) inscription from this period. In the Neo-Babylonian period, a night vigil took place in his temple located there thrice a year. The rebuilding of this house of worship is mentioned in inscriptions of Nebuchadnezzar II, but its ceremonial name is unknown. Colophons of texts from the Parthian period, as well as an unpublished hymn to the city of Borsippa, mention a temple named Emaḫgirlzal, "exalted house of joy", which was located in the proximity of either this city or Babylon. It is treated as separate from the nameless temple in Borsippa by Rocío Da Riva and Gianluca Galetti. In Babylon Mār-bīti was worshiped in the Esagil temple complex. Furthermore, according to the tablet BM 41239, a religious calendar, the sanctuary of Mandanu in Babylon was a stop in a procession of Mār-bīti and Ninurta from Borsippa to Kish which took place in the month of Šabāṭu. A temple dedicated to him also existed in Ilip. It is mentioned in the text BM 77433, a Neo-Babylonian or later list of temples located in Babylon and nearby smaller settlements. Its ceremonial name is not listed in this source.

An oath formula from Kalhu from the reign of Sinsharishkun mentions Mār-bīti in a context indicating he was also worshiped in Assyria in association with Nabu, similarly as in Borsippa.

Examples of theophoric names invoking Mār-bīti are known from Babylonia, including those of kings Mār-bīti-apla-uṣur (who likely originated in eastern Mesopotamia) and Mār-bῑti-aḫḫē-idinna.
