= Nabu-shuma-ukin I =

Nabû-šuma-ukin I
- King of Babylon
- Reign: c. 900–887 BC
- Predecessor: Šamaš-muddamiq
- Successor: Nabû-apla-iddina
- Spouse: Assyrian princess
- Issue: Nabû-apla-iddina
- House: Dynasty of E / Mixed Dynasties

Nabû-šuma-ukin I, inscribed ^{md}Nābû-šuma-ú-kin, (Note: Synchronistic King List iii 16 and variant fragments KAV 10 ii 7, KAV 182 iii 10.) meaning “Nabû has established legitimate progeny,” was the 5th king listed in the sequence of the so-called dynasty of E, possibly a mixed series of dynasties, that ruled over Babylon during the early Iron Age. The exact duration of his reign is unknown but it was probably at the beginning of the 9th century BC. His rule marks a temporary resurgence in the fortunes of Babylonia, which was to last on through his son and successor, Nabû-apla-iddina’s reign and the two kings who followed in this four-generation dynasty.

== Biography ==
The circumstances of his ascendancy and his relationship with his predecessor are not known. The beginning of his reign was marked by war with Assyria when Adad-Nārāri II swept down on his second campaign and supposedly defeated him according to the Assyrian version, apparently sacking several cities and hauling their "vast booty" back home. (Note: Synchronistic History iii 9-21 which confuses him with Nabû-šuma-iškun.) The outcome may not have been quite so one-sided as described as the Assyro-Babylonian border was pushed back north to the basin of the Lesser Zab.

His relations for the remainder of Adad-Nārāri’s time and with the next Assyrian monarch, Tukulti-Ninurta II, (Note: Chronicle 24, the Eclectic Chronicle, r 3, 4 identifies him as his contemporary.) in contrast were good, and he made an entente cordiale and exchanged daughters in marriage with one of them, the Synchronistic Chronicle being too fragmentary here to be sure which one, auguring in an extended period of peaceful relations.
