= Religious Chronicle =

Ancient Mesopotamian register of portents

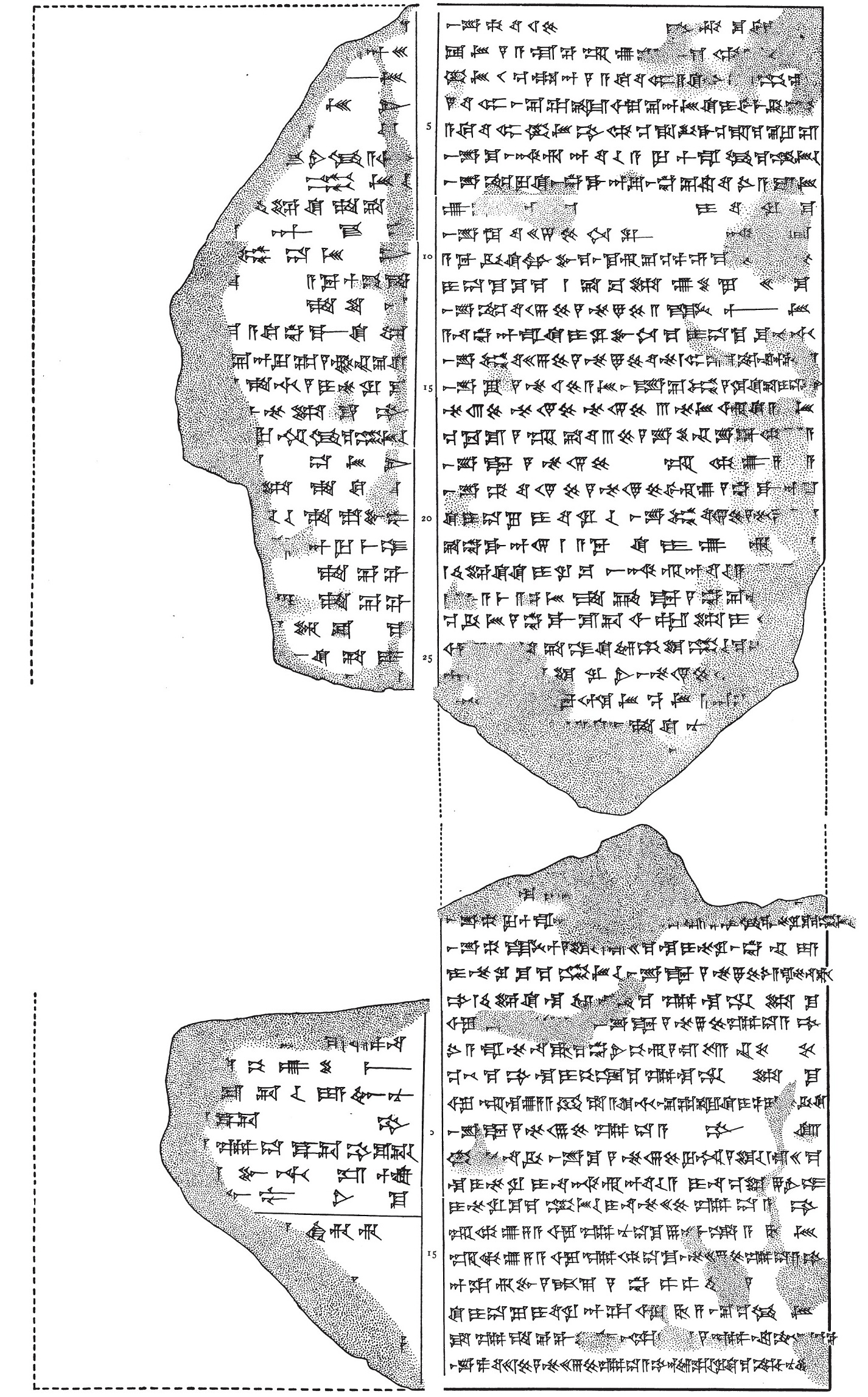
- L. W. King's line art for the Religious Chronicle
- Created: c. 200 BC
- Discovered: before 1881
- Present location: British Museum, London, England

The Religious Chronicle is an ancient Mesopotamian register of portents such as the straying of wild animals into urban areas and extraordinary natural phenomena which presaged the disruptions which interfered with the Akītu or new year festival and the performance of its regular cultic activities which included the transport of the idols of the gods to the city of Babylon during the tumultuous years of chaos caused by the incursions of Aramean nomads.

== The text ==
The Religious Chronicle seems to have drawn its sources from the protases of omen literature in contrast to the Chronicle of Early Kings which drew them from their apodoses. The tablet has two columns per side and is in poor condition, with the surface severely abraded and most of the left-hand side (columns I and IV) gone. It may have been part of a series as there is part of a catch-line evident on line 8 of column IV. It is designated BM 35968 (Sp III, 504) and is held in the British Museum. Written during the Seleucid era, it was acquired by the Museum from Spartali & Co, sponsors of much of the unofficial tablet gathering in Iraq under Ottoman jurisdiction in 1880, and consequently its find spot is uncertain.

The earliest king to appear in the text is Nabû-šumu-libūr (c. 1033 – 1026 BC) on line 16 of the first column and the work also name-drops Nabû-mukin-apli (c. 978 – 943 BC). The intervening text describes a reign or reigns of up to seventeen years. Only Simbar-Šipak (c. 1025 - 1008 BC) and Eulmaš-šākin-šumi (c. 1004 – 987 BC) reigned so long during this period. The historical era covered was a period of great turmoil.

Column II, in a passage ascribed to Simbar-Šipak's reign, includes a possible reference to a solar eclipse: “On the twenty-sixth day of the month Sivan, in the seventh year, day turned to night and there was a fire in the sky.” Rowton identified this with May 9, 1012 BC although the current chronology places this in his thirteenth year and the absence of an appropriate technical term for the eclipse, such as AN-KU_{10}, casts doubt on this astronomical identification.

== Primary publications ==
- L. W. King (1907). Chronicles Concerning Early Babylonian Kings: Vol. 2 Texts and Translations. Luzac & Co. pp. 70–86, 157–179.
- E. Unger (1931). Babylon: die heilige Stadt der Babylonier. Walter de Gruyter. pp. 274–276.
- A. K. Grayson (1975). Assyrian and Babylonian chronicles. J. J. Augustin. pp. 133–138.
- Jean-Jacques Glassner (2004). Mesopotamian Chronicles. Society of Biblical Literature. pp. 296–299.

== See also ==
- Chronology of the ancient Near East
