= Ashurnasirpal I =

- King of Assyria
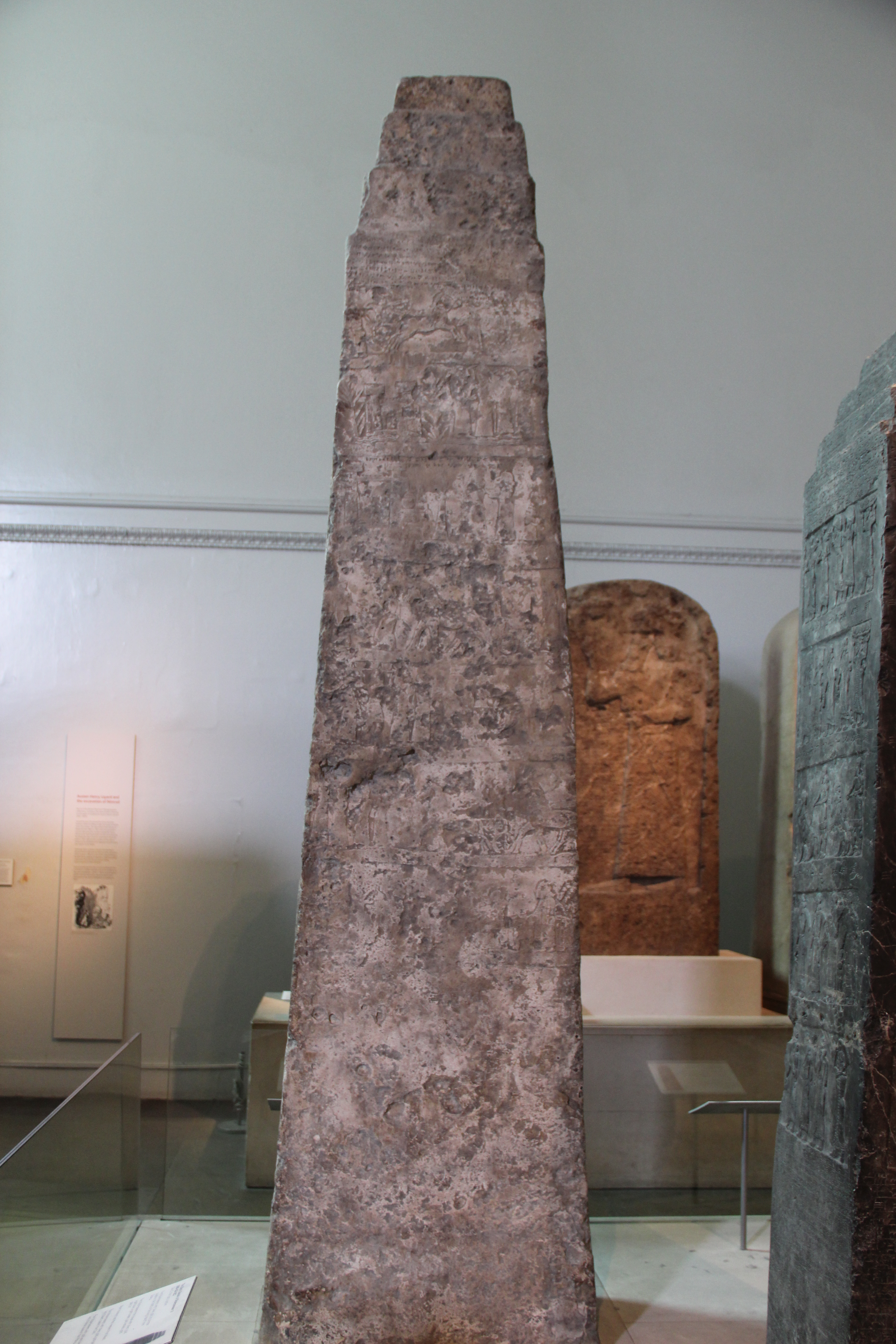
- The White Obelisk sometimes associated with Ashurnasirpal I (although it is usually dated to the reign of Ashurnasirpal II)

King of the Middle Assyrian Empire
- Reign: 1050–1031 BC
- Predecessor: Shamshi-Adad IV
- Successor: Shalmaneser II
- Issue: Shalmaneser II, Ashur-rabi II
- Father: Shamshi-Adad IV

Ashurnasirpal I (Aššur-nāṣir-apli I, inscribed ^{m}aš-šur-PAB-A, meaning "the god Assur is the protector of the heir") was the king of Assyria, 1049–1031 BC, and the 92nd to appear on the Assyrian Kinglist. He was the son and successor of Shamshi-Adad IV, and he ruled for 19 years (Note: Khorsabad Kinglist, tablet IM 60017 (excavation nos.: DS 828, DS 32-54), iv 5.) during a troubled period of Assyrian history, marked by famine and war with nomads from the deserts to the west. He is best known for his penitential prayer to Ištar of Nineveh.

== Reign ==
According to a royal hymn composed in his honor, he was born "in the mountains that nobody knows", suggesting he may have been born in exile, or perhaps a literary device, as it continues: "I was without understanding and I prayed not of your majesty". It relates that, when Ishtar appointed him to the kingship, he had restored her overthrown cult. Known from a single copy from the library of Ashurbanipal, it includes a plea to the goddess to restore him to health from the sickness that afflicted him, citing his temple-restoration, and devotions, to persuade her. It addresses Ištar of Nineveh, and Ištar of Arbil, as though they were separate deities. A second, fragmentary literary prayer thanks her for her favor.

The Synchronistic Kinglist (Note: Synchronistic Kinglist, Ass 14616c (KAV 216), iii 4.) gives his Babylonian counterpart as Kashshu-nadin-ahi (c. 1006–1004 BC), but probably only for stylistic purposes as there seems to have been no recorded contact between the kingdoms during this period.

=== Ashur ===
A single short brick-inscription comes from his palace in Assur, (Note: RIMA 2 A.0.92.1:1.) which was located between the south-west front of the ziggurat and the Anu-Adad temple. The "White Obelisk" (Note: White Obelisk, BM 118807.) is sometimes attributed to him by historians, but more usually to his later namesake, Ashurnasirpal II, because its internal content (hunting, military campaigns, etc.) better matches what is known about his reign.

=== Succession ===
He was succeeded by his son, Shalmaneser II, who mentions him in one of his own inscriptions (Note: RIMA 2 A.0.93.1:4.) and later by another son, the long-reigning Aššur-rabi II.

== See also ==
- White Obelisk of Ashurnasirpal I

== Inscriptions ==
Preceded by Shamshi-Adad IV	King of Assyria; 1050–1031 BC	Succeeded by Shalmaneser II
