= Ninurta-kudurri-usur I =

Ninurta-kudurrῑ-uṣur I
- King of Babylon
- Reign: c. 983–981 BC
- Predecessor: Eulmaš-šākin-šumi
- Successor: Širikti-Šuqamuna
- House: Bῑt-Bazi Dynasty

Ninurta-kudurrῑ-uṣur I, “Ninurta protect my offspring/border” (the ambiguity may be intentional), (Note: CAD K p. 497: Ninurta-NÍG.DU-ŠEŠ.) c. 983–981 BC, was the second king of the Bῑt-Bazi or 6th Dynasty of Babylon and he reigned for three years, according to the King List A, (Note: King List A, BM 33332, iii 11.) while the Dynastic Chronicle (Note: Dynastic Chronicle(ABC 18), v 10.) records that he ruled for just two years. This was during an era of economic and political retrenchment.

== Biography ==
A fragment of the Assyrian Synchronistic King List (Note: Synchronistic King List, KAV 182 iii 11 excavation reference Ass. 13956dh.) names Ashur-nirari IV as his contemporary, rather than Ashur-rabi II who better matches the chronology currently favored. Two Luristan arrowheads are inscribed with his name, and were probably votive offerings for temples, but there is a remote possibility that these belong to his later name-sake, who ruled for less than a year.

The Bīt-Abi-Rattaš kudurru (Note: Kudurru BM 90835 BBSt No. IX top 1-25 in the British Museum.) from the reign of Nabû-mukin-apli, c. 974–939 BC, begins with a recollection of an earlier legal document from Kār-Marduk, which may have been his capital, dated to his second year. It concerns a manslaughter settlement, where one Arad-Sibitti has killed the female slave (Note: ḫarmītu, a kind of slave, possibly linked to ḫarīmtu, “prostitute” (CAD Ḫ pp. 101, 104).) of Buruša the bow-maker, ironically with an arrow. The king pronounced judgement and commanded Arad-Sibitta to give the plaintiff seven slaves in compensation and this was witnessed by seven high-ranking witnesses, of whom three were of Kassite origin and one, Ammenna, the officer, a Hurrian.

He may be represented by the eleventh king in the Prophecy A (Note: Prophecy A, reverse ii 2-9.) whose rule likewise endures for three years. This describes the apocalyptic events of the king’s reign with cities being destroyed, rebellion, hostility against Akkad, disconnection from the rites at the Ekur and Nippur, and fragmentary but ominous events involving the Amurru and weapons. He was succeeded by his brother Širikti-Šuqamuna.
