= Ashur-rabi II =

- King of Assyria

King of the Middle Assyrian Empire
- Reign: 1013–972 BC
- Predecessor: Ashur-nirari IV
- Successor: Ashur-resh-ishi II
- Issue: Ashur-resh-ishi II
- Father: Ashurnasirpal I

Aššur-rabi II, inscribed ^{m}aš-šur-RA-bi, "(the god) Aššur is great," was king of Assyria 1012–972 BC. Despite his lengthy reign (41 years), one of the longest of the Assyrian monarchs, his tenure seems to have been an unhappy one judging by the scanty and laconic references to his setbacks from later sources.

== Biography ==
He was a younger son of the earlier Assyrian monarch, Aššurnaṣirpal I. He succeeded his nephew Aššur-nerari IV's brief six year rule, and if this succession was like earlier usurpations by uncles of their nephews, it would have been a violent affair. The Assyrian Kinglist (Note: Khorsabad Kinglist, IM 60017 (excavation nos.: DS 828, DS 32-54), iv 9.) (Note: Nassouhi Kinglist, Istanbul A. 116 (Assur 8836), iv 23.) (Note: SDAS Kinglist, IM 60484, iv 9.) records his accession and genealogy but provides no further information. His construction of the Bit-nathi, part of the temple of Ištar in Nineveh, was recalled in a dedicatory cone of Aššur-nāṣir-apli II (883–859 BC) commemorating his own repair work. (Note: RIMA 2 A.0.101.58:3' and copy RIMA 2 A.0.I01.65:3'.)

Some Assyrian settlements on the Middle Euphrates were lost to the Arameans as they were able to cross the river and establish a network of autonomous but interrelated settlements that began to encroach on the Assyrian heartland. Šulmānu-ašarēdu III recalled the loss of Ana-Aššur-utēr-aṣbat (Pitru, possibly Tell Aushariye) and Mutkinu, two towns close to Til Barsip, which had originally been taken and colonized by Tiglath Pileser II around a hundred or so years earlier; in one of his inscriptions: "At the time of Aššur-rabi (II), king of Assyria, the king of Aram (Syria) took [two cities] by force—I restored these cities. I installed the Assyrians in their midst." (Note: RIMA 3 A.0.102.2 ii 37.) The king of Aram (šar_{4} KUR-a-ru-mu) is unlikely to have been Hadadezer of Zobah, in southern Syria, but a northern Aram, in or near Ḫanigalbat. His authority continued to stretch as far west as the Khabur river in northeast Syria as recorded on the cylinder (Note: RIMA 2 A.0.96.2001 clay cylinder.) of Bel-ereš, a šangû or governor of Šadikanni, somewhat contradicting the picture of Assyrian retreat and decline painted elsewhere.

His era must have stretched from the reigns of his Babylonian contemporaries, Simbar-Šipak (1025–1008 BC) to Nabû-mukin-apli (978–943 BC), although there is no extant contemporary proof of contact which might help fix this chronology more precisely. The Synchronistic Kinglist (Note: Synchronistic Kinglist, Ass 14616c (KAV 216), iii 7.) gives his contemporary as Širikti-šuqamuna, a king of Babylonia who reigned just 3 months c. 985 BC. Severe distress and famine was recorded under Kaššu-nādin-aḫi (c. 1006–1004 BC), the midpoint in Aššur-rabi's reign, and this possibly points to the underlying cause of the Aramean migration.

He was followed on the throne by his son, the equally obscure Aššur-reši-išši II, who ruled for five years.

== Inscriptions ==
Preceded by Ashur-nirari IV	King of Assyria; 1013–972 BC	Succeeded by Ashur-resh-ishi II
