= Nabû-mukin-apli =

- King of Babylon
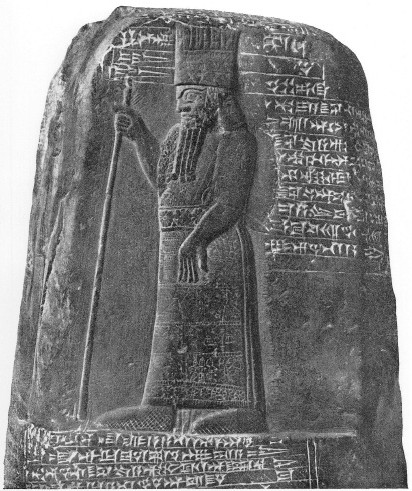
- Kudurru of the time of Nabû-mukin-apli (Note: Kudurru BM 90835, BBSt LXVII, in the British Museum.)
- Reign: c. 974–939 BC
- Predecessor: Mar-biti-apla-uṣur; Dynasty of Elam
- Successor: Ninurta-kudurri-uṣur II
- House: Dynasty of E

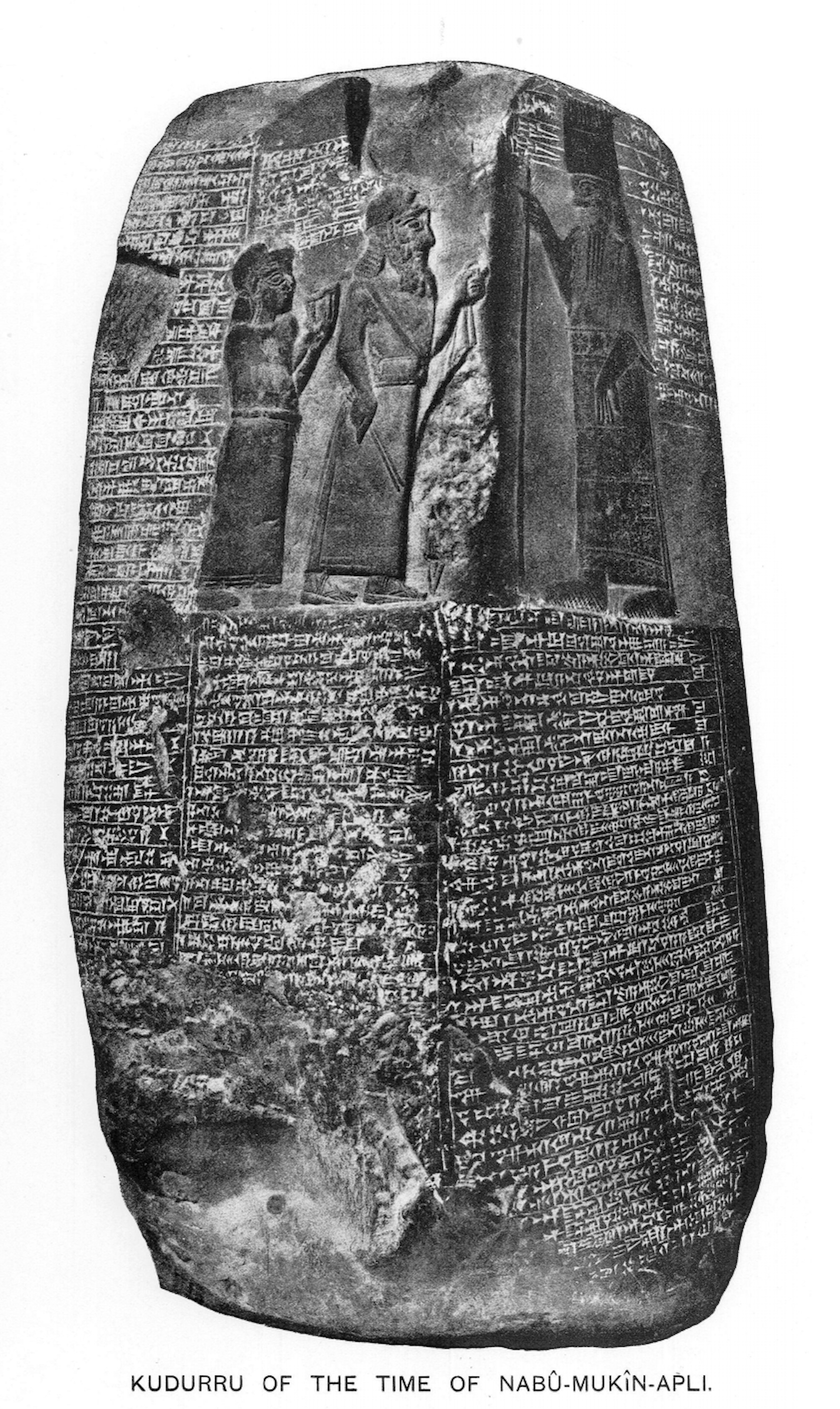
Stele of Nabu-Mukin-Apli

Nabû-mukin-apli, typically inscribed ^{d}AG-DU-A, “Nabû (is) establisher of a legitimate heir,” ruled c. 974–939 BC, founded Babylon’s 8th dynasty, the so-called Dynasty of E, and ruled for thirty-six years. (Note: Babylonian King List A, tablet BM 33332 iii 15 in the British Museum.) The Synchronistic Kinglist records him as a contemporary of the Assyrian king Tiglath-Pileser II. (Note: The Synchronistic Kinglist A.117, KAV 216 (Ass. 14616c), iii 9 (İstanbul Arkeoloji Műzeleri) and also fragments KAV 10 (VAT 11261, in the Vorderasiatisches Museum Berlin) ii 3 KAV 182 (Ass. 13956dh) iii 6.) His reign was plagued by Aramean invasions, resulting in Babylon being cut off from its agricultural hinterland for several years and consequently being unable to celebrate the new year festival.

== Biography ==
His reign falls in the midst of the Babylonian dark age and consequently his ancient sources are meager. He is mentioned in the Eclectic Chronicle (Note: Chronicle 24, tablet BM 27859, lines 17 and 18.) but without any surviving historical information. The Religious Chronicle (Note: The Religious Chronicle (ABC 17), tablet BM 35968, iii 1 – iv 10.) provides the most detail about his reign. The Akitu festival, or New Year’s festival of Marduk and Nabû, was interrupted several times, indeed for a stretch of nine straight years, because the “Aramaeans were belligerent.” Nabu's shrine is in the neighboring city of Borsippa and the festival seemed to involve the transport of cultic idols to the city of Babylon. The Kaldu (Chaldeans) migrated into Babylonia, and settled in the far southeast of Babylonia just after his reign.

A kudurru or boundary stone from Sippar (pictured), in southern Iraq, records a legal settlement, in his 25th year, of a feud over an estate in the district of the city of Sha-mamitu. It had formerly been the property of Arad-Sibitti, a provincial governor, and his cash-strapped Kassite family, the bīt-Abi-Rattaš, but had passed through marriage to the family of Buruša, a bow-maker. To complicate things, Arad-Sibitti had inadvertently killed Buruša’s slave with an arrow during the earlier reign of Ninurta-kudurri-uṣur I, c. 983–981 BC. Buruša had to pay 887 shekels to secure his title against the various liens imposed by Arad-Sibitti’s creditors. The king’s three sons are listed as witnesses to the settlement. A recently identified kudurru from the east of the Tigris in the Diyala region on the Mingatu-karītu canal is dated to his 16th year and details the sales of two plots of land. There is another kudurru fragment (Note: Kudurru CBS 13873 (University Museum Philadelphia).) but it is badly damaged and gives no useful information concerning his reign. A single unpublished economic text in the Musée d'Art et d'Histoire, Geneva, Switzerland, is dated to his reign.

His younger son, Rīmūt-ilī, acted as šatam ekurrāti, overseer of the temples. He was succeeded by his other sons, firstly Ninurta-kudurri-uṣur II, for 8 months, and then Mar-biti-aḫḫe-idinna for an as yet undetermined period.
