= Ashur-dan II =

King of Assyria

- King of Assyria; King of the Universe

King of the Middle Assyrian Empire
- Reign: 934–912 BC
- Predecessor: Tiglath Pileser II
- Successor: Adad-nirari II (Neo-Assyrian Empire)
- Father: Tiglath Pileser II

Ashur-Dan II (Aššur-dān) (934–912 BC), son of Tiglath Pileser II, was the last king of the interregnum between the Middle Assyrian Empire, and the birthing of the Neo-Assyrian Empire. He was best known for recapturing previously held Assyrian territory in Anatolia, Levant and Zagros and shoring up Assyria's natural borders, in a line from Tur Abdin, Harran, Kiultepe, Merida and Hakkari across southeast Anatolia in the north, the Khabur delta and Hassakeh region to the west, Zagros Mountains to the east and central Mesopotamia to the south. The reclaimed territory through his conquest was fortified with horses, ploughs, and grain stores. His military and economic expansions benefited four subsequent generations of kings that replicated his model.

== Background ==
The direction of the campaigns conducted by Assyrian kings and the means of reconstructing chronology of events from the period of 841–745 and beyond are found in one type of eponym list, commonly known as an Eponym Chronicle. The Assyrian royal annals add to this skeleton outline significantly. Annals are still preserved for all but the last few kings. There are no letters available from this period, however administrative and legal documents exist. For Ashur-Dan II, whose annals are only preserved in fragments, certain characteristics of Assyrian military can be observed. He followed the description of his military exploits by the count of wild animals (wild bulls, elephants, and lions) that he had hunted and killed, which traditionally characterized Assyrian kings as protective and heroic. The accounts conclude with Ashur-Dan's building activities, stressing that he did not exploit the spoils of his campaign to enrich himself, but rather to honour and exalt the gods.

== Accomplishments ==
The fragmentary annals suggest Ashur-Dan was the first king to conduct regular military campaigns in over a century. His military campaigns primarily focused on northern territories along mountainous terrain that made controlling it problematic. These areas were vital because they lay close to the Assyrian heartland and thus were vulnerable to enemy attacks. Furthermore, several important routes leading to Anatolia ran through these areas and were a source of crucial metals. In one of his more significant victories, Ashur-Dan captured the king of the northeastern state of Katmuḫu(kadmuhu), flayed him, and displayed his skin publicly on the walls of Arbela, then replaced him with a loyal subordinate and took valuable bronze, tin, and precious stones from Kadmuhu.

Another chief concern of Ashur-Dan’s known military campaigns was the Aramaeans to the west. The fragmentary annals state that Ashur-Dan believed he was rightfully retaking Assyrian territory occupied by the Aramaeans in the recent past. He also claimed that he had brought back Assyrians who had fled due to starvation to resettle the lands. The impression conveyed through these annals was that the Aramaeans had enslaved and slaughtered Assyrians and seized their land.

Eastwards, the Zagros foothills down to the lower Zab, were crucial strategic points where Assyrian kings frequently campaigned, both for Assyrian security and to safeguard the limited routes through the mountains. This was a key commercial point for Assyrians, through which they received horses and valuable lapis lazuli mined in northeast Afghanistan.

After re-establishing Assyria's borders, Ashur-Dan went through an extensive period of resettlement and land reclamation. Ashur-Dan also left his mark on the Craftsman’s Gate and the New Palace by performing construction on both sites. His basic ideology and strategy laid the foundation for the Neo-Assyrian period, which was elaborated by his successors. He was able to establish a uniformly structured political entity with well-defined and well-structured borders. His conquest is presented as a return of stability and prosperity after a perceived unlawful period of intrusion. The displaced Assyrians were rehoused in towns and the resettled lands were fortified with agricultural growth. The decline of Early Assyria was largely due to a lack of systematic administration and an influx of Arameans. Ashur-Dan established government offices in all provinces, creating a strong administrative presence in the areas under his rule. At the end of the millennium, Assyria was surrounded by enemies to the south, in and around Babylonia, to the west by the Arameans in Syria, and to the north and east by the Nairi people. Ashur-Dan successfully expanded Assyrian territory surrounded by formidable foes and established provincial administration that once again transformed Assyria from a territorial power to an imperial power known as the Neo-Assyrian Empire. The Neo-Assyrian Empire was a diverse and multi-ethnic state from people from many tribes of different origins. It was a uniformly structured political entity with well-defined and well-guarded borders, and the Assyrian kings certainly regarded it as a unified whole, "the land of Aššur", whose territory they constantly strove to expand. To the outside world, it likewise was a unified, monolithic whole, whose inhabitants were unhesitatingly identified as Assyrians regardless of their ethnic backgrounds.

== Succession ==
Ashur-Dan was succeeded by his son, Adad-nirari II (911–891 BC). He continued to campaign repeatedly in areas that his father had attacked, expanding on his father’s achievements. He ruled two years fewer than his father, but the number and range of his military campaigns were greater. To the west he marched as far as the Balikh river, to the south as far as the middle Euphrates, to the north as far as the southern regions of Lake Van, and to the east he penetrated the Zagros mountains. Three versions of his annals are known. Altogether the annals cover campaigns from the accession to the eighteenth regnal year.

Preceded by Tiglath-Pileser II	King of Assyria; 934–912 BCE	Succeeded by Adad-nirari II
