= Tukulti-Ninurta II =

King of Assyria

- King of Assyria; King of the Four Corners of the World; King of the Universe
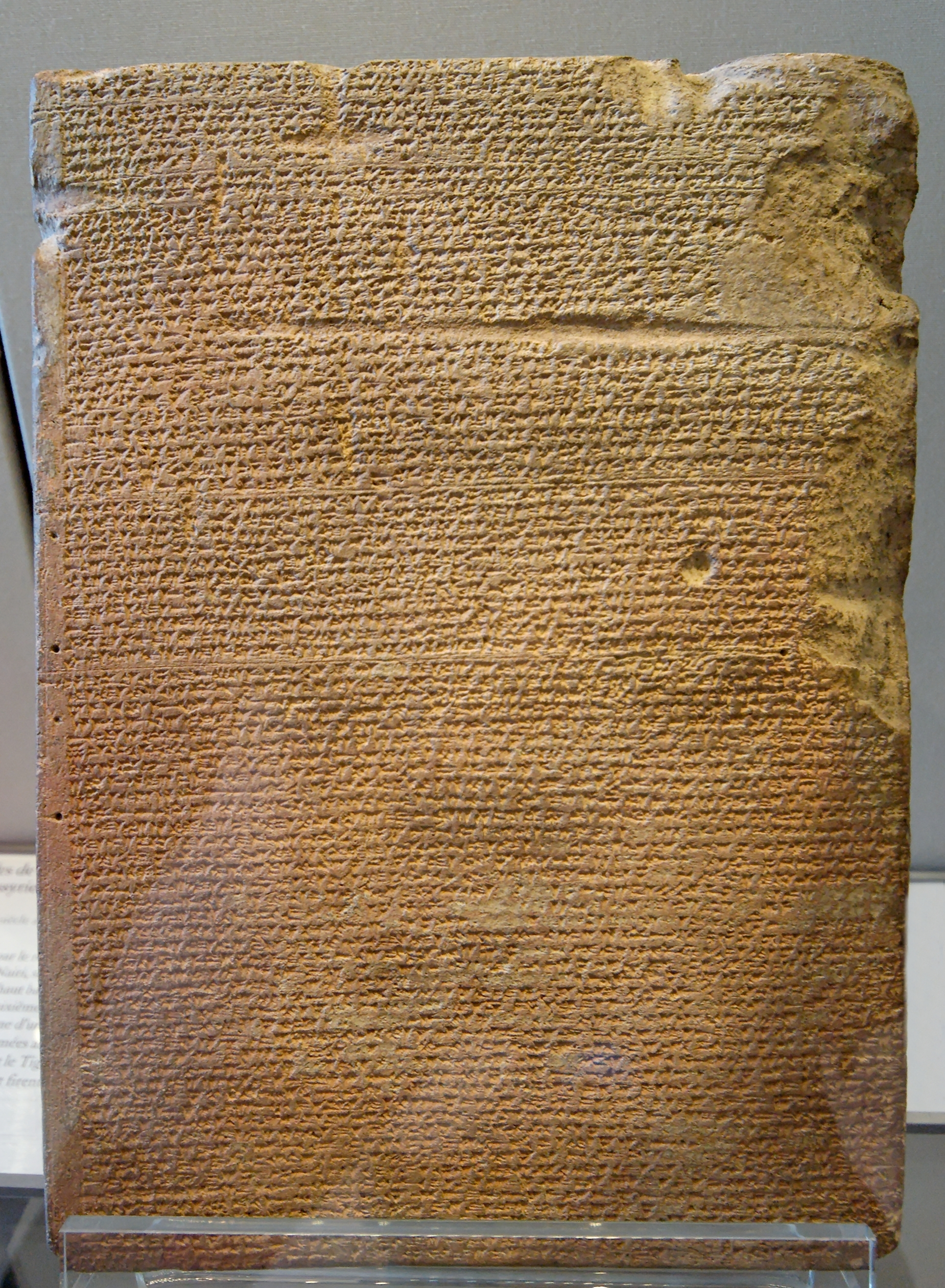
- Annals of Tukulti-Ninurta II

King of the Neo-Assyrian Empire
- Reign: 7 regnal years 890–884 BCE
- Predecessor: Adad-Nirari II
- Successor: Ashurnasirpal II
- Born: 10th century BCE
- Died: 884 BCE
- Issue: Ashurnasirpal II
- Father: Adad-Nirari II
- Mother: Babylonian princess, daughter of Nabu-shuma-ukin I (?)

Tukulti-Ninurta II (meaning: "my trust is in [the warrior god] Ninurta") was King of Assyria from 890 BCE to 884 BCE. He was the second king of the Neo Assyrian Empire.

== History ==
His father was Adad-nirari II, the first king of the Neo-Assyrian period. Tukulti-Ninurta consolidated the gains made by his father over the Neo-Hittites, Babylonians and Arameans, and successfully campaigned in the Zagros Mountains of Iran, subjugating the newly arrived Iranian peoples of the area, the Persians and Medes, during his brief reign.

Tukulti-Ninurta II was victorious over Ammi-Ba'al, the king of Bit-Zamani, and then entered into a treaty with him (which included prohibitions against selling horses to Assyria's foes), as a result of which Bit-Zamani became an ally, and in fact a vassal of Assyria. Ammi-Ba'al remained in power, but from that moment on, he had to support Tukulti-Ninurta II during his military expeditions to the Upper Tigris against the Hurrians and Urartians in Nairi.

Tukulti-Ninurta II developed both Nineveh and Assur, in which he improved the city walls, built palaces and temples and decorated the gardens with scenes of his military achievements.

His son, Ashurnasirpal II, succeeded him.

Preceded by Adad-nirari II	King of Assyria; 890–884 BC	Succeeded by Ashurnasirpal II
