= Adad-nirari II =

Assyrian king (911–891 BCE)

Adad-nīrārī II
- King of Assyria; King of the Four Corners of the World; King of the Universe

King of the Neo-Assyrian Empire
- Reign: 21 regnal years 911–891 BCE
- Predecessor: Ashur-dan II (Middle Assyrian Empire)
- Successor: Tukulti-Ninurta II
- Born: 10th century BCE
- Died: 891 BCE
- Spouse: Babylonian princess, daughter of Nabu-shuma-ukin I
- Issue: Tukulti-Ninurta II
- Father: Ashur-dan II

Adad-nīrārī II (also spelled Adad-nērārī, which means "Adad (the storm god) is my help") reigned from 911 BCE to 891 BCE. He was the first King of Assyria in the Neo-Assyrian Empire. He instigated the first renewed period of major expansion following that of the Middle Assyrian Empire which had begun in 1365 BCE under Ashur-uballit I and ended after the death of Ashur-bel-kala in 1053 BCE.

== Biography ==
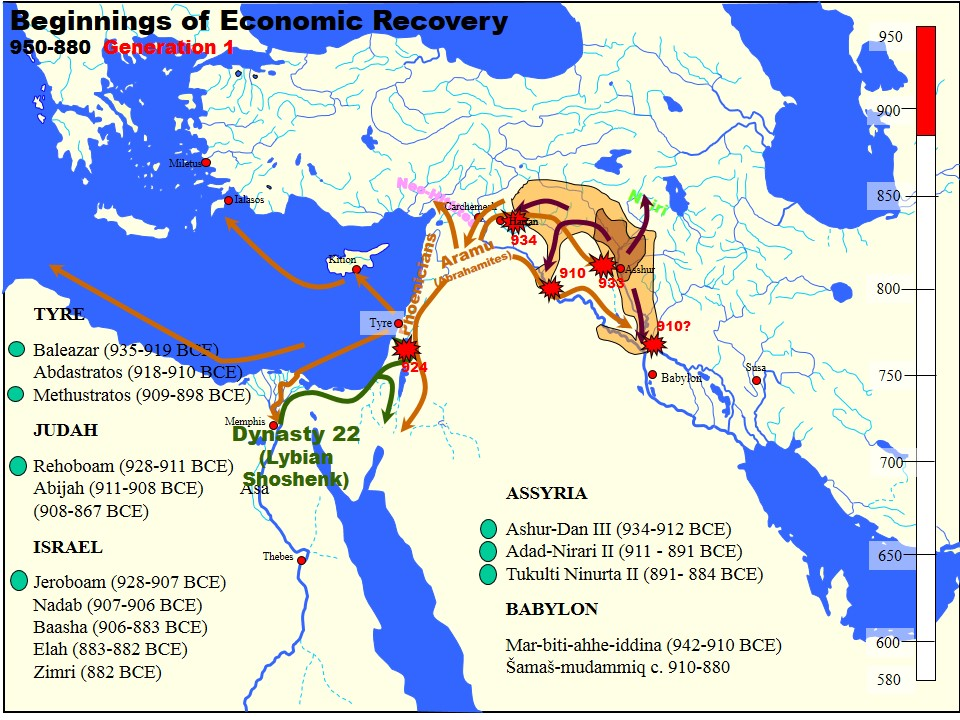
Economic recovery in the reign of Adad-nīrārī II

Adad-nīrārī II's father was Ashur-dan II, whom he succeeded after a minor dynastic struggle. It is probable that the accession encouraged revolts amongst Assyria's nominal vassals in nearby regions of Anatolia, the Levant and Iran.

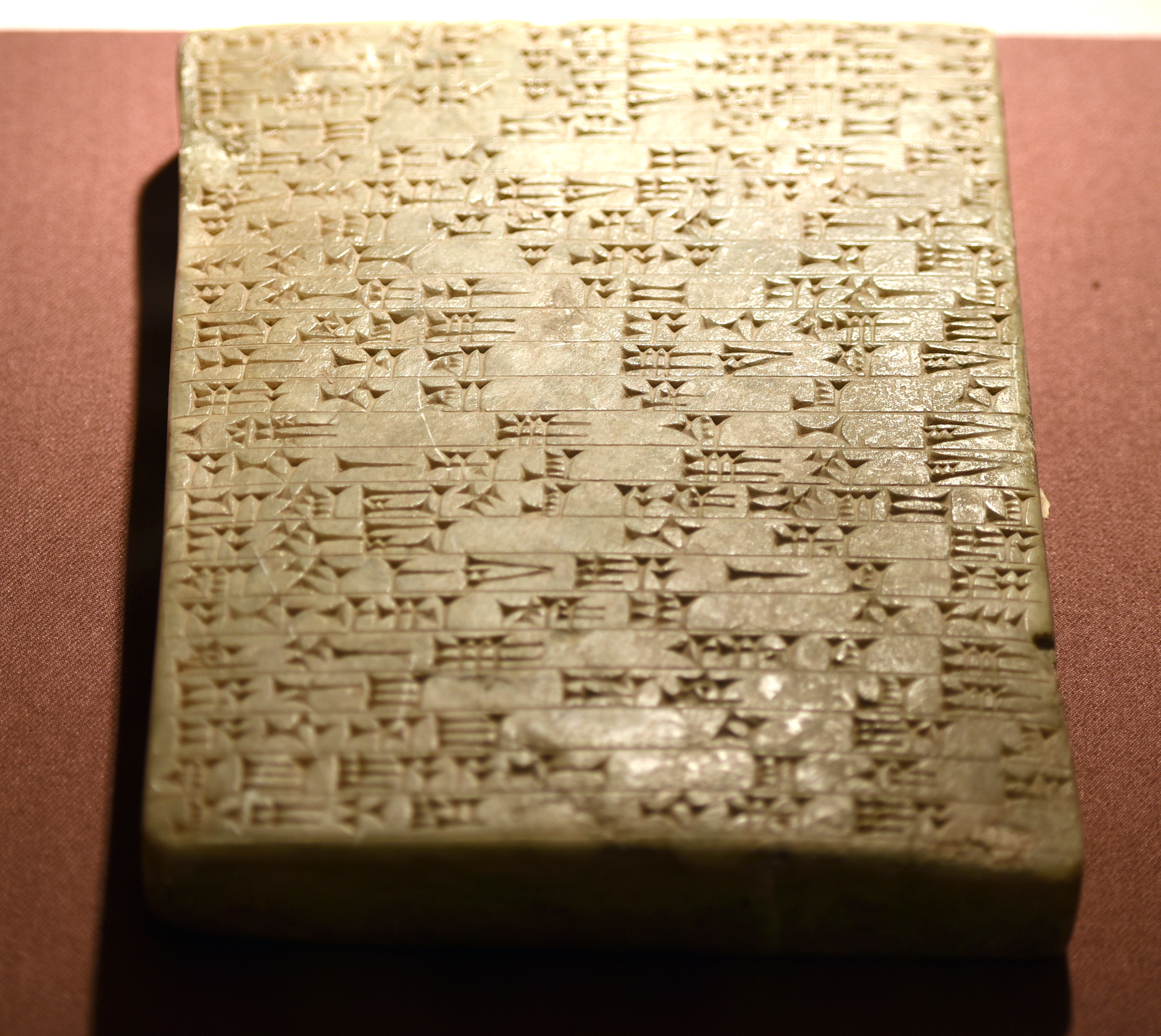
Inscribed stone tablet of Adad-nīrārī II from Assur, Iraq Museum

He firmly subjugated the areas previously under only nominal Assyrian vassalage, conquering and deporting troublesome Arameans following a battle at the junction of the Khabur and Euphrates rivers in 910 BC. After subduing Neo-Hittite and Hurrian populations in eastern Anatolia, Adad-nīrārī II then twice attacked and defeated Shamash-mudammiq of Babylonia, annexing a large area of land north of the Diyala River and the towns of Hīt and Zanqu in mid Mesopotamia in the same year. He made further gains over Babylonia under Nabu-shuma-ukin I later in his reign. He also campaigned to the west, subjugating the Aramean cities of Kadmuh and Nisibin and their territories. Along with vast amounts of treasure collected, he also secured the Kabur river region. His reign was a period of returning prosperity to the Middle East region following expansion of Phoenician and Aramaean trade routes, linking Anatolia, Egypt under the Libyan 22nd Dynasty, Mesopotamia and the Mediterranean.

Adad-nīrārī II's son was named Tukulti-Ninurta II who continued to successfully expand Assyrian territory and wage war against Assyria's enemies.

Because of the existence of full eponym lists from Adad-nīrārī II's reign down to the middle of the reign of Ashurbanipal in the 7th century BC, year one of his reign in 911 BC is perhaps the first event in ancient Near Eastern history which can be dated to an exact year, although the Assyrian King List is generally considered to be quite accurate for several centuries before Adad-nīrārī's reign, and scholars generally agree on a single set of dates back to Ashur-resh-ishi I in the late 12th century BC.

| Preceded by Ashur-dan II | King of Assyria; 911–891 BC | Succeeded by Tukulti-Ninurta II |
