= Tiglath-Pileser II =

- King of Assyria

King of the Middle Assyrian Empire
- Reign: 967–935 BC
- Predecessor: Ashur-resh-ishi II
- Successor: Ashur-dan II
- Issue: Ashur-dan II
- Father: Ashur-resh-ishi II

Tiglath-Pileser II (from the Hebraic form (Note: Spelled as "תִּגְלַת פִּלְאֶסֶר" "Tiglath-Pileser" in the Books of Kings (2Kings 15:29) or as "תִּלְּגַת פִּלְנְאֶסֶר" "Tilgath-Pilneser" in the Books of Chronicles (2Chronicles 28:20).) of Akkadian Tukultī-apil-Ešarra) was King of Assyria from 967 BCE, when he succeeded his father Ashur-resh-ishi II, until his death in 935 BCE, when he was succeeded by his son Ashur-dan II. Little is known about his reign, although his successor laid the foundations for the Neo-Assyrian Empire.

The city of Gidara (modern Buğday) may have been lost during his reign to the Temanites, an Aramaic tribe.

== See also ==
- Tiglath-Pileser I
- Tiglath-Pileser III

== Footnotes ==
Preceded by Ashur-resh-ishi II	King of Assyria; 967–935 BCE	Succeeded by Ashur-dan II
