= Babylonia =

Ancient Amorite-Akkadian state in Mesopotamia

Babylonia: 𒆳𒌵𒆠 (Akkadian); 𒆳𒆍𒀭𒊏𒆠 (Akkadian)
- 1894 BC–539 BC
- The extent of the Babylonian Empire at the start and end of Hammurabi's reign, in modern-day Iraq.
- Capital: Babylon
- Official languages: Akkadian; Sumerian; Aramaic
- Religion: Babylonian religion
- History
  - Established: 1894 BC
  - Disestablished: 539 BC
Preceded by	Succeeded by
Sumer; Akkadian Empire	Achaemenid Empire
- Today part of: Iraq

Babylonia (/ˌbæbɪˈloʊniə/; Akkadian: 𒆳𒆍𒀭𒊏𒆠, romanized: māt Akkadī; 𒆳𒆍𒀭𒊏𒆠, māt Bābilim) was an ancient Akkadian-speaking state and cultural area based on the city of Babylon in central-southern Mesopotamia (present-day Iraq and parts of Syria). It emerged as an Akkadian-populated but Amorite-ruled state c. 1894 BC. During the reign of Hammurabi and afterwards, Babylonia was retrospectively called "the country of Akkad" (māt Akkadī in Akkadian), a deliberate archaism in reference to the previous glory of the Akkadian Empire. It was often involved in rivalry with the culturally and linguistically-related state of Assyria in Upper Mesopotamia, which was also an Akkadian-populated and derived civilization, and with Elam to the east. Babylonia briefly became the major power in the region after Hammurabi (fl. c. 1792–1752 BC middle chronology, or c. 1696–1654 BC, short chronology) created a short-lived empire, succeeding the earlier Akkadian Empire, Third Dynasty of Ur, and Old Assyrian Empire. The Babylonian Empire rapidly fell apart after the death of Hammurabi, and reverted to a small kingdom centered around the city of Babylon.

Like Assyria, the Babylonian state retained the written Akkadian language for official use, despite its Northwest Semitic-speaking Amorite founders and Kassite successors, who spoke a language isolate. The state retained the Sumerian language in sacred texts for the Babylonian religion, but already by the time Babylon was founded, this was no longer a spoken language, having been replaced by Akkadian. The earlier Akkadian and Sumerian traditions played a major role in the descendant Babylonian and Assyrian culture, and the region would remain an important cultural centre, even under its protracted periods of outside rule.

== History ==
=== Pre-Babylonian Sumero-Akkadian period ===
Mesopotamia had already enjoyed a long history before the emergence of Babylon, with Sumerian civilization emerging in the region c. 5400 BC, and the Akkadian-speakers who would go on to form Akkad, Assyria, and Babylonia appearing somewhere between the 35th and 30th century BC.

During the 3rd millennium BC, an intimate cultural symbiosis occurred between Sumerian and Akkadian-speakers, which included widespread bilingualism. The influence of Sumerian on Akkadian and vice versa is evident in all areas, from lexical borrowing on a massive scale, to syntactic, morphological, and phonological convergence. This has prompted scholars to refer to Sumerian and Akkadian in the third millennium as a sprachbund. Akkadian gradually replaced Sumerian as the spoken language of Mesopotamia somewhere around the turn of the third and the second millennium BC (the precise timeframe being a matter of debate). From c. 5400 BC until the rise of the Akkadian Empire in the 24th century BC, Mesopotamia had been dominated by largely Sumerian cities and city states, such as Ur, Lagash, Uruk, Kish, Isin, Larsa, Adab, Eridu, Gasur, Assur, Hamazi, Akshak, Arbela and Umma, although Semitic Akkadian names began to appear on the king lists of some of these states (such as Eshnunna and Assyria) between the 29th and 25th centuries BC. Traditionally, the major religious center of all Mesopotamia was the city of Nippur where the god Enlil was supreme, and it would remain so until replaced by Babylon during the reign of Hammurabi in the mid-18th century BC. The Akkadian Empire (2334–2154 BC) saw the Akkadian Semites and Sumerians of Mesopotamia unite under one rule, and the Akkadians fully attain ascendancy over the Sumerians and indeed come to dominate much of the ancient Near East. The empire eventually disintegrated due to economic decline, climate change, and civil war, followed by attacks by the language isolate speaking Gutians from the Zagros Mountains to the northeast. Sumer rose up again with the Third Dynasty of Ur (Neo-Sumerian Empire) in the late 22nd century BC, and ejected the Gutians from southern Mesopotamia in 2161 BC as suggested by surviving tablets and astronomy simulations. They also seem to have gained ascendancy over much of the territory of the Akkadian speaking kings of Assyria in northern Mesopotamia for a time.

Followed by the collapse of the Sumerian "Ur-III" dynasty at the hands of the Elamites in 2002 BC, the Amorites, a foreign Northwest Semitic-speaking people, began to migrate into southern Mesopotamia from the northern Levant, gradually gaining control over most of southern Mesopotamia, where they formed a series of small kingdoms, while the Assyrians reasserted their independence in the north. The states of the south were unable to stem the Amorite advance, and for a time may have relied on their fellow Akkadians in Assyria for protection.

King Ilu-shuma (c. 2008–1975 BC) of the Old Assyrian period (2025–1750 BC) in a known inscription describes his exploits to the south as follows:

The freedom (Note: Freedom = Akk. addurāru.) of the Akkadians and their children I established. I purified their copper. I established their freedom from the border of the marshes and Ur and Nippur, Awal, and Kish, Der of the goddess Ishtar, as far as the City of (Ashur).

Past scholars originally extrapolated from this text that it means he defeated the invading Amorites to the south and Elamites to the east, but there is no explicit record of that, and some scholars believe the Assyrian kings were merely giving preferential trade agreements to the south.

These policies, whether military, economic or both, were continued by his successors Erishum I and Ikunum.

However, when Sargon I (1920–1881 BC) succeeded as king in Assyria in 1920 BC, he eventually withdrew Assyria from the region, preferring to concentrate on continuing the vigorous expansion of Assyrian colonies in Anatolia at the expense of the Hurrians and Hattians and the Amorite inhabited Levant, and eventually southern Mesopotamia fell to the Amorites. During the first centuries of what is called the "Amorite period", the most powerful city-states in the south were Isin, Eshnunna and Larsa, together with Assyria in the north.

=== First Babylonian dynasty – Amorite dynasty, 1894–1595 BC ===
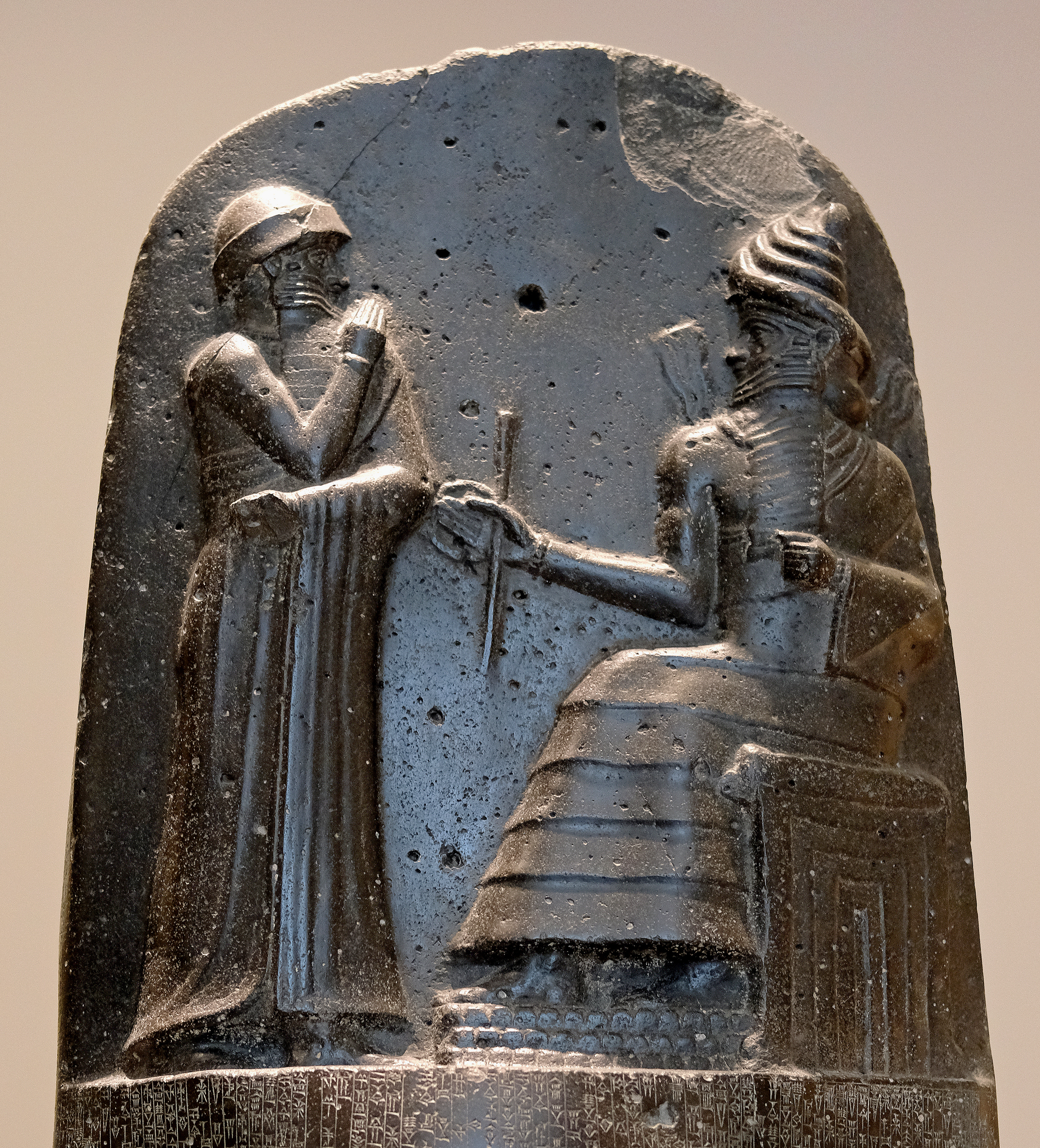
Hammurabi (standing), depicted as receiving his royal insignia from Shamash (or possibly Marduk). Hammurabi holds his hands over his mouth as a sign of prayer (relief on the upper part of the stele of Hammurabi's code of laws).

Around 1894 BC, an Amorite chieftain named Sumu-abum appropriated a tract of land which included the then relatively small city of Babylon from the neighbouring minor city-state of Kazallu, of which it had initially been a territory, turning his newly acquired lands into a state in its own right. His reign was concerned with establishing statehood amongst a sea of other minor city-states and kingdoms in the region. However, Sumu-abum appears never to have bothered to give himself the title of King of Babylon, suggesting that Babylon itself was still only a minor town or city, and not worthy of kingship.

He was followed by Sumu-la-El, Sabium, and Apil-Sin, each of whom ruled in the same vague manner as Sumu-abum, with no reference to kingship of Babylon itself being made in any written records of the time. Sin-Muballit was the first of these Amorite rulers to be regarded officially as a king of Babylon, and then on only one single clay tablet. Under these kings, Babylonia remained a small nation which controlled very little territory, and was overshadowed by neighbouring kingdoms that were both older, larger, and more powerful, such as Isin, Larsa, Assyria to the north and Elam to the east in ancient Iran. The Elamites occupied huge swathes of southern Mesopotamia, and the early Amorite rulers were largely held in vassalage to Elam.

==== Empire of Hammurabi ====
Babylon remained a minor town in a small state until the reign of its sixth Amorite ruler, Hammurabi, during 1792–1750 BC (or c. 1728–1686 BC in the short chronology). He conducted major building work in Babylon, expanding it from a small town into a great city worthy of kingship. A very efficient ruler, he established a bureaucracy, with taxation and centralized government. Hammurabi freed Babylon from Elamite dominance, and indeed drove the Elamites from southern Mesopotamia entirely, invading Elam itself. He then systematically conquered southern Mesopotamia, including the cities of Isin, Larsa, Eshnunna, Kish, Lagash, Nippur, Borsippa, Ur, Uruk, Umma, Adab, Sippar, Rapiqum, and Eridu. His conquests gave the region stability after turbulent times, and coalesced the patchwork of small states into a single nation; it is only from the time of Hammurabi that southern Mesopotamia acquired the name Babylonia.

Hammurabi turned his disciplined armies eastwards and invaded the region which a thousand years later became Iran, conquering Elam, Gutium, Lullubi, Turukku and Kassites. To the west, he conquered the Amorite states of the Levant (modern Syria and Jordan) including the powerful kingdoms of Mari and Yamhad.

Hammurabi then entered into a protracted war with the Old Assyrian Empire for control of Mesopotamia and dominance of the Near East. Assyria had extended control over much of the Hurrian and Hattian parts of southeast Anatolia from the 21st century BC, and from the latter part of the 20th century BC had asserted itself over the northeast Levant and central Mesopotamia. After a protracted struggle over decades with the powerful Kingdom of Upper Mesopotamia kings Shamshi-Adad I and Ishme-Dagan I, Hammurabi forced their successor Mut-Ashkur to pay tribute to Babylon c. 1751 BC, giving Babylonia control over Assyria's centuries-old Hattian and Hurrian colonies in Anatolia.

One of Hammurabi's most important and lasting works was the compilation of the Babylonian law code, which improved the much earlier codes of Sumer, Akkad and Assyria. This was made by order of Hammurabi after the expulsion of the Elamites and the settlement of his kingdom. In 1901, a copy of the Code of Hammurabi was discovered on a stele by Jacques de Morgan and Jean-Vincent Scheil at Susa in Elam, where it had later been taken as plunder. That copy is now in the Louvre.

From before 3000 BC until the reign of Hammurabi, the major cultural and religious center of southern Mesopotamia had been the ancient city of Nippur, where the god Enlil was supreme. Hammurabi transferred this dominance to Babylon, making Marduk supreme in the pantheon of southern Mesopotamia (with the god Ashur, and to some degree Ishtar, remaining the long-dominant deity in northern Mesopotamian Assyria). The city of Babylon became known as a "holy city" where any legitimate ruler of southern Mesopotamia had to be crowned, and the city was also revered by Assyria for these religious reasons. Hammurabi turned what had previously been a minor administrative town into a large, powerful and influential city, extended its rule over the entirety of southern Mesopotamia, and erected a number of buildings.

The Amorite-ruled Babylonians, like their predecessor states, engaged in regular trade with the Amorite and Canaanite city-states to the west, with Babylonian officials or troops sometimes passing to the Levant and Canaan, and Amorite merchants operating freely throughout Mesopotamia. The Babylonian monarchy's western connections remained strong for quite some time. Ammi-Ditana, great-grandson of Hammurabi, still titled himself "king of the land of the Amorites". Ammi-Ditana's father and son also bore Amorite names: Abi-Eshuh and Ammi-Saduqa.

==== Decline ====
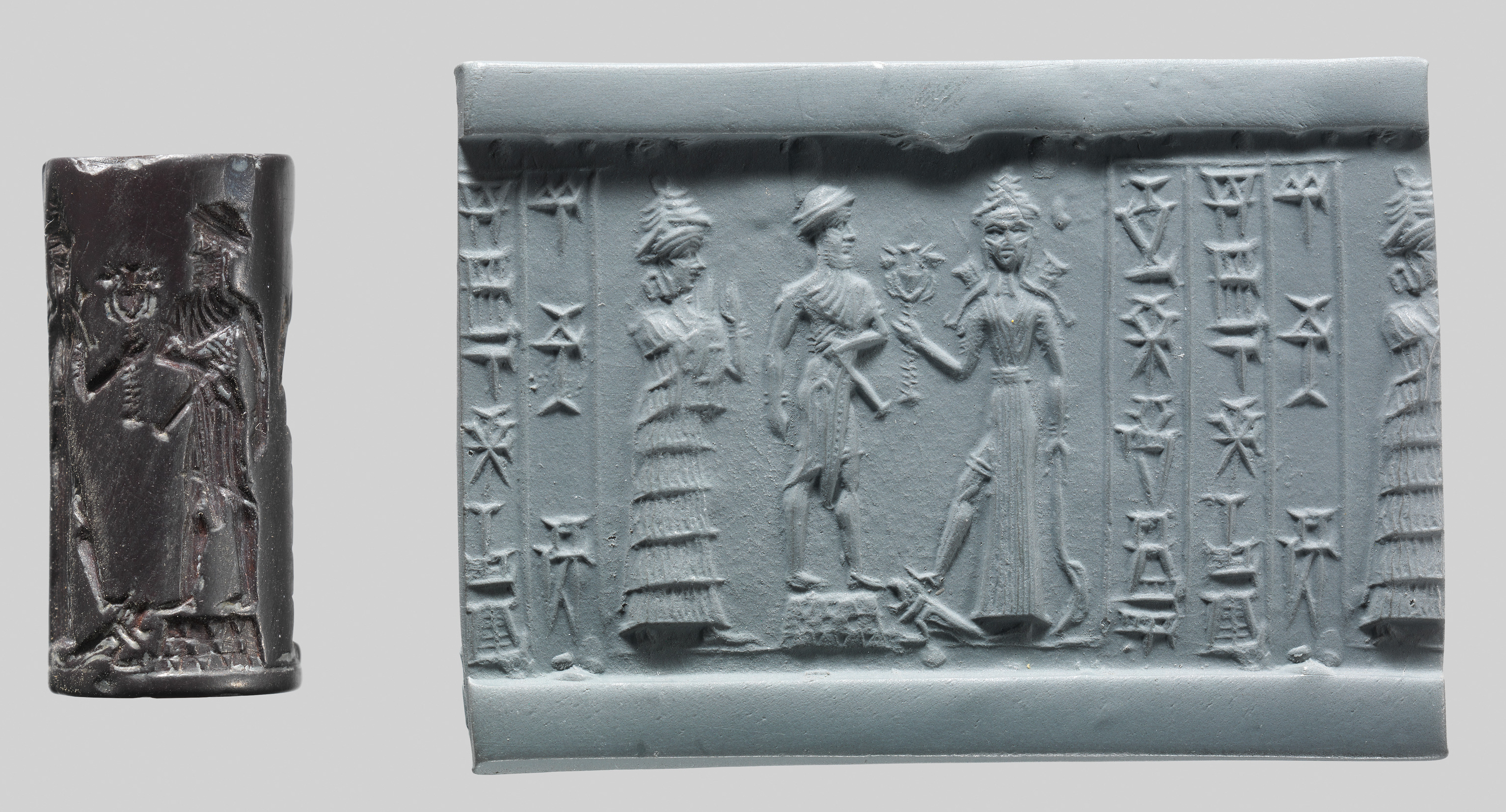
Cylinder seal, c. 18th–17th century BC. Babylonia.

Southern Mesopotamia had no natural, defensible boundaries, making it vulnerable to attack. After the death of Hammurabi, his empire began to disintegrate rapidly. Under his successor Samsu-iluna (1749–1712 BC) the far south of Mesopotamia was lost to a native Akkadian-speaking king Ilum-ma-ili who ejected the Amorite-ruled Babylonians. The south became the native Sealand Dynasty, remaining free of Babylon for the next 272 years.

Both the Babylonians and their Amorite rulers were driven from Assyria to the north by an Assyrian-Akkadian governor named Puzur-Sin c. 1740 BC, who regarded king Mut-Ashkur as both a foreign Amorite and a former lackey of Babylon. After six years of civil war in Assyria, a native king named Adasi seized power c. 1735 BC, and went on to appropriate former Babylonian and Amorite territory in central Mesopotamia, as did his successor Bel-bani.

Amorite rule survived in a much reduced Babylon, Samshu-iluna's successor Abi-Eshuh made a vain attempt to recapture the Sealand Dynasty for Babylon, but met defeat at the hands of king Damqi-ilishu II. By the end of his reign Babylonia had shrunk to the small and relatively weak nation it had been upon its foundation, although the city itself was far larger and opulent than the small town it had been prior to the rise of Hammurabi.

He was followed by Ammi-Ditana and then Ammi-Saduqa, both of whom were in too weak a position to make any attempt to regain the many territories lost after the death of Hammurabi, contenting themselves with peaceful building projects in Babylon itself.

Samsu-Ditana was to be the last Amorite ruler of Babylon. Early in his reign he came under pressure from the Kassites, a people speaking an apparent language isolate originating in the mountains of what is today northwest Iran. Babylon was then attacked by the Indo-European-speaking, Anatolia-based Hittites in 1595 BC. Shamshu-Ditana was overthrown following the "sack of Babylon" by the Hittite king Mursili I. The Hittites did not remain for long, but the destruction wrought by them finally enabled their Kassite allies to gain control.

==== Sack of Babylon and ancient Near East chronology ====
Sack of Babylon
- Part of Campaigns of Mursili I
Date	c. 1595 BC
Location	Babylonia, modern-day Iraq
Result	Hittite victory

Belligerents
Hittite Empire	Babylon

Commanders and leaders
Mursili I	Samsu-Ditana

Casualties and losses
Unknown	Unknown

The date of the sack of Babylon by the Hittites under king Mursili I is considered crucial to the various calculations of the early chronology of the ancient Near East, as it is taken as a fixed point in the discussion. Suggestions for its precise date vary by as much as 230 years, corresponding to the uncertainty regarding the length of the "Dark Age" of the much later Late Bronze Age collapse, resulting in the shift of the entire Bronze Age chronology of Mesopotamia with regard to the Egyptian chronology. Possible dates for the sack of Babylon are:

- ultra-short chronology: 1499 BC
- short chronology: 1531 BC
- low middle chronology: 1587 BC
- middle chronology: 1595 BC (probably the most commonly used, and often seen as having the most support)
- long chronology: 1651 BC (favored by some astronomical events reconstruction)
- ultra-long chronology: 1736 BC

Mursili I, the Hittite king, first conquered Aleppo, capital of Yamhad kingdom, to avenge the death of his father, but his main geopolitical target was Babylon. The Mesopotamian Chronicle 40, written after 1500 BC, mentions briefly the sack of Babylon as: "During the time of Samsu-Ditana, the Hittites marched on Akkad." More details can be found in another source, the Telepinu Proclamation, a Hittite text from around 1520 BC, which states:

And then he [Mursili I] marched to Aleppo, and he destroyed Aleppo and brought captives and possessions of Aleppo to Ḫattuša. Then, however, he marched to Babylon, and he destroyed Babylon, and he defeated the Hurrian troops, and he brought captives and possessions of Babylon to Ḫattuša.

The movement of Mursili's troops was around 800 km from the conquered Aleppo to reach the Euphrates, located to the east, skirting around Assyria, and then to the south along the course of the river to reach finally Babylon. His conquest of Babylon brought to an end the dynasty of Hammurabi, and although the Hittite text, Telipinu Proclamation, does not mention Samsu-ditana, and the Babylonian Chronicle 20 does not mention a specific Hittite king either, Trevor Bryce concludes that there is no doubt that both sources refer to Mursili I and Samsu-ditana.

The Hittites, when sacking Babylon, removed the images of the gods Marduk and his consort Zarpanitu from the Esagil temple and they took them to their kingdom. The later inscription of Agum-kakrime, the Kassite king, claims he returned the images; and another later text, the Marduk Prophesy, written long after the events, mentions that the image of Marduk was in exile around twenty-four years.

After the conquest, Mursili I did not attempt to convert the whole region he had occupied from Aleppo to Babylon as a part of his kingdom; he instead made an alliance with the Kassites, and then a Kassite dynasty was established in Babylonia.

=== Kassite dynasty, 1595–1155 BC ===
The extent of the Babylonian Empire during the Kassite dynasty.

The Kassite dynasty was founded by Gandash of Mari. The Kassites, like the Amorite rulers who had preceded them, were not originally native to Mesopotamia. Rather, they had first appeared in the Zagros Mountains of what is today northwestern Iran.

The ethnic affiliation of the Kassites is unclear. Still, their language was not Semitic or Indo-European, and is thought to have been either a language isolate or possibly related to the Hurro-Urartian language family of Anatolia, although the evidence for its genetic affiliation is meager due to the scarcity of extant texts. That said, several Kassite leaders may have borne Indo-European names, and they may have had an Indo-European elite similar to the Mitanni elite that later ruled over the Hurrians of central and eastern Anatolia, while others had Semitic names.

The Kassites renamed Babylon Karduniaš and their rule lasted for 576 years, the longest dynasty in Babylonian history.

This new foreign dominion offers a striking analogy to the roughly contemporary rule of the Semitic Hyksos in ancient Egypt. Most divine attributes ascribed to the Amorite kings of Babylonia disappeared at this time; the title "god" was never given to a Kassite sovereign. Babylon continued to be the capital of the kingdom and one of the holy cities of western Asia, where the priests of the ancient Mesopotamian religion were all-powerful, and the only place where the right to inheritance of the short lived old Babylonian empire could be conferred.

Babylonia experienced short periods of relative power, but in general proved to be relatively weak under the long rule of the Kassites, and spent long periods under Assyrian and Elamite domination and interference.

It is not clear precisely when Kassite rule of Babylon began, but the Indo-European Hittites from Anatolia did not remain in Babylonia for long after the sacking of the city, and it is likely the Kassites moved in soon afterwards. Agum II took the throne for the Kassites in 1595 BC, and ruled a state that extended from Iran to the middle Euphrates; The new king retained peaceful relations with Erishum III, the native Mesopotamian king of Assyria, but successfully went to war with the Hittite Empire, and twenty-four years after, the Hittites took the sacred statue of Marduk, he recovered it and declared the god equal to the Kassite deity Shuqamuna.

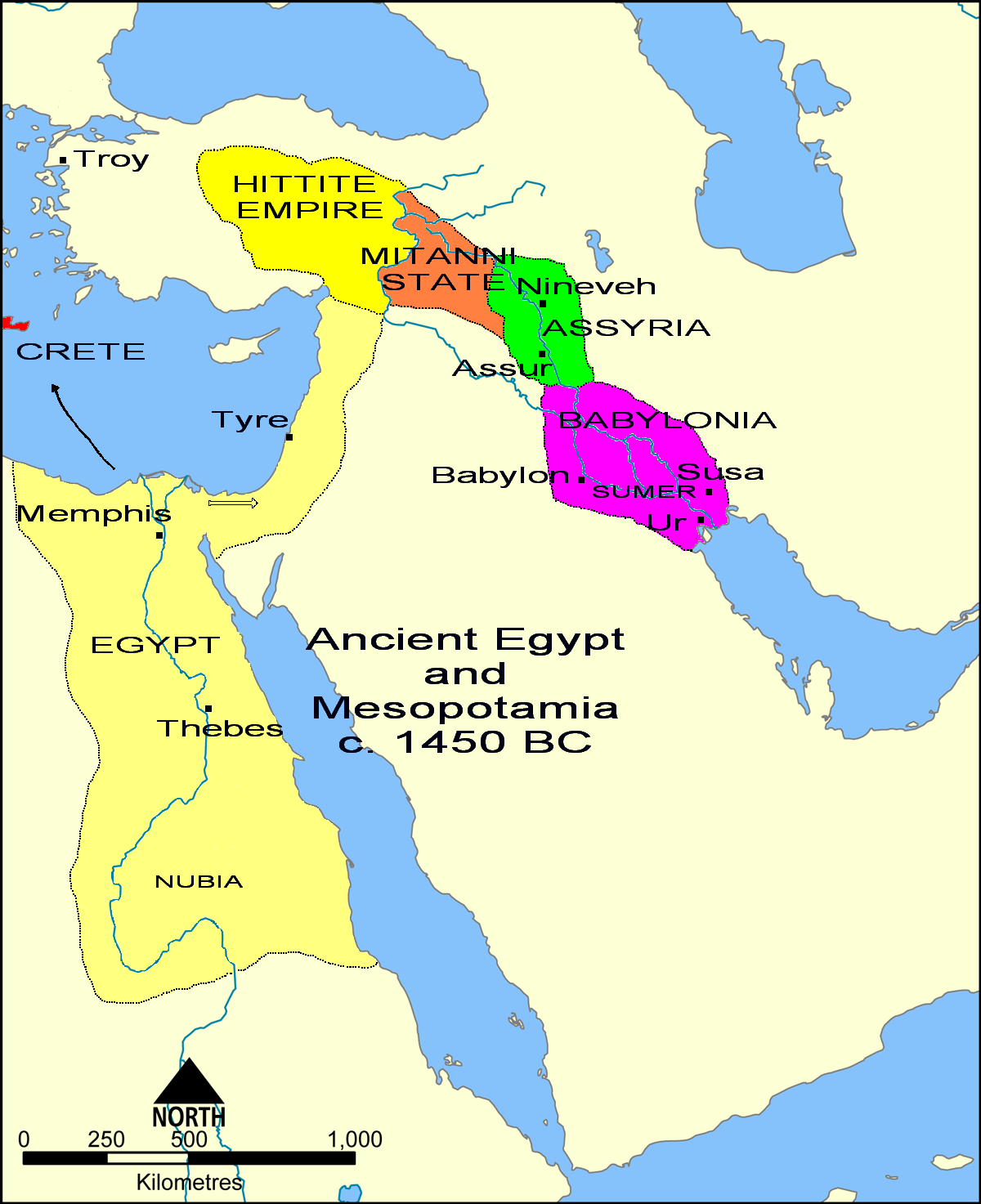
Map of Mesopotamia c. 1450 BC

Burnaburiash I succeeded him and drew up a peace treaty with the Assyrian king Puzur-Ashur III, and had a largely uneventful reign, as did his successor Kashtiliash III.

The Sealand Dynasty of southern Mesopotamia remained independent of Babylonia and like Assyria was in native Akkadian-speaking hands. Ulamburiash managed to attack it and conquered parts of the land from Ea-gamil, a king with a distinctly Sumerian name, around 1450 BC, whereupon Ea-Gamil fled to his allies in Elam. The Sealand Dynasty region still remained independent, and the Kassite king seems to have been unable to finally conquer it. Ulamburiash began making treaties with ancient Egypt, which then was ruling southern Canaan, and Assyria to the north. Agum III also campaigned against the Sealand Dynasty, finally wholly conquering the far south of Mesopotamia for Babylon, destroying its capital Dur-Enlil in the process. From there Agum III extended farther south still, invading what was many centuries later to be called the Arabian Peninsula or Arabia, and conquering the pre-Arab state of Dilmun (in modern Bahrain).

Karaindash built a bas-relief temple in Uruk and Kurigalzu I (1415–1390 BC) built a new capital Dur-Kurigalzu named after himself, transferring administrative rule from Babylon. Both of these kings continued to struggle unsuccessfully against the Sealand Dynasty. Karaindash also strengthened diplomatic ties with the Assyrian king Ashur-bel-nisheshu and the Egyptian Pharaoh Thutmose III and protected Babylonian borders with Elam.

Kadashman-Harbe I succeeded Karaindash, and briefly invaded Elam before being eventually defeated and ejected by its king Tepti Ahar. He then had to contend with the Suteans, ancient Semitic-speaking peoples from the southeastern Levant who invaded Babylonia and sacked Uruk. He describes having "annihilated their extensive forces", then constructed fortresses in a mountain region called Ḫiḫi, in the desert to the west (modern Syria) as security outposts, and "he dug wells and settled people on fertile lands, to strengthen the guard".

Kurigalzu I succeeded the throne, and soon came into conflict with Elam, to the east. When Ḫur-batila, the successor of Tepti Ahar took the throne of Elam, he began raiding Babylonia, taunting Kurigalzu to do battle with him at Dūr-Šulgi. Kurigalzu launched a campaign which resulted in the abject defeat and capture of Ḫur-batila, who appears in no other inscriptions. He went on to conquer the eastern lands of Elam. This took his army to the Elamite capital, the city of Susa, which was sacked. After this a puppet ruler was placed on the Elamite throne, subject to Babylonia. Kurigalzu I maintained friendly relations with Assyria, Egypt and the Hittites throughout his reign. Kadashman-Enlil I (1374–1360 BC) succeeded him, and continued his diplomatic policies.

Burna-Buriash II ascended to the throne in 1359 BC, he retained friendly relations with Egypt, but the resurgent Middle Assyrian Empire (1365–1050 BC) to the north was now encroaching into northern Babylonia, and as a symbol of peace, the Babylonian king took the daughter of the powerful Assyrian king Ashur-uballit I in marriage. He also maintained friendly relations with Suppiluliuma I, ruler of the Hittite Empire.

He was succeeded by Kara-ḫardaš (who was half Assyrian, and the grandson of the Assyrian king) in 1333 BC, a usurper named Nazi-Bugaš deposed him, enraging Ashur-uballit I, who invaded and sacked Babylon, slew Nazi-Bugaš, annexed Babylonian territory for the Middle Assyrian Empire, and installed Kurigalzu II (1345–1324 BC) as his vassal ruler of Babylonia.

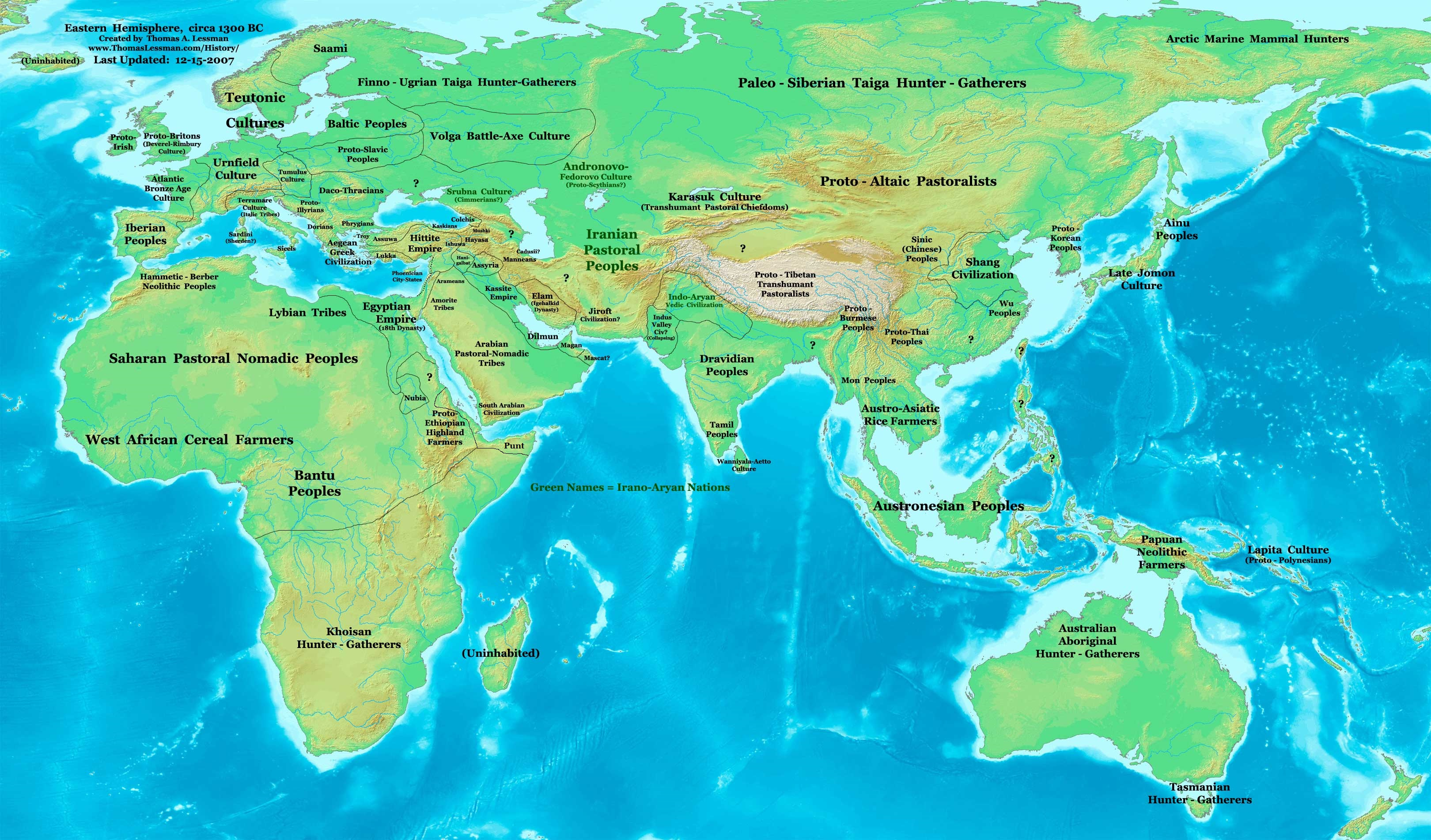
Map of Eurasia around 1300 BC showing the Babylonian Empire under the Kassite dynasty.

Soon after Arik-den-ili succeeded the throne of Assyria in 1327 BC, Kurigalzu II attacked Assyria in an attempt to reassert Babylonian power. After some impressive initial successes he was ultimately defeated, and lost yet more territory to Assyria. Between 1307 BC and 1232 BC his successors, such as Nazi-Maruttash, Kadashman-Turgu, Kadashman-Enlil II, Kudur-Enlil and Shagarakti-Shuriash, allied with the empires of the Hittites and the Mitanni (who were both also losing swathes of territory to the resurgent Assyrians), in a failed attempt to stop Assyrian expansion. This expansion, nevertheless, continued unchecked.

Kashtiliash IV's (1242–1235 BC) reign ended catastrophically as the Assyrian king Tukulti-Ninurta I (1243–1207 BC) routed his armies, sacked and burned Babylon and set himself up as king, ironically becoming the first native Mesopotamian to rule the Mesopotamian populated state, its previous rulers having all been non-Mesopotamian Amorites and Kassites. Kashtiliash himself was taken to Ashur as a prisoner of war.

An Assyrian governor/king named Enlil-nadin-shumi was placed on the throne to rule as viceroy to Tukulti-Ninurta I, and Kadashman-Harbe II and Adad-shuma-iddina succeeded as Assyrian governor/kings, also subject to Tukulti-Ninurta I until 1216 BC.

Babylon did not begin to recover until late in the reign of Adad-shuma-usur (1216–1189 BC), as he too remained a vassal of Assyria until 1193 BC. However, he was able to prevent the Assyrian king Enlil-kudurri-usur from retaking Babylonia, which, apart from its northern reaches, had mostly shrugged off Assyrian domination during a short period of civil war in the Assyrian empire, in the years after the death of Tukulti-Ninurta.

Meli-Shipak II (1188–1172 BC) seems to have had a peaceful reign. Despite not being able to regain northern Babylonia from Assyria, no further territory was lost, Elam did not threaten, and the Late Bronze Age collapse now affecting the Levant, Canaan, Egypt, the Caucasus, Anatolia, Mediterranean, North Africa, northern Iran and Balkans seemed (initially) to have little impact on Babylonia (or indeed Assyria and Elam).

War resumed under subsequent kings such as Marduk-apla-iddina I (1171–1159 BC) and Zababa-shuma-iddin (1158 BC). The long reigning Assyrian king Ashur-dan I (1179–1133 BC) resumed expansionist policies and conquered further parts of northern Babylonia from both kings, and the Elamite ruler Shutruk-Nakhunte eventually conquered most of eastern Babylonia. Enlil-nadin-ahhe (1157–1155 BC) was finally overthrown and the Kassite dynasty ended after Ashur-dan I conquered yet more of northern and central Babylonia, and the equally powerful Shutruk-Nahhunte pushed deep into the heart of Babylonia itself, sacking the city and slaying the king. Poetical works have been found lamenting this disaster.

Despite the loss of territory, general military weakness, and evident reduction in literacy and culture, the Kassite dynasty was the longest-lived dynasty of Babylon, lasting until 1155 BC, when Babylon was conquered by Shutruk-Nakhunte of Elam, and reconquered a few years later by the Nebuchadnezzar I, part of the larger Late Bronze Age collapse.

=== Early Iron Age – Native rule, second dynasty of Isin, 1155–1026 BC ===
The Elamites did not remain in control of Babylonia long, instead entering into an ultimately unsuccessful war with Assyria, allowing Marduk-kabit-ahheshu (1155–1139 BC) to establish the Dynasty IV of Babylon, from Isin, with the first native Akkadian-speaking south Mesopotamian dynasty to rule Babylonia, with Marduk-kabit-ahheshu becoming only the second native Mesopotamian to sit on the throne of Babylon, after the Assyrian king Tukulti-Ninurta I. His dynasty was to remain in power for some 125 years. The new king successfully drove out the Elamites and prevented any possible Kassite revival. Later in his reign he went to war with Assyria, and had some initial success, briefly capturing the south Assyrian city of Ekallatum before ultimately suffering defeat at the hands of Ashur-Dan I.

Itti-Marduk-balatu succeeded his father in 1138 BC, and successfully repelled Elamite attacks on Babylonia during his 8-year reign. He too made attempts to attack Assyria, but also met with failure at the hands of the still reigning Ashur-Dan I.

Ninurta-nadin-shumi took the throne in 1127 BC, and also attempted an invasion of Assyria, his armies seem to have skirted through eastern Aramea (modern Syria) and then made an attempt to attack the Assyrian city of Arbela (modern Erbil) from the west. However, this bold move met with defeat at the hands of Ashur-resh-ishi I who then forced a treaty in his favour upon the Babylonian king.

Nebuchadnezzar I (1124–1103 BC) was the most famous ruler of this dynasty. He fought and defeated the Elamites and drove them from Babylonian territory, invading Elam itself, sacking the Elamite capital Susa, and recovering the sacred statue of Marduk that had been carried off from Babylon during the fall of the Kassites. Shortly afterwards, the king of Elam was assassinated and his kingdom disintegrated into civil war. However, Nebuchadnezzar failed to extend Babylonian territory further, being defeated a number of times by Ashur-resh-ishi I (1133–1115 BC), king of the Middle Assyrian Empire, for control of formerly Hittite-controlled territories in Aram and Anatolia. The Hittite Empire of the northern and western Levant and eastern Anatolia had been largely annexed by the Middle Assyrian Empire, and its heartland finally overrun by invading Phrygians from the Balkans. In the later years of his reign, Nebuchadnezzar I devoted himself to peaceful building projects and securing Babylonia's borders against the Assyrians, Elamites and Arameans.

Nebuchadnezzar was succeeded by his two sons, firstly Enlil-nadin-apli (1103–1100 BC), who lost territory to Assyria. The second of them, Marduk-nadin-ahhe (1098–1081 BC) also went to war with Assyria. Some initial success in these conflicts gave way to a catastrophic defeat at the hands of the powerful Assyrian king Tiglath-Pileser I (1115–1076 BC), who annexed huge swathes of Babylonian territory, thus further expanding the Assyrian Empire. Following this a terrible famine gripped Babylon, inviting attacks and migrations from the northwest Semitic tribes of Aramaeans and Suteans from the Levant.

In 1072 BC Marduk-shapik-zeri signed a peace treaty with Ashur-bel-kala (1075–1056 BC) of Assyria, however, his successor Kadašman-Buriaš was not so friendly to Assyria, prompting the Assyrian king to invade Babylonia and depose him, placing Adad-apla-iddina on the throne as his vassal. Assyrian domination continued until c. 1050 BC, with Marduk-ahhe-eriba and Marduk-zer-X regarded as vassals of Assyria. After 1050 BC the Middle Assyrian Empire descended into a period of civil war, followed by constant warfare with the Arameans, Phrygians, Neo-Hittite states and Hurrians, allowing Babylonia to once more largely free itself from the Assyrian yoke for a few decades.

However, East Semitic-speaking Babylonia soon began to suffer further repeated incursions from West Semitic nomadic peoples migrating from the Levant during the Bronze Age collapse, and during the 11th century BC large swathes of the Babylonian countryside was appropriated and occupied by these newly arrived Arameans and Suteans. Arameans settled much of the countryside in eastern and central Babylonia and the Suteans in the western deserts, with the weak Babylonian kings being unable to stem these migrations.

=== Period of chaos, 1026–911 BC ===
The ruling Babylonian dynasty of Nabu-shum-libur was deposed by marauding Arameans in 1026 BC, and the heart of Babylonia, including the capital city itself descended into anarchic state, and no king was to rule Babylon for over 20 years.

However, in southern Mesopotamia (a region corresponding with the old Dynasty of the Sealand), Dynasty V (1025–1004 BC) arose, this was ruled by Simbar-shipak, leader of a Kassite clan, and was in effect a separate state from Babylon. The state of anarchy allowed the Assyrian ruler Ashur-nirari IV (1019–1013 BC) the opportunity to attack Babylonia in 1018 BC, and he invaded and captured the Babylonian city of Atlila and some south central regions of Mesopotamia for Assyria.

The south Mesopotamian dynasty was replaced by another Kassite Dynasty (Dynasty VI; 1003–984 BC) which also seems to have regained control over Babylon itself. The Elamites deposed this brief Kassite revival, with king Mar-biti-apla-usur founding Dynasty VII (984–977 BC). However, this dynasty too fell, when the Arameans once more ravaged Babylon.

Babylonian rule was restored by Nabû-mukin-apli in 977 BC, ushering in Dynasty VIII. Dynasty IX begins with Ninurta-kudurri-usur II, who ruled from 941 BC. Babylonia remained weak during this period, with whole areas of Babylonia now under firm Aramean and Sutean control. Babylonian rulers were often forced to bow to pressure from Assyria and Elam, both of which had appropriated Babylonian territory.

=== Assyrian rule, 911–619 BC ===
Babylonia remained in a state of chaos as the 10th century BC drew to a close. A further migration of nomads from the Levant occurred in the early 9th century BC with the arrival of the Chaldeans, another nomadic Northwest Semitic-speaking people described in Assyrian annals as the "Kaldu". The Chaldeans settled in the far southeast of Babylonia, joining the already long extant Arameans and Suteans. By 850 BC the migrant Chaldeans had established a small territory in the extreme southeast of Mesopotamia.

From 911 BC with the founding of the Neo-Assyrian Empire (911–605 BC) by Adad-nirari II, Babylon found itself once again under the domination and rule of its fellow Mesopotamian state for the next three centuries. Adad-nirari II twice attacked and defeated Shamash-mudammiq of Babylonia, annexing a large area of land north of the Diyala River and the towns of Hīt and Zanqu in mid Mesopotamia. He made further gains over Babylonia under Nabu-shuma-ukin I later in his reign. Tukulti-Ninurta II and Ashurnasirpal II also forced Babylonia into vassalage, and Shalmaneser III (859–824 BC) sacked Babylon itself, slew king Nabu-apla-iddina, subjugated the Aramean, Sutean and Chaldean tribes settled within Babylonia, and installed Marduk-zakir-shumi I (855–819 BC) followed by Marduk-balassu-iqbi (819–813 BC) as his vassals. It was during the late 850s BC, in the annals of Shalmaneser III, that the Chaldeans and Arabs dwelling in some northern regions of the Arabian Peninsula are first mentioned in the pages of written recorded history.

Upon the death of Shalmaneser II, Baba-aha-iddina was reduced to vassalage by the Assyrian queen Shammuramat (known as Semiramis to the Persians, Armenians and Greeks), acting as regent to his successor Adad-nirari III who was merely a boy. Adad-nirari III eventually killed Baba-aha-iddina and ruled there directly until 800 BC until Ninurta-apla-X was crowned. However, he too was subjugated by Adad-Nirari III. The next Assyrian king, Shamshi-Adad V then made a vassal of Marduk-bel-zeri.

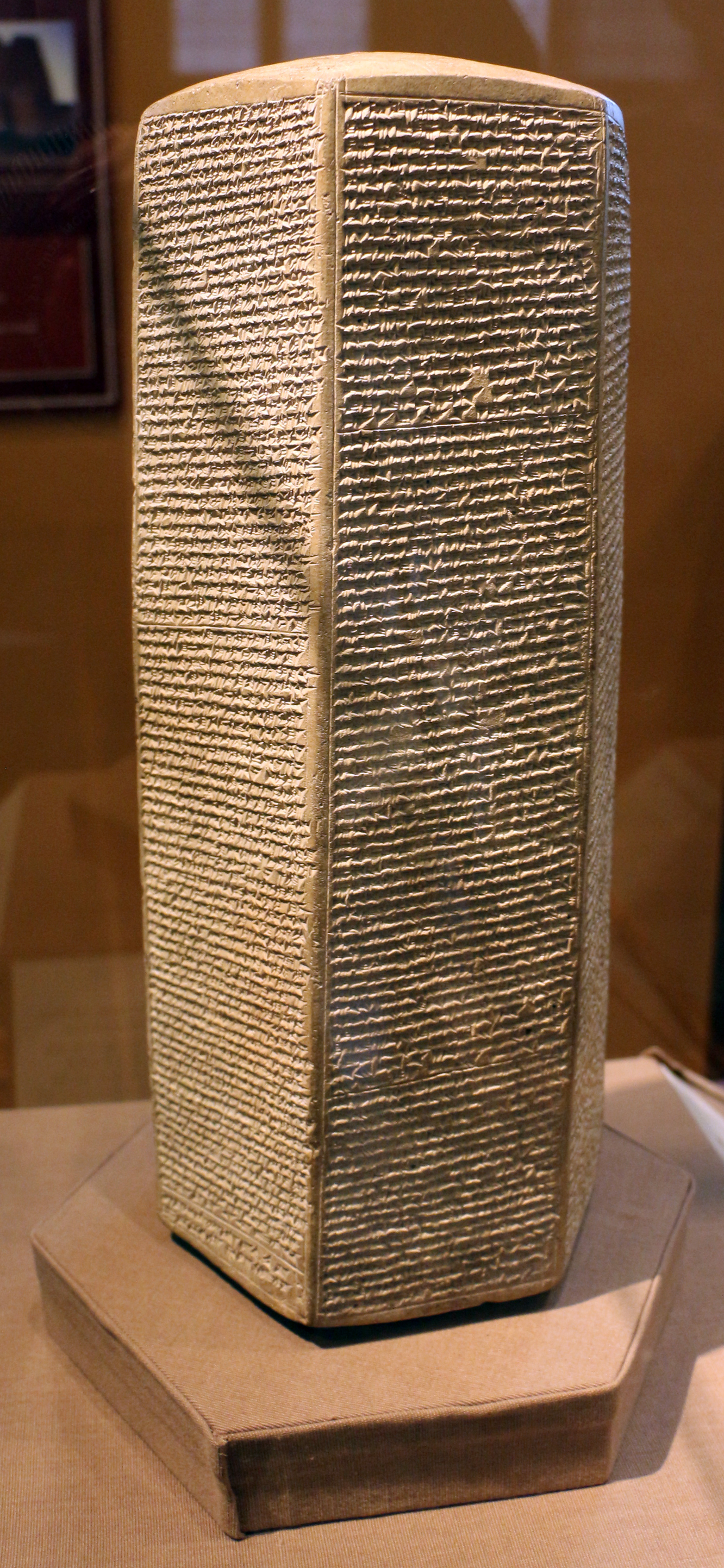
Prism of Sennacherib (705–681 BC), containing records of his military campaigns, culminating with Babylon's destruction. Exhibited at the Oriental Institute of the University of Chicago.

Babylonia briefly fell to another foreign ruler when Marduk-apla-usur ascended the throne in 780 BC, taking advantage of a period of civil war in Assyria. He was a member of the Chaldean tribe who had a century or so earlier settled in a small region in the far southeastern corner of Mesopotamia, bordering the Persian Gulf and southwestern Elam. Shalmaneser IV attacked him and retook northern Babylonia, forcing a border treaty in Assyria's favour upon him. However, he was allowed to remain on the throne, and successfully stabilised the part of Babylonia he controlled. Eriba-Marduk, another Chaldean, succeeded him in 769 BC and his son, Nabu-shuma-ishkun in 761 BC. Babylonia appears to have been in a state of chaos during this time, with the north occupied by Assyria, its throne occupied by foreign Chaldeans, and civil unrest prominent throughout the land.

The Babylonian king Nabonassar overthrew the Chaldean usurpers in 748 BC, and successfully stabilised Babylonia, remaining untroubled by Ashur-nirari V of Assyria. However, with the accession of Tiglath-Pileser III (745–727 BC) Babylonia came under renewed attack. Babylon was invaded and sacked and Nabonassar reduced to vassalage. His successors Nabu-nadin-zeri, Nabu-suma-ukin II and Nabu-mukin-zeri were also in servitude to Tiglath-Pileser III, until in 729 BC the Assyrian king decided to rule Babylon directly as its king instead of allowing Babylonian kings to remain as vassals of Assyria as his predecessors had done for two hundred years.

It was during this period that Eastern Aramaic was introduced by the Assyrians as the lingua franca of the Neo-Assyrian Empire, and the still spoken (by Assyrians and Mandeans) Mesopotamian Aramaic began to slowly overlay and supplant Akkadian as the spoken language of the general populace of both Assyria and Babylonia.

The Assyrian king Shalmaneser V was declared king of Babylon in 727 BC, but died whilst besieging Samaria in 722 BC.

Marduk-apla-iddina II, a Chaldean malka (chieftain) of the far southeast of Mesopotamia, then fomented revolt against Assyrian domination, assisted by strong Elamite support. Marduk-apla-iddina managed to take the throne of Babylon itself between 721 and 710 BC whilst the Assyrian king Sargon II (722–705 BC) were otherwise occupied in defeating the Scythians and Cimmerians who had attacked Assyria's Persian and Median vassal colonies in ancient Iran. Marduk-apla-iddina II was eventually defeated and ejected by Sargon II of Assyria, and fled to his protectors in Elam. Sargon II was then declared king in Babylon.

==== Destruction of Babylon ====
Sennacherib (705–681 BC) succeeded Sargon II, and after ruling directly for a while, he placed his son Ashur-nadin-shumi on the throne. However, Merodach-Baladan and his Elamite protectors continued to unsuccessfully agitate against Assyrian rule. Nergal-ushezib, an Elamite, murdered the Assyrian prince and briefly took the throne. This led the infuriated Assyrian king Sennacherib to invade and subjugate Elam and to sack Babylon, laying waste to the region and largely destroying the city. While praying to the god Nisroch in Nineveh in 681 BC, Sennacherib was soon murdered by his own sons. The new Assyrian king Esarhaddon placed a puppet king Marduk-zakir-shumi II on the throne in Babylon. However, Marduk-apla-iddina returned from exile in Elam, and briefly deposed Marduk-zakir-shumi, whereupon Esarhaddon was forced to attack and defeat him. Marduk-apla-iddina once more fled to his masters in Elam, where he died in exile.

==== Restoration and rebuilding ====
Esarhaddon (681–669 BC) ruled Babylon personally, he completely rebuilt the city, bringing rejuvenation and peace to the region. Upon his death, and in an effort to maintain harmony within his vast empire (which stretched from the Caucasus to Egypt and Nubia and from Cyprus to Persia and the Caspian Sea), he installed his eldest son Shamash-shum-ukin as a subject king in Babylon, and his youngest, the highly educated Ashurbanipal (669–627 BC), in the more senior position as king of Assyria and overlord of Shamash-shum-ukin.

==== Babylonian revolt ====
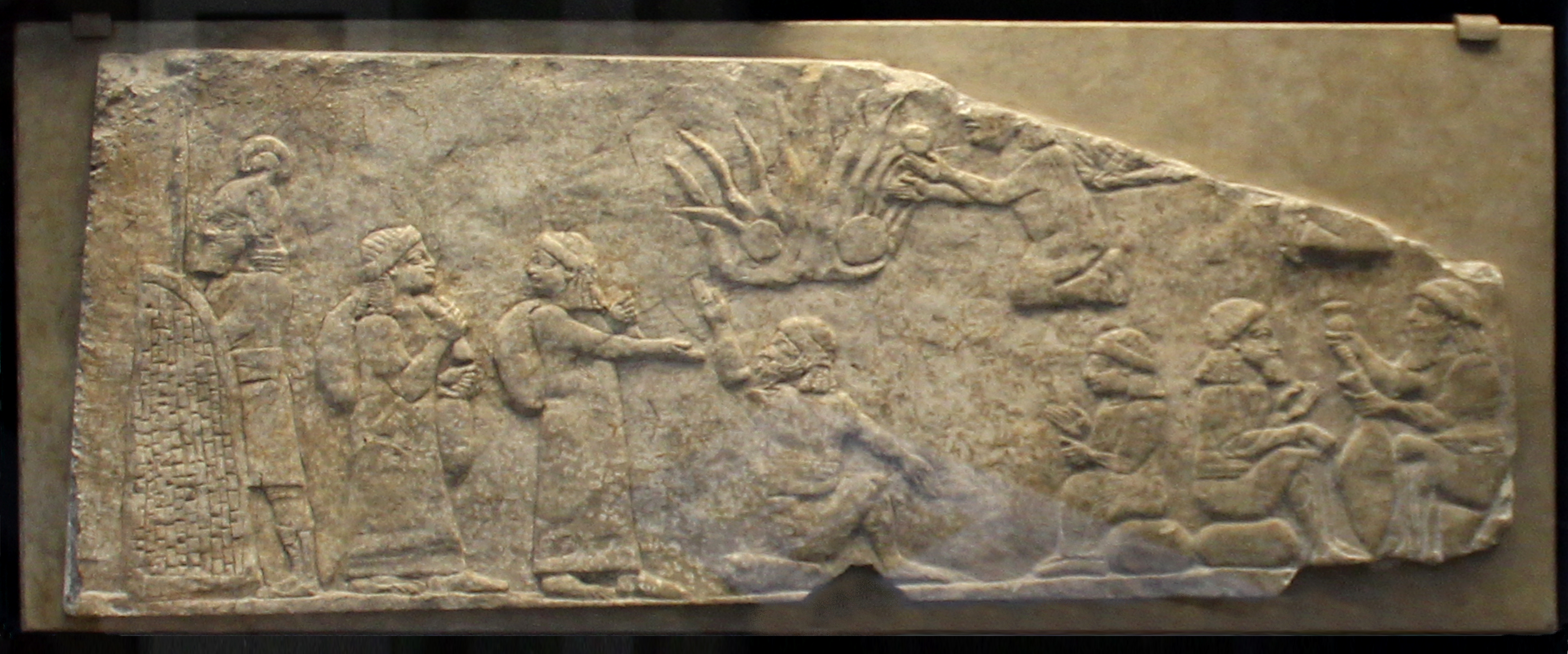
Babylonian prisoners under the surveillance of an Assyrian guard, reign of Ashurbanipal 668–630 BC, Nineveh, British Museum ME 124788

Despite being an Assyrian himself, Shamash-shum-ukin, after decades subject to his brother Ashurbanipal, declared that the city of Babylon (and not the Assyrian city of Nineveh) should be the seat of the immense empire. He raised a major revolt against his brother, Ashurbanipal. He led a powerful coalition of peoples also resentful of Assyrian subjugation and rule, including Elam, the Persians, Medes, the Babylonians, Chaldeans and Suteans of southern Mesopotamia, the Arameans of the Levant and southwest Mesopotamia, the Arabs and Dilmunites of the Arabian Peninsula and the Canaanites-Phoenicians. After a bitter struggle Babylon was sacked and its allies vanquished, Shamash-shum-ukim being killed in the process. Elam was destroyed once and for all, and the Babylonians, Persians, Chaldeans, Arabs, Medes, Elamites, Arameans, Suteans and Canaanites were violently subjugated, with Assyrian troops exacting savage revenge on the rebelling peoples. An Assyrian governor named Kandalanu was placed on the throne to rule on behalf of the Assyrian king. Upon Ashurbanipal's death in 627 BC, his son Ashur-etil-ilani (627–623 BC) became ruler of Babylon and Assyria.

However, Assyria soon descended into a series of brutal internal civil wars which were to cause its downfall. Ashur-etil-ilani was deposed by one of his own generals, named Sin-shumu-lishir in 623 BC, who also set himself up as king in Babylon. After only one year on the throne amidst continual civil war, Sinsharishkun (622–612 BC) ousted him as ruler of Assyria and Babylonia in 622 BC. However, he too was beset by constant unremitting civil war in the Assyrian heartland. Babylonia took advantage of this and rebelled under Nabopolassar, a previously unknown malka (chieftain) of the Chaldeans, who had settled in southeastern Mesopotamia by c. 850 BC.

It was during the reign of Sin-shar-ishkun that Assyria's vast empire began to unravel, and many of its former subject peoples ceased to pay tribute, most significantly for the Assyrians; the Babylonians, Chaldeans, Medes, Persians, Scythians, Arameans and Cimmerians.

=== Neo-Babylonian Empire (Chaldean Empire) ===
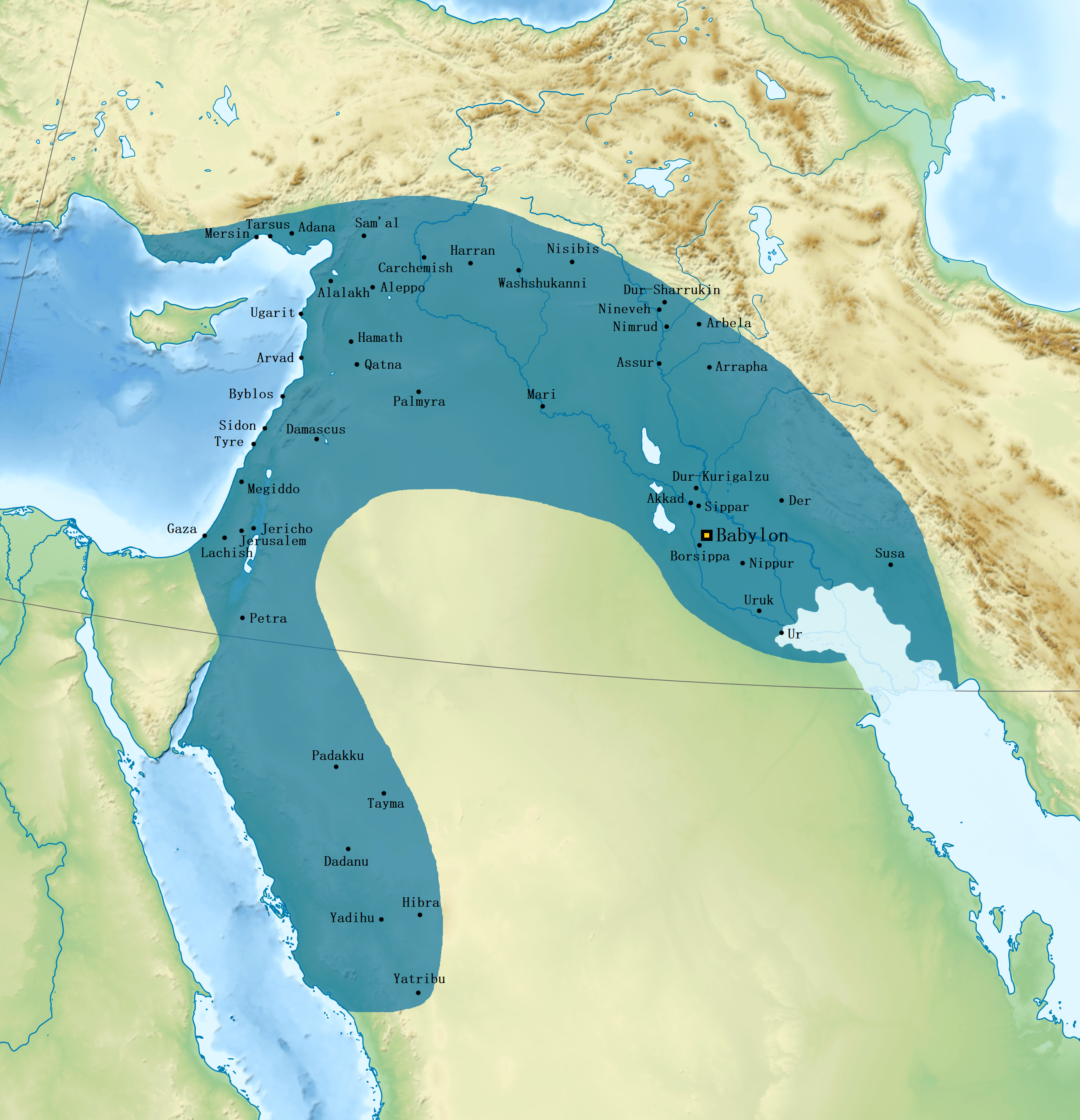
The Neo-Babylonian Empire.

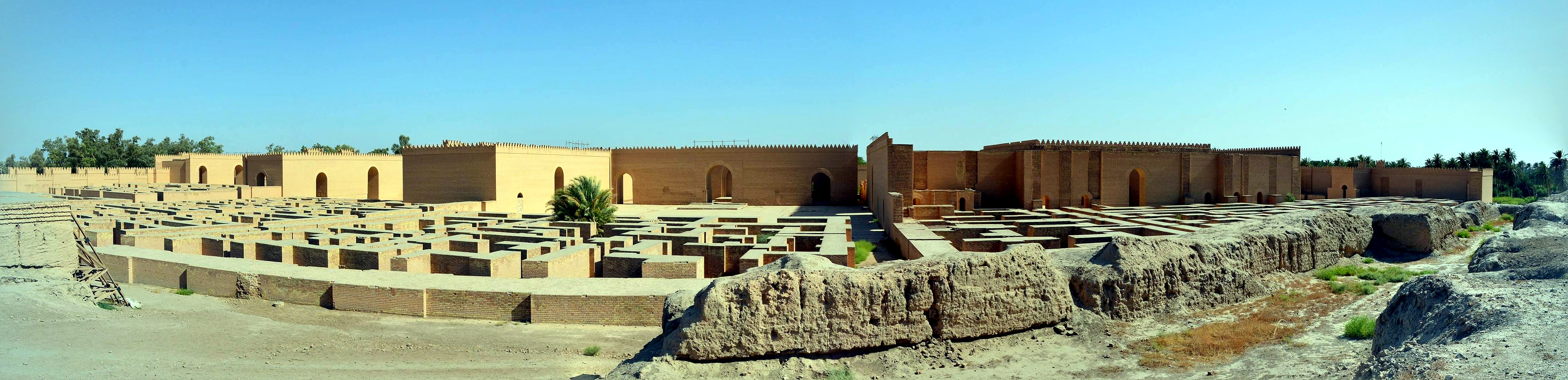
Panorama view of the reconstructed Southern Palace of Nebuchadnezzar II, 6th century BC, Babylon, Iraq.

In 620 BC Nabopolassar seized control over much of Babylonia with the support of most of the inhabitants, with only the city of Nippur and some northern regions showing any loyalty to the beleaguered Assyrian king. Nabopolassar was unable to utterly secure Babylonia, and for the next four years he was forced to contend with an occupying Assyrian army encamped in Babylonia trying to unseat him. However, the Assyrian king, Sin-shar-ishkun was plagued by constant revolts among his people in Nineveh, and was thus prevented from ejecting Nabopolassar.

The stalemate ended in 615 BC, when Nabopolassar entered the Babylonians and Chaldeans into alliance with Cyaxares, an erstwhile vassal of Assyria, and king of the Iranian peoples; the Medes, Persians, Sagartians and Parthians. Cyaxares had also taken advantage of the Assyrian destruction of the formerly regionally dominant pre-Iranian Elamite and Mannean nations and the subsequent anarchy in Assyria to free the Iranic peoples from three centuries of the Assyrian yoke and regional Elamite domination. The Scythians from north of the Caucasus, and the Cimmerians from the Black Sea who had both also been subjugated by Assyria, joined the alliance, as did regional Aramean tribes.

In 615 BC, while the Assyrian king was fully occupied fighting rebels in both Babylonia and Assyria itself, Cyaxares launched a surprise attack on the Assyrian heartlands, sacking the cities of Kalhu (the Biblical Calah, Nimrud) and Arrapḫa (modern Kirkuk), Nabopolassar was still pinned down in southern Mesopotamia and thus not involved in this breakthrough.

From this point on the coalition of Babylonians, Chaldeans, Medes, Persians, Scythians, Cimmerians and Sagartians fought in unison against a civil war ravaged Assyria. Major Assyrian cities such as Ashur, Arbela (modern Irbil), Guzana, Dur Sharrukin (modern Khorsabad), Imgur-Enlil, Nibarti-Ashur, Gasur, Kanesh, Kar Ashurnasipal and Tushhan fell to the alliance during 614 BC. Sin-shar-ishkun somehow managed to rally against the odds during 613 BC, and drove back the combined forces ranged against him.

The alliance launched a renewed combined attack the following year, and after five years of fierce fighting Nineveh was sacked in late 612 BC after a prolonged siege, in which Sin-shar-ishkun was killed defending his capital.

House to house fighting continued in Nineveh, and an Assyrian general and member of the royal household, took the throne as Ashur-uballit II (612–605 BC). He was offered the chance of accepting a position of vassalage by the leaders of the alliance according to the Babylonian Chronicle. He refused and managed to successfully fight his way out of Nineveh and to the northern Assyrian city of Harran in Upper Mesopotamia where he founded a new capital. The fighting continued, as the Assyrian king held out against the alliance until 607 BC, when he was eventually ejected by the Medes, Babylonians, Scythians and their allies, and prevented in an attempt to regain the city the same year.

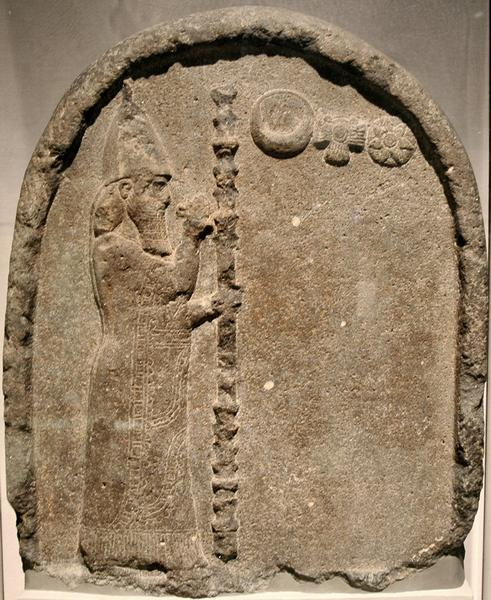
Stele of Nabonidus exhibited in the British Museum. The king is shown praying to the Moon, the Sun and Venus and is depicted as being the closest to the Moon.

The Egyptian Pharaoh Necho II, whose dynasty had been installed as vassals of Assyria in 671 BC, belatedly tried to aid Egypt's former Assyrian masters, possibly out of fear that Egypt would be next to succumb to the new powers without Assyria to protect them, having already been ravaged by the Scythians. The Assyrians fought on with Egyptian aid until what was probably a final decisive victory was achieved against them at Carchemish in northwestern Assyria in 605 BC. The seat of empire was thus transferred to Babylonia for the first time since Hammurabi over a thousand years before.

Nabopolassar was followed by his son Nebuchadnezzar II (605–562 BC), whose reign of 43 years made Babylon once more the ruler of much of the civilized world, taking over portions of the former Assyrian Empire, with the eastern and northeastern portion being taken by the Medes and the far north by the Scythians.

Nebuchadnezzar II may have also had to contend with remnants of the Assyrian resistance. Some sections of the Assyrian army and administration may have still continued in and around Dur-Katlimmu in northwest Assyria for a time, however, by 599 BC Assyrian imperial records from this region also fell silent. The fate of Ashur-uballit II remains unknown, and he may have been killed attempting to regain Harran, at Carchemish, or continued to fight on, eventually disappearing into obscurity.

The Scythians and Cimmerians, erstwhile allies of Babylonia under Nabopolassar, now became a threat, and Nebuchadnezzar II was forced to march into Anatolia and rout their forces, ending the northern threat to his Empire.

The Egyptians attempted to remain in the Near East, possibly in an effort to aid in restoring Assyria as a secure buffer against Babylonia and the Medes and Persians, or to carve out an empire of their own. Nebuchadnezzar II campaigned against the Egyptians and drove them back over the Sinai. However, an attempt to take Egypt itself as his Assyrian predecessors had succeeded in doing failed, mainly due to a series of rebellions from the Israelites of Judah and the former kingdom of Ephraim, the Phoenicians of Caanan and the Arameans of the Levant. The Babylonian king crushed these rebellions, deposed Jehoiakim, the king of Judah, and deported a sizeable part of the population to Babylonia. Cities like Tyre, Sidon and Damascus were also subjugated. The Arabs and other South Arabian peoples who dwelt in the deserts to the south of the borders of Mesopotamia were then also subjugated.

In 567 BC he went to war with Pharaoh Amasis, and briefly invaded Egypt itself. After securing his empire, which included marrying a Median princess, he devoted himself to maintaining the empire and conducting numerous impressive building projects in Babylon. He is credited with building the fabled Hanging Gardens of Babylon.

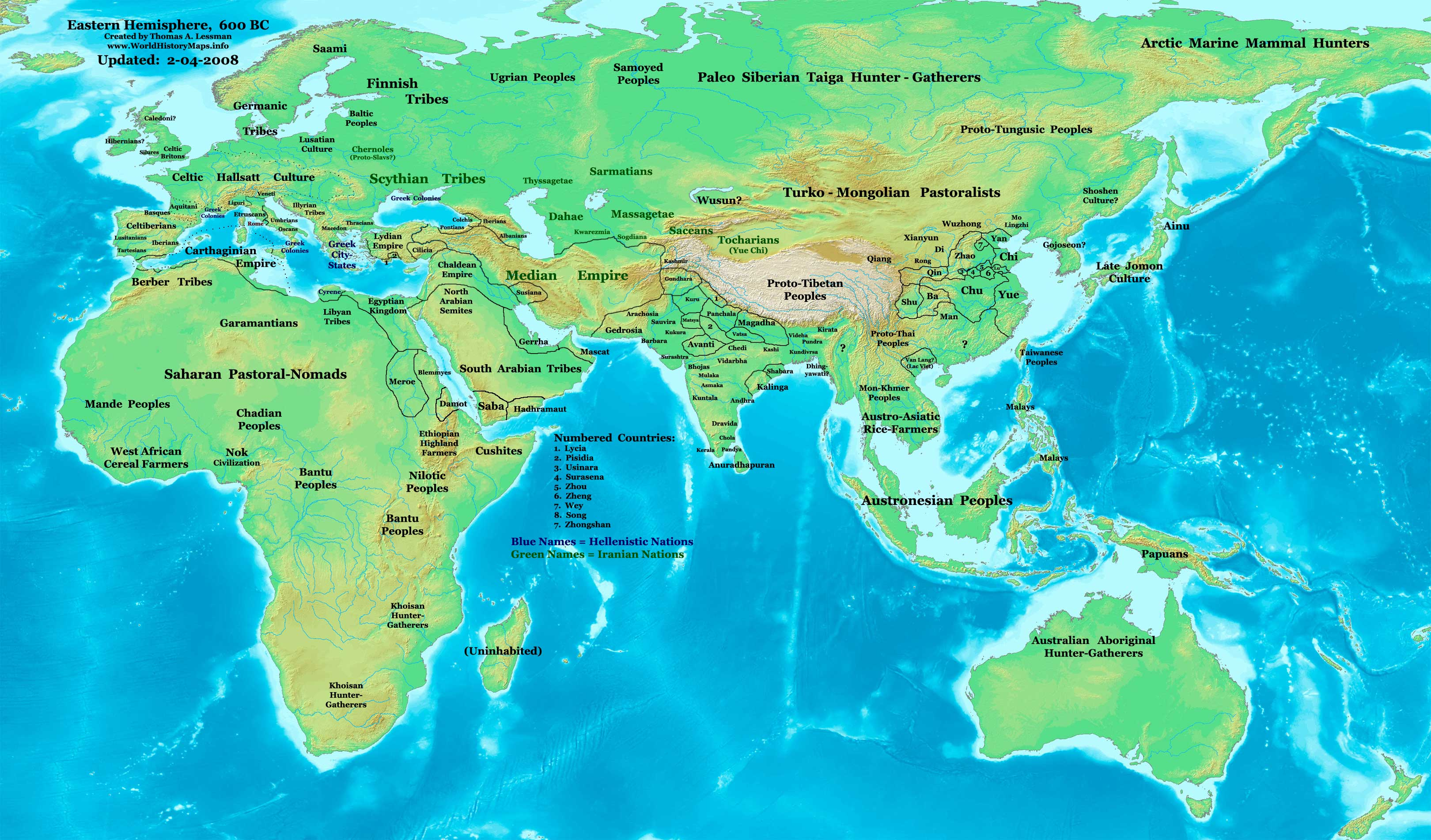
Eurasia around 600 BC, showing Neo-Babylonian Empire (Chaldean Empire) and its neighbors.

Amel-Marduk succeeded to the throne and reigned for only two years. Little contemporary record of his rule survives, though Berosus later stated that he was deposed and murdered in 560 BC by his successor Neriglissar for conducting himself in an "improper manner".

Neriglissar (560–556 BC) also had a short reign. He was the son in law of Nebuchadnezzar II, and it is unclear if he was a Chaldean or native Babylonian who married into the dynasty. He campaigned in Aram and Phoenicia, successfully maintaining Babylonian rule in these regions. Neriglissar died young however, and was succeeded by his son Labashi-Marduk (556 BC), who was still a boy. He was deposed and killed during the same year in a palace conspiracy.

Of the reign of the last Babylonian king, Nabonidus (Nabu-na'id, 556–539 BC) who is the son of the Assyrian priestess Adda-Guppi and who managed to kill the last Chaldean king, Labashi-Marduk, and took the reign, there is a fair amount of information available. Nabonidus (hence his son, the regent Belshazzar) was, at least from the mother's side, neither Chaldean nor Babylonian, but ironically Assyrian, hailing from its final capital of Harran (Kharranu). His father's origins remain unknown. Information regarding Nabonidus is chiefly derived from a chronological tablet containing the annals of Nabonidus, supplemented by another inscription of Nabonidus where he recounts his restoration of the temple of the Moon-god Sin at Harran; as well as by a proclamation of Cyrus issued shortly after his formal recognition as king of Babylonia.

A number of factors arose which would ultimately lead to the fall of Babylon. The population of Babylonia became restive and increasingly disaffected under Nabonidus. He excited a strong feeling against himself by attempting to centralize the polytheistic religion of Babylonia in the temple of Marduk at Babylon, and while he had thus alienated the local priesthoods, the military party also despised him on account of his antiquarian tastes. He seemed to have left the defense of his kingdom to his son Belshazzar (a capable soldier but poor diplomat who alienated the political elite), occupying himself with the more congenial work of excavating the foundation records of the temples and determining the dates of their builders. He also spent time outside Babylonia, rebuilding temples in the Assyrian city of Harran, and also among his Arab subjects in the deserts to the south of Mesopotamia. Nabonidus and Belshazzar's Assyrian heritage is also likely to have added to this resentment. In addition, Mesopotamian military might have usually been concentrated in the martial state of Assyria. Babylonia had always been more vulnerable to conquest and invasion than its northern neighbour, and without the might of Assyria to keep foreign powers in check and Mesopotamia dominant, Babylonia was exposed.

It was in the sixth year of Nabonidus (549 BC) that Cyrus the Great, the Achaemenid Persian "king of Anshan" in Elam, revolted against his suzerain Astyages, "king of the Manda" or Medes, at Ecbatana. Astyages' army betrayed him to his enemy, and Cyrus established himself at Ecbatana, thus putting an end to the empire of the Medes and making the Persian faction dominant among the Iranic peoples. Three years later Cyrus had become king of all Persia, and was engaged in a campaign to put down a revolt among the Assyrians. Meanwhile, Nabonidus had established a camp in the desert of his colony of Arabia, near the southern frontier of his kingdom, leaving his son Belshazzar (Belsharutsur) in command of the army.

In 539 BC Cyrus invaded Babylonia. A battle was fought at Opis in the month of June, where the Babylonians were defeated; and immediately afterwards Sippar surrendered to the invader. Nabonidus fled to Babylon, where he was pursued by Gobryas, and on the 16th day of Tammuz, two days after the capture of Sippar, "the soldiers of Cyrus entered Babylon without fighting". Nabonidus was dragged from his hiding place, where the services continued without interruption. Cyrus did not arrive until the 3rd of Marchesvan (October), Gobryas having acted for him in his absence. Gobryas was now made governor of the province of Babylon, and a few days afterwards Belshazzar the son of Nabonidus died in battle. A public mourning followed, lasting six days, and Cyrus' son Cambyses accompanied the corpse to the tomb.

One of the first acts of Cyrus accordingly was to allow the Jewish exiles to return to their own homes, carrying with them their sacred temple vessels. The permission to do so was embodied in a proclamation, whereby the conqueror endeavored to justify his claim to the Babylonian throne.

Cyrus now claimed to be the legitimate successor of the ancient Babylonian kings and the avenger of Bel-Marduk, who was assumed to be wrathful at the impiety of Nabonidus in removing the images of the local gods from their ancestral shrines to his capital Babylon.

The Chaldean tribe had lost control of Babylonia decades before the end of the era that sometimes bears their name, and they appear to have blended into the general populace of Babylonia even before this (for example, Nabopolassar, Nebuchadnezzar II and their successors always referred to themselves as Shar Akkad and never as Shar Kaldu on inscriptions), and during the Persian Achaemenid Empire the term Chaldean ceased to refer to a race of people, and instead specifically to a social class of priests educated in classical Babylonian literature, particularly Astronomy and Astrology. By the mid Seleucid Empire (312–150 BC) period this term too had fallen from use.

=== Fall of Babylon ===
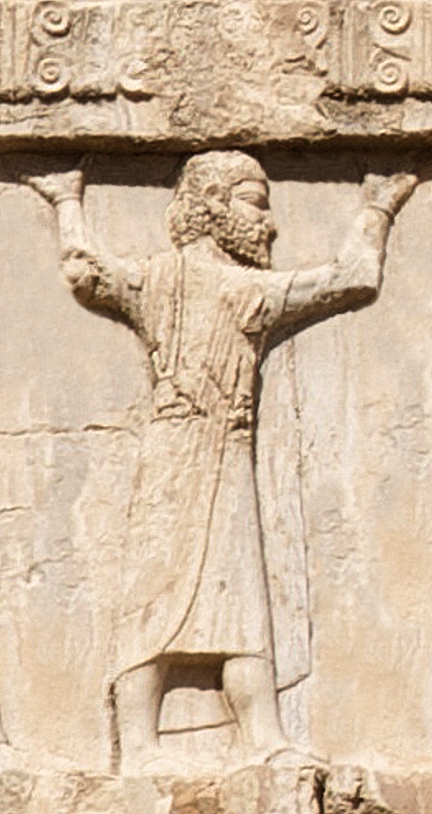
Babylonian soldier of the Achaemenid army, circa 480 BC. Relief of the tomb of Xerxes I.

Babylonia was absorbed into the Achaemenid Empire in 539 BC, becoming the satrapy of Babirush (Old Persian: 𐎲𐎠𐎲𐎡𐎽, romanized: Bābiruš).

A year before Cyrus' death, in 529 BC, he elevated his son Cambyses II in the government, making him king of Babylon. He reserved for himself the fuller title of "king of the (other) provinces" of the empire. It was only when Darius I acquired the Persian throne and ruled it as a representative of the Zoroastrian religion that the old tradition was broken and the claim of Babylon to confer legitimacy on the rulers of West Asia ceased to be acknowledged.

Immediately after Darius seized Persia, Babylonia briefly recovered its independence under a native ruler, Nidinta-Bel, who took the name of Nebuchadnezzar III, and reigned from October 522 BC to August 520 BC, when Darius took the city by storm. During this period Assyria to the north also rebelled. A few years later, probably 514 BC, Babylon again revolted under the Urartian king Nebuchadnezzar IV; on this occasion, after its capture by the Persians, the walls were partly destroyed. The Esagila, the great temple of Marduk, however, still continued to be kept in repair and to be a center of Babylonian religious feelings.

Alexander the Great conquered Babylon in 333 BC for the Macedonians, and died there in 323 BC. Babylonia and Assyria then became part of the Greek Seleucid Empire. It has long been maintained that the foundation of Seleucia diverted the population to the new capital of Lower Mesopotamia and that the ruins of the old city became a quarry for the builders of the new seat of government, but the recent publication of the Babylonian Chronicles has shown that urban life was still very much the same well into the Parthian Empire (150 BC to 226 AD). The Parthian king Mithridates conquered the region into the Parthian Empire in 150 BC, and the region became something of a battleground between Greeks and Parthians.

There was a brief interlude of Roman conquest (the provinces of Assyria and Mesopotamia; 116–118 AD) under Trajan, after which the Parthians reasserted control.

The satrapy of Babylonia was absorbed into Asōristān (Middle Persian for "the land of Assyria") in the Sasanian Empire, which began in 226 AD, and by this time East Syriac Rite Christianity, which emerged in Assyria and Upper Mesopotamia the first century, had become the dominant religion among the Assyrian people, who had never adopted the Zoroastrianism or Hellenistic religion or the languages of their rulers.

Apart from the small 2nd century BC to 3rd century AD independent Neo-Assyrian states of Adiabene, Osroene, Assur, Beth Garmai, Beth Nuhadra and Hatra in the north, Mesopotamia remained under largely Persian control until the Arab Muslim conquest of Persia in the seventh century AD. Asōristān was dissolved as a geopolitical entity in 637, and the native Eastern Aramaic-speaking and largely Christian populace of southern and central Mesopotamia (with the exception of the Mandeans) gradually underwent Arabization and Islamization, in contrast to northern Mesopotamia where an Assyrian continuity endures to the present day.

== Culture ==
Bronze Age to Early Iron Age Mesopotamian culture is sometimes summarized as "Assyro-Babylonian", because of the close ethnic, linguistic and cultural interdependence of the two political centers. The term "Babylonia", especially in writings from around the early 20th century, was formerly used to also include Southern Mesopotamia's earliest pre-Babylonian history, and not only in reference to the later city-state of Babylon proper. This geographic usage of the name "Babylonia" has generally been replaced by the more accurate term Sumer or Sumero-Akkadian in more recent writing, referring to the pre-Assyro-Babylonian Mesopotamian civilization.

=== Babylonian culture ===
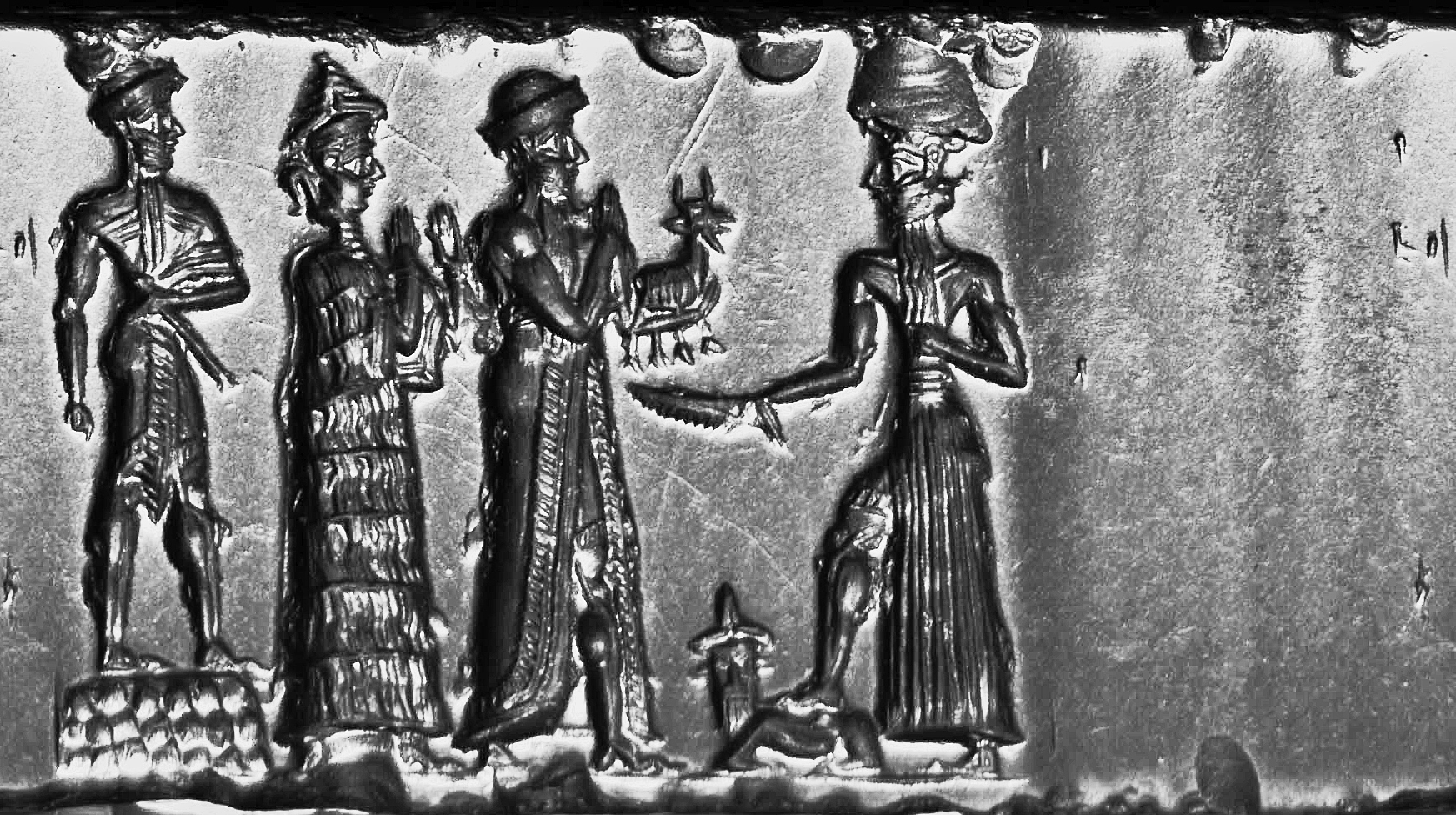
Old Babylonian Cylinder Seal, hematite. The king makes an animal offering to Shamash. This seal was probably made in a workshop at Sippar.

==== Art and architecture ====
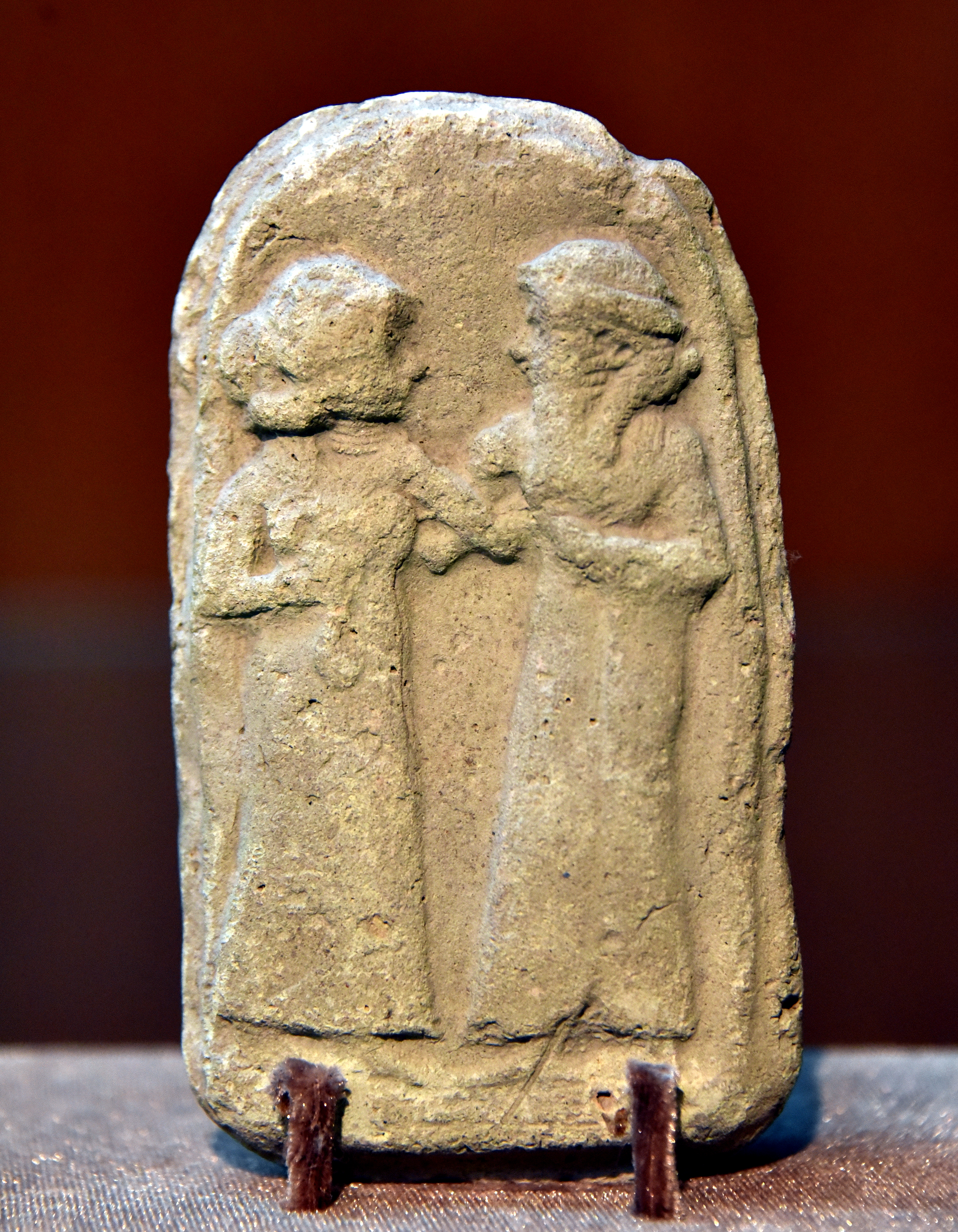
Man and woman, Old-Babylonian fired clay plaque from Southern Mesopotamia. Sulaymaniyah museum, Sulaymaniyah. Iraq

In Babylonia, an abundance of clay, and lack of stone, led to greater use of mudbrick; Babylonian, Sumerian and Assyrian temples were massive structures of crude brick which were supported by buttresses, the rain being carried off by drains. One such drain at Ur was made of lead. The use of brick led to the early development of the pilaster and column, and of frescoes and enameled tiles. The walls were brilliantly coloured, and sometimes plated with zinc or gold, as well as with tiles. Painted terracotta cones for torches were also embedded in the plaster. In Babylonia, in place of the relief, there was greater use of three-dimensional figures—the earliest examples being the Statues of Gudea, that are realistic if somewhat clumsy. The paucity of stone in Babylonia made every pebble precious, and led to a high perfection in the art of gem-cutting.

==== Astronomy ====
Tablets dating back to the Old Babylonian period document the application of mathematics to the variation in the length of daylight over a solar year. Centuries of Babylonian observations of celestial phenomena are recorded in the series of cuneiform script tablets known as the 'Enūma Anu Enlil'. The oldest significant astronomical text that we possess is Tablet 63 of 'Enūma Anu Enlil', the Venus tablet of Ammi-Saduqa, which lists the first and last visible risings of Venus over a period of about 21 years and is the earliest evidence that the phenomena of a planet were recognized as periodic. The oldest rectangular astrolabe dates back to Babylonia c. 1100 BC. The MUL.APIN, contains catalogues of stars and constellations as well as schemes for predicting heliacal risings and the settings of the planets, lengths of daylight measured by a water clock, gnomon, shadows, and intercalations. The Babylonian GU text arranges stars in 'strings' that lie along declination circles and thus measure right-ascensions or time-intervals, and also employs the stars of the zenith, which are also separated by given right-ascensional differences.

==== Medicine ====
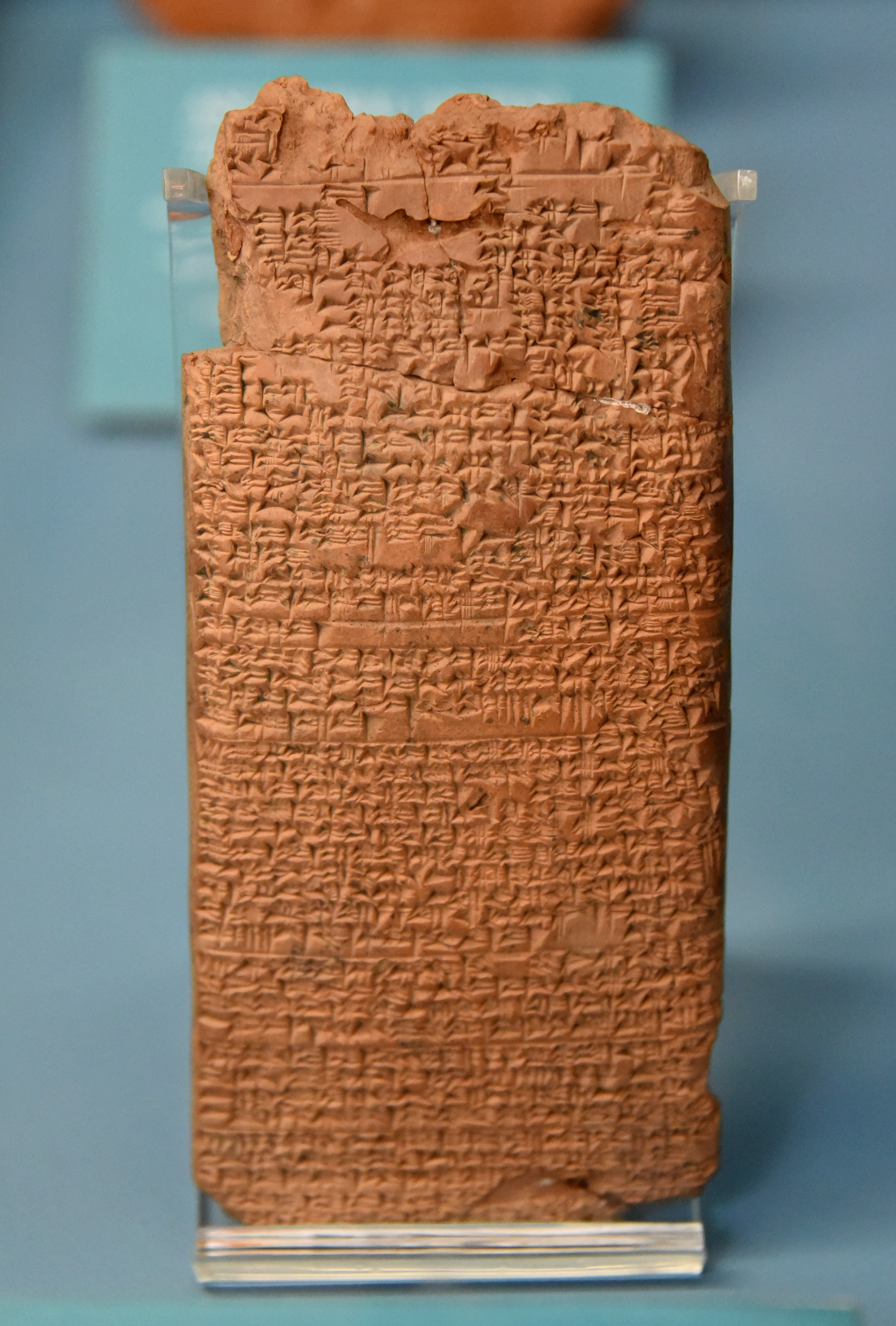
Medical recipe concerning poisoning. Terracotta tablet, from Nippur, Iraq, 18th century BC. Ancient Orient Museum, Istanbul

We find [medical semiotics] in a whole constellation of disciplines. ... There was a real common ground among these [Babylonian] forms of knowledge ... an approach involving analysis of particular cases, constructed only through traces, symptoms, hints. ... In short, we can speak about a symptomatic or divinatory [or conjectural] paradigm which could be oriented toward past present or future, depending on the form of knowledge called upon. Toward future ... that was the medical science of symptoms, with its double character, diagnostic, explaining past and present, and prognostic, suggesting likely future. ...

— Carlo Ginzburg

The oldest Babylonian (i.e., Akkadian) texts on medicine date back to the First Babylonian dynasty in the first half of the 2nd millennium BC although the earliest medical prescriptions appear in Sumerian during the Third Dynasty of Ur period. The most extensive Babylonian medical text, however, is the Diagnostic Handbook written by the ummânū, or chief scholar, Esagil-kin-apli of Borsippa, during the reign of the Babylonian king Adad-apla-iddina (1069–1046 BC).

Along with contemporary ancient Egyptian medicine, the Babylonians introduced the concepts of diagnosis, prognosis, physical examination, and prescriptions. In addition, the Diagnostic Handbook introduced the methods of therapy and aetiology and the use of empiricism, logic and rationality in diagnosis, prognosis and therapy. The text contains a list of medical symptoms and often detailed empirical observations along with logical rules used in combining observed symptoms on the body of a patient with its diagnosis and prognosis.

The symptoms and diseases of a patient were treated through therapeutic means such as bandages, creams and pills. If a patient could not be cured physically, the Babylonian physicians often relied on exorcism to cleanse the patient from any curses. Esagil-kin-apli's Diagnostic Handbook was based on a logical set of axioms and assumptions, including the modern view that through the examination and inspection of the symptoms of a patient, it is possible to determine the patient's disease, its aetiology and future development, and the chances of the patient's recovery.

Esagil-kin-apli discovered a variety of illnesses and diseases and described their symptoms in his Diagnostic Handbook. These include the symptoms for many varieties of epilepsy and related ailments along with their diagnosis and prognosis. Later Babylonian medicine resembles early Greek medicine in many ways. In particular, the early treatises of the Hippocratic Corpus show the influence of late Babylonian medicine in terms of both content and form.

==== Literature ====
There were libraries and temples in most towns; an old Sumerian proverb averred that "he who would excel in the school of the scribes must rise with the dawn". Women as well as men learned to read and write, and in Semitic times, this involved knowledge of the extinct Sumerian language, and a complicated and extensive syllabary.

A considerable amount of Babylonian literature was translated from Sumerian originals, and the language of religion and law long continued to be written in the old agglutinative language of Sumer. Vocabularies, grammars, and interlinear translations were compiled for the use of students, as well as commentaries on the older texts and explanations of obscure words and phrases. The characters of the syllabary were all arranged and named, and elaborate lists of them were drawn up.

There are many Babylonian literary works whose titles have come down to us. One of the most famous of these was the Epic of Gilgamesh, in twelve books, translated from the original Sumerian by a certain Sin-liqi-unninni, and arranged upon an astronomical principle. Each division contains the story of a single adventure in the career of Gilgamesh. The whole story is a composite product, and it is probable that some of the stories are artificially attached to the central figure.

=== Neo-Babylonian culture ===
The brief resurgence of Babylonian culture in the 7th to 6th centuries BC was accompanied by a number of important cultural developments.

==== Astronomy ====
Among the sciences, astronomy and astrology still occupied a conspicuous place in Babylonian society. Astronomy was of old standing in Babylonia. The zodiac was a Babylonian invention of great antiquity; and eclipses of the sun and moon could be foretold. There are dozens of cuneiform records of original Mesopotamian eclipse observations.

Babylonian astronomy was the basis for much of what was done in ancient Greek astronomy, in classical, in Sasanian, Byzantine and Syrian astronomy, astronomy in the medieval Islamic world, and in Central Asian and Western European astronomy. Neo-Babylonian astronomy can thus be considered the direct predecessor of much of ancient Greek mathematics and astronomy, which in turn is the historical predecessor of the European (Western) Scientific Revolution.

During the 8th and 7th centuries BC, Babylonian astronomers developed a new approach to astronomy. They began studying philosophy dealing with the ideal nature of the early universe and began employing an internal logic within their predictive planetary systems. This was an important contribution to astronomy and the philosophy of science and some scholars have thus referred to this new approach as the first scientific revolution. This new approach to astronomy was adopted and further developed in Greek and Hellenistic astronomy.

In Seleucid and Parthian times, the astronomical reports were of a thoroughly scientific character; how much earlier their advanced knowledge and methods were developed is uncertain. The Babylonian development of methods for predicting the motions of the planets is considered to be a major episode in the history of astronomy.

The only Babylonian astronomer known to have supported a heliocentric model of planetary motion was Seleucus of Seleucia (b. 190 BC). Seleucus is known from the writings of Plutarch. He supported the heliocentric theory where the Earth rotated around its own axis which in turn revolved around the Sun. According to Plutarch, Seleucus even proved the heliocentric system, but it is not known what arguments he used.

==== Mathematics ====
Babylonian mathematical texts are plentiful and well edited. In respect of time they fall in two distinct groups: one from the First Babylonian dynasty period (1830–1531 BC), the other mainly Seleucid from the last three or four centuries BC. In respect of content there is scarcely any difference between the two groups of texts. Thus Babylonian mathematics remained stale in character and content, with very little progress or innovation, for nearly two millennia.

The Babylonian system of mathematics was sexagesimal, or a base 60 numeral system. From this we derive the modern-day usage of 60 seconds in a minute, 60 minutes in an hour, and 360 (60 × 6) degrees in a circle. The Babylonians were able to make great advances in mathematics for two reasons. First, the number 60 has many divisors (2, 3, 4, 5, 6, 10, 12, 15, 20, and 30), making calculations easier. Additionally, unlike the Egyptians and Romans, the Babylonians had a true place-value system, where digits written in the left column represented larger values (much as in our base-ten system: 734 = 7×100 + 3×10 + 4×1). Among the Babylonians' mathematical accomplishments were the determination of the square root of two correctly to seven places (YBC 7289). They also demonstrated knowledge of the Pythagorean theorem well before Pythagoras.

The ner of 600 and the sar of 3600 were formed from the unit of 60, corresponding with a degree of the equator. Tablets of squares and cubes, calculated from 1 to 60, have been found at Senkera, and a people acquainted with the sun-dial, the clepsydra, the lever and the pulley, must have had no mean knowledge of mechanics. A crystal lens, turned on the lathe, was discovered by Austen Henry Layard at Nimrud along with glass vases bearing the name of Sargon; this could explain the excessive minuteness of some of the writing on the Assyrian tablets, and a lens may also have been used in the observation of the heavens.

The Babylonians might have been familiar with the general rules for measuring area. They are also known for the Babylonian mile, which was a measure of distance equal to about 11 kilometres (7 mi) today. This measurement for distances eventually was converted to a time-mile used for measuring the travel of the Sun, therefore, representing time. (Eves, Chapter 2) The Babylonians used also space time graphs to calculate the velocity of Jupiter. This is an idea that is considered highly modern, traced to the 14th century England and France and anticipating integral calculus.

==== Philosophy ====
The origins of Babylonian philosophy can be traced back to early Mesopotamian wisdom literature, which embodied certain philosophies of life, particularly ethics, in the forms of dialectic, dialogs, epic poetry, folklore, hymns, lyrics, prose, and proverbs. Babylonian reasoning and rationality developed beyond empirical observation.

It is possible that Babylonian philosophy had an influence on Greek philosophy, particularly Hellenistic philosophy. The Babylonian text Dialogue of Pessimism contains similarities to the Agnostic thought of the sophists, the Heraclitean doctrine of contrasts, and the dialogs of Plato, as well as a precursor to the maieutic Socratic method of Socrates. The Milesian philosopher Thales is also known to have studied philosophy in Mesopotamia.

According to the assyriologist Marc Van de Mieroop, Babylonian philosophy was a highly developed system of thought with a unique approach to knowledge and a focus on writing, lexicography, divination, and law. It was also a bilingual intellectual culture, based on Sumerian and Akkadian.

== Legacy ==
Babylonia, and particularly its capital city Babylon, has long held a place in the Abrahamic religions as a symbol of excess and dissolute power. Many references are made to Babylon in the Bible, both literally (historical) and allegorically. The mentions in the Tanakh tend to be historical or prophetic, while New Testament apocalyptic references to the Whore of Babylon are more likely figurative, or cryptic references possibly to pagan Rome, or some other archetype. The legendary Hanging Gardens of Babylon and the Tower of Babel are seen as symbols of luxurious and arrogant power respectively.

== See also ==
- Timeline of the Assyrian Empire

== Bibliography ==
- Theophilus G. Pinches, The Religion of Babylonia and Assyria (Many deities' names are now read differently, but this detailed 1906 work is a classic.)
- Chisholm, Hugh, ed. (1911). "Babylonian and Assyrian Religion" . Encyclopædia Britannica (11th ed.). Cambridge University Press.
- Sayce, Archibald Henry (1878). "Babylon–Babylonia" . In Baynes, T. S. (ed.). Encyclopædia Britannica. Vol. 3 (9th ed.). New York: Charles Scribner's Sons. pp. 182–194.
- Herbermann, Charles, ed. (1913). "Babylonia" . Catholic Encyclopedia. New York: Robert Appleton Company.
- The History Files Ancient Mesopotamia
- "Legends of Babylon and Egypt in Relation to Hebrew Tradition", by Leonard W. King, 1918
- "The Babylonian Legends of the Creation", as told by Assyrian Tablets from Nineveh, 1921
- "The Civilization of Babylonia and Assyria", by Morris Jastrow Jr., 1915
- Philosophy before the Greeks. The Pursuit of Truth in Ancient Babylonia. Princeton University Press. 2015. ISBN 978-0691157184.
