= Ninurta-apla-X =

- King of Babylon
- Reign: 9th/8th century BC
- Predecessor: Interregnum; Baba-aḫa-iddina (last known predecessor)
- Successor: Marduk-bēl-zēri
- House: Dynasty of E (mixed dynasties)

Ninurta-apla-X was a 9th/8th century BC king of Babylon during the period of mixed dynasties known as the dynasty of E. The name as currently given is based upon a 1920s reading that is no longer supported by direct evidence as the document from which it was derived is now too badly damaged to discern the characters proposed.

== Biography ==
His most recent predecessor known by name was Baba-aḫa-iddina, whose reign ended perhaps around twelve years earlier. During the interregnum there was no king for several years. (Note: Chronicle 24 r 8.) The only records of events during this period come from the chronicles of the Assyrian eponym dating system. These record that Šamši-Adad V’s seventh campaign was against Babylonia. His successor, Adad-nirari III, initially campaigned in the west (Note: Stele, BM 131124.) but during 802 BC the chronicle records "to the sea," thought to be Sealand of southern Mesopotamia. In 795 and 794 BC he campaigned in Dēr. The Synchronistic History (Note: Synchronistic History (ABC 21), K4401a + Rm 854.) ended with his reign and records:

(The) king of Karduniaš, bowed down ... He brought back the abducted people and granted them an income, privileges, and barley rations. The peoples of Assyria and Karduniaš were joined together. They fixed the boundary-line by mutual consent.

— Synchronistic History, Column 4, lines 15–16 and 19–22.

Ninurta-apla-X's successor was the similarly obscure king, Marduk-bēl-zēri.
