= Baba-aha-iddina =

Baba-aḫa-iddina
- King of Babylon
- Reign: ca. 812 BC
- Predecessor: Marduk-balāssu-iqbi
- Successor: Interregnum; Ninurta-apla-X (earliest known successor)
- House: Dynasty of E (mixed dynasties)

Bāba-aḫa-iddina, typically inscribed ^{md}BA.Ú-PAB-AŠ (Note: Synchronistic Kinglist fragment, Ass. 13956dh, KAV 182, iii 14 and Ass. 14616c, iii 22 (restored).) 'Bau has given me a brother', ca. 812 BC, was the 9th king of the Dynasty of E, a mixed dynasty of kings of Babylon, but probably for less than a year. He briefly succeeded Marduk-balāssu-iqbi, who had been deposed by the Assyrians, a fate he was to share.

== Biography ==
His name was traditionally the name of a second son. He may have been a paqid mātāti official attested in the earlier reign, possibly from the Babylonian nobility who was the son of an otherwise unknown individual named Lidanu. This is a prebend grant (Note: Legal text A 33600, excavation reference 4NT 3, 17’.) from the second year of Marduk-balāssu-iqbi which records him as a witness: ^{md}BA.Ú-ŠEŠ-SUM-na DUMU ^{m}li-da-nu LÚ.PA É.KUR.MEŠ.

His reign was brought to its end by the sixth campaign of the Assyrian king, Šamši-Adad V, as described in his Annals: (Note: Ashur Stele, AfO 9, p. 100, iv 15–29.) "In Ni ... I besieged [him]. By means of boring and siege machines [I c]aptured that [city]. Bāba-aḫa-iddina together with the standard (^{d}urigallu) ... I took away." A more detailed account of the events following this victory is provided in the Synchronistic History:

He encircled the city and he himself took it. He took Bāba-aḫa-iddina with his wealth and palace treasures to Assyria. He t[ook] the gods and the booty of Dēr, Lahiru, Gannanāti, Dur-Papsukkal, Bıt-riduti, Mê-Turan, numerous cities of Karduniaš with their surroundings. He took away Anu the great Ḫumḫumia, Šarrat-Dēri, Bēlet-Akkadī, Šimalyia, Palil, Annunītu, Mār-Bīti of Māliku. He went up to Cutha, Babylon (and) Borsippa (and) performed the sacred services. He went down to Chaldea. In Chaldea he received the tribute of its kings. His officers collected gifts from Karduniaš. He did [ ... Together they established] a permanent boundary line.

— Synchronistic Chronicle, Column 4, lines 1 to 14. (Note: The Synchronistic Chronicle (ABC 21) iv 1–14.)

Šamši-Adad made no attempt to annex Babylonia which remained independent, though kingless for a period, but returned to Assyria where he spent his last year, according to the eponym record, "in the land." Finkel and Reade proposed a restoration of the final, broken part of the Synchronistic History to give: "Adad-nirari III king of Assyria and B[aba-aḫa-iddina king of Karduniaš towards each other], bowed and drank wine. The welf[are of their lands they established] ..." They suggested that a pro-Babylonian Šammur-amat, while acting as Assyrian regent for the boy-king Adad-nirari, may have moved to have Bāba-aḫa-iddina reinstated to stabilize their southern neighbor.
