= Marduk-balassu-iqbi =

Marduk-balāssu-iqbi
- King of Babylon
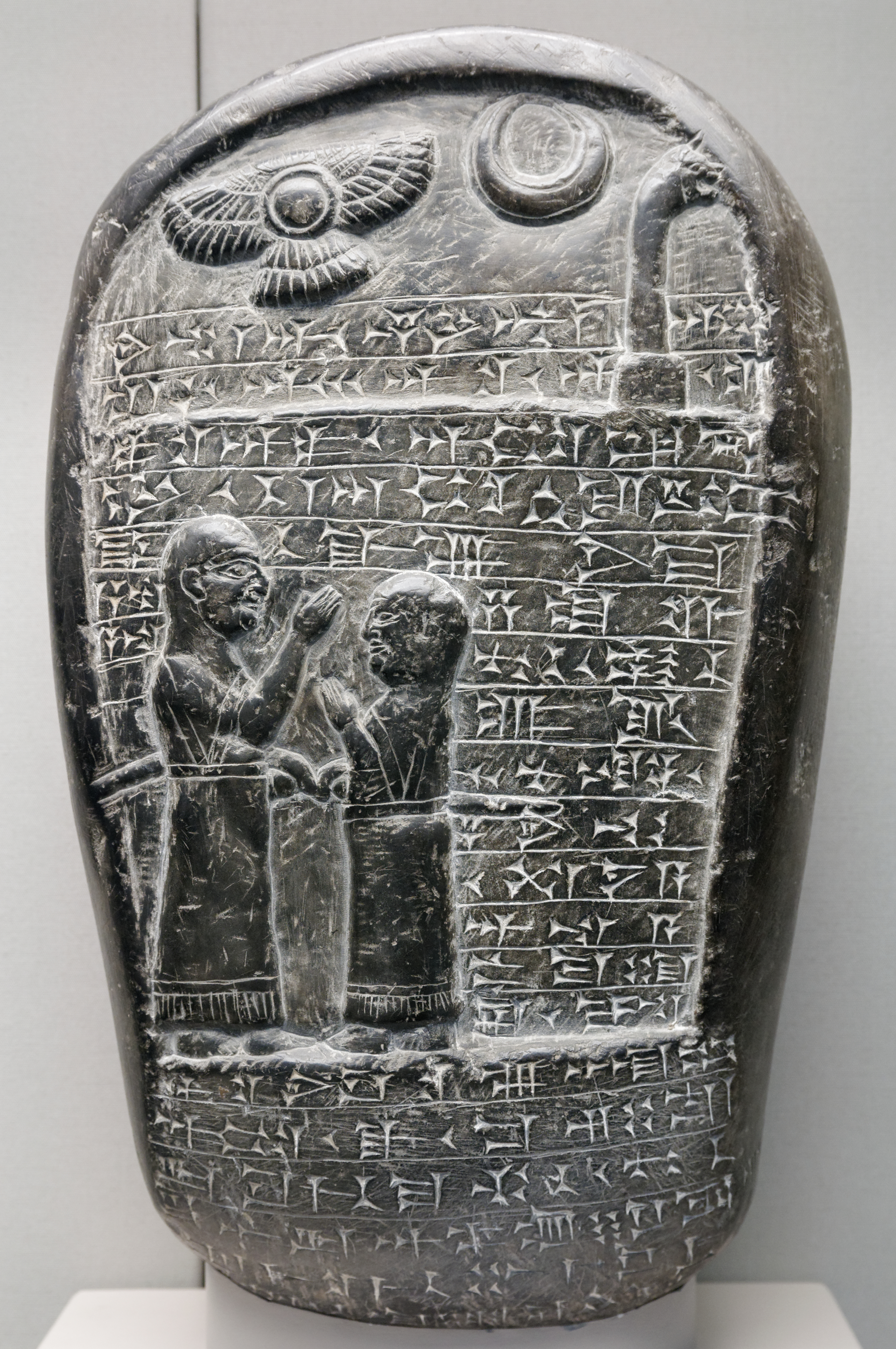
- Kudurru of Adad-eṭir, mentioning a Marduk-balāssu-iqbi, a 9th century BC monument. (Note: Kudurru BM 90834.)
- Reign: Late 9th century BC
- Predecessor: Marduk-zakir-šumi I
- Successor: Baba-aha-iddina
- House: Dynasty of E (mixed dynasties)

Marduk-balāssu-iqbi, inscribed ^{md}AMAR.UTU-TI-su-iq-bi (Note: Kudurru AO 6684 in the Louvre, published as RA 16 (1919) 126 iv 17.) or ^{md}SID-TI-zu-DUG_{4}, (Note: Synchronistic King List fragment, Ass 13956dh (KAV 182), iii 13.) meaning "Marduk has promised his life," was the 8th king of the Dynasty of E of Babylon; he was the successor of his father Marduk-zākir-šumi I, and was the 4th and final generation of Nabû-šuma-ukin I's family to reign. He was contemporary with his father's former ally, Šamši-Adad V of Assyria, who may have been his brother-in-law, who was possibly married to his (Marduk's) sister Šammu-ramat, the legendary Semiramis, and who was to become his nemesis.

== Biography ==
He was recorded as a witness on a kudurru dated to his father's 2nd year, 25 years before he ascended the throne, suggesting he was fairly elderly when he assumed power, and he may be a witness on another kudurru, (Note: The Sun God tablet BM 91000 published as BBSt 36, vi 24.) dated to his grandfather's 31st year, although this individual is identified as the bēl pīḫati, or a "provincial administrator," a "son" of Arad-Ea. The kudurru pictured is a ṣalmu or commemorative granite stele to Adad-eṭir, the dagger-bearer of Marduk, by his eldest son, where the name Marduk-balāssu-iqbi appears in the context of the donor and possibly may not be the king. The fourth line reads "the king his lord, Marduk-balāssu-iqbi," leading some to assign it to his reign although it is without a succeeding royal determinative and is followed by mārušu rabū, "his eldest son." It is, however, an inscription of this era. He receives a fleeting mention in the Eclectic Chronicle alongside his father. (Note: Chronicle 24, tablet BM 27859, r 7.)

He seems to have made his capital at Gannanāti, a town on the Diyāla River; he engaged in construction activity in Seleucia, and exerted control over territory encompassing both Dēr and Nippur. His officials, like him, seem to have received their positions through inheritance, such as Enlil-apla-uṣur, the šandabakku or governor of Nippur, and the sons of Tuballiṭ-Ešdar, the sukkallus (court personnel) and šākin ṭēmi (a regional governor), suggesting weak central authority and some local autonomy in the provinces.

=== Šamši-Adad's campaigns ===
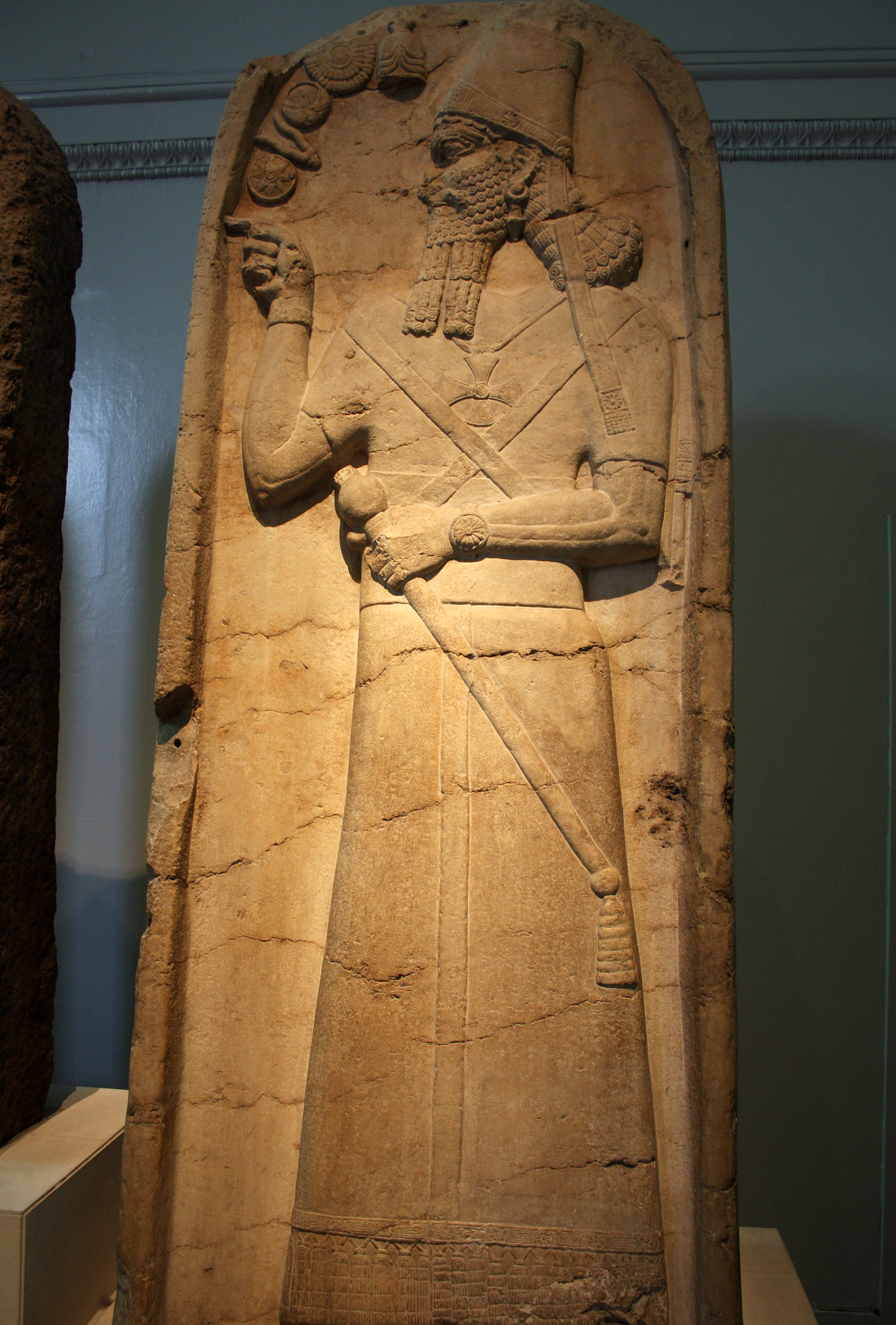
The Nimrud Stele of Šamši-Adad V recording his Annals. (Note: The Nimrud Stele, BM 118892, first published as I R 31, iii 70 to iv 45.)

The Assyrians, under Šamši-Adad V (ca. 823-811 BC), led two successive campaigns against him, the first of which was his fourth since coming to power. The motivation for these assaults is uncertain, however, Šamši-Adad may have harbored some resentment to the inferior position he had been placed into, in a treaty with Marduk-balāssu-iqbi's immediate predecessor, Marduk-zâkir-šumi.

The eponym year of Šamaš-ilaya (818/817 BC) records a campaign against "[...]šumme." The later eponym years of Inurta-ašared and Šamaš-kumua record campaigns against Chaldea and Babylon respectively, and these are thought to correspond with the second campaign against Marduk-balāssu-iqbi and the subsequent overthrow of his successor, Bāba-aḫa-iddina. There is an intervening eponym year of Bêl-lu-ballat which records "campaign against Dēr; Anu the Great went to Dēr" (ca. 814/813 BC), which probably best represents this first assault.

The campaign route followed the course of the eastern side of the Tigris along the edge of the mountains, as the direct route into Babylonia was blocked by the fortress of Zaddi, the northernmost town in Babylonia at this time, a little way south of the Lesser Zab. According to his Annals, (Note: Fragmentary copy BM 115020 from Nineveh.) (Note: Assur Stele, Ass. 6596, published as AfO 9 90–101, iii 1 to iv 10.) Šamši-Adad paused to hunt and kill three fierce lions on the slopes of Mount Epih (Jebel Hamrin) and then proceeded to leave a trail of devastation in his wake, besieging the town of Me-Turnat on the bank of the Diyāla, which he then crossed at high water, to take and burn, the royal city of Qarne. He looted Di’bina and then assaulted Gannanāti's suburbs, Datebir and Izduja. He sacked Qiribti-alani, boasting that he had carried away "(the inhabitant's) spoil, their property, gods, oxen (and) sheep." Then he despoiled the royal city of Dur-Papsukkal, near Dēr after which he seems to have been successfully countered with a grand alliance of Chaldeans, Elamites, Kassites and Arameans, although the Synchronistic History describes how the Assyrian king "filled the plain with the corpses of (Marduk-balāssu-iqbi's) warriors," (Note: Synchronistic History, tablet fragment Sm. 2106 rev. iii 6–9.) and his annals record his capture of chariots, cavalry and some of the camp furniture.

The second campaign was apparently a more surgical affair, with Šamši-Adad making a bee-line straight for Gannanāti, causing Marduk-balāssu-iqbi to flee to the Diyāla region where he sought refuge initially in Nimitti-šarri (Aḫišānu) but was cornered following the capture of Dēr and led away in chains to Assyria. Šamši-Adad boasted thirty thousand captives were deported from Dēr in his Gottesbrief, (Note: Tablet VAT 9628.) a diviner's literary text recording an address to the king from the god Aššur, from the city of Aššur.

A brick inscription excavated at Tall ‘Umar, ancient Seleucia, in 1933, a neo-Babylonian copy of a legal text recovered from Nippur in 1951 dated to his second year, (Note: Tablet A 33600, 4NT 3.) and a humorous school text, Ninurta-Pāqidāt's Dog Bite, are the only extant contemporary texts. The legal text gives as a witness, a certain ^{md}BA.Ú-ŠEŠ-SUM-na, an official who may possibly have been his eventual successor, Bāba-aḫa-iddina.
