= Adasi =

- village
- Location in Maharashtra, India Adasi (India)
- Coordinates: 21.020814°N 80.32754°E
- Country: India
- State: Maharashtra
- District: Gondia

Languages
  - Official: Marathi
- Time zone: UTC+5:30 (IST)

Adasi is a small village in Gondia district, Maharashtra state, India.
