= Middle Babylonian period =

Period of the Babylonian civilization in Mesopotamia (c. 1595–1155 BCE)

- c. 1595 BC – c. 1155 BC
- Old Babylonian period
- Old Assyrian period
- Old Elamite period
- Isin-Larsa period
- Neo-Babylonian period
- Middle Assyrian period
- Middle Elamite Period
- Neo-Assyrian period
- Neo-Elamite Period
- Babylonia c. 13th century BC
- Location: Babylonia
- Monarch(s): Burnaburiash I (first king); Enlil-nadin-ahi (last king)
- Key events: Sack of Babylon c. 1595 BC; Assyrian and Elamite invasions c. 1158 BC

The Middle Babylonian period, also known as the Kassite period, in southern Mesopotamia is dated from c. 1595 – c. 1155 BC and began after the Hittites sacked the city of Babylon. The Kassites, whose dynasty is synonymous with the period, eventually assumed political control over the region and consolidated their power by subjugating the Sealand dynasty c. 1475 BC. After the subjugation of the Sealand dynasty, the Kassites unified the region of Babylonia into a single political entity. At the height of the Middle Babylonian period, the Kassite kings were engaging in commerce, trade, and organising diplomatic marriages with the kings of Egypt and other regional powers. However, after a period of gradual decline, the Middle Babylonian period collapsed with the fall of the Kassite dynasty c. 1155 BC. The collapse came as a result of an Assyrian invasion (c. 1232 – c. 1225 BC), that temporarily displaced the Kassites from their rule over southern Mesopotamia. Finally, the Elamites conducted various raids and eventually invaded Babylonian c. 1158 BC, which brought the Kassite dynasty and Middle Babylonian period to an end.

There are however differing chronologies of the period proposed by some contemporary scholars, with some suggesting that the Middle Babylonian period only proceeded the collapse of the Kassite period of c. 1150 BC. While other scholars take the whole period of c. 1595 – c. 626 BC as constituting the Middle Babylonian period.

== Sack of Babylon (c. 1595 BC) ==
Prior to 1595 BC, during the Old Babylonian period, the region of southern Mesopotamia was in a period of gradual decline and political uncertainty after the successors of Hammurabi were unable to maintain their kingdom. The successors had lost control of the lucrative trade routes between the northern and southern regions of Babylonia to the First Sealand dynasty which had detrimental economic ramifications. In c. 1595 BC, the Hittite king Mursili I invaded the region of southern Mesopotamia after having defeated the powerful neighbouring kingdom of Aleppo. The Hittites proceeded to sack the city of Babylon which ended the Hammurabi dynasty and Old Babylonian period. However, the Hittites chose not to subjugate Babylon or the surrounding regions and instead withdrew from the conquered city up the Euphrates River to their homeland "Hatti-land". The Hittite's decision to invade southern Mesopotamia and sack the city of Babylon is subject to debate among contemporary historians. It is suggested that the successors of Hammurabi were either allied with Aleppo, or the sudden Hittite expansion indicates that their motives were "land, manpower, control of [trade] routes and access to valuable ore-deposits".

== Dark age and Kassite unification (c. 1595 – c. 1475 BC) ==
Following the Hittites withdrawal from Babylon, the region was plunged into further political turmoil. During this period, the Kassites, who were a relatively unknown group of people in Babylonia, emerged as the preeminent authority. The precise events that led to the Kassites coming to power are uncertain, with contemporary scholars labelling this period as a dark-age given the lack of primary evidence. However, it is known that following the Hittite's withdrawal from southern Mesopotamia the First Sealand dynasty under Gulkishar briefly captured and occupied the city of Babylon and the northern regions of Babylonia. The Kassites ended the Sealand's occupation of the captured territories and during the reign of King Ulamburiash I, they consolidated their authority in c. 1475 BC by subjugating the First Sealand dynasty, who now only occupied the southern coastal and swampland regions of Mesopotamia. By conquering the Sealand's territories, the Kassites were able to reestablish the previously disrupted lucrative trade routes in the area. After the subjugation of the Sealand dynasty, the Kassites had successfully unified the whole of southern Babylonia into a centralised political entity and established the Kingdom of Babylonia (known in international correspondence as māt Karduniaš). Prior to this point in Near Eastern history, southern Babylonia had not been controlled by one ruling entity. From then onward, the Kassite kings would adopt the title of 'King of Babylonia', and were referred by their regional neighbours as 'Kings of the land Karduniash', the later being the non-Kassite term for Babylonia.

== Regional power (c. 1415 – c. 1235 BC) ==
The unification of Babylonia as a single centralised political entity enabled the Kassites to establish a sustained period of stability and economic prosperity for southern Mesopotamia.

=== Dur-Kurigalzu ===
In particular, the Kassites utilised the period of economic prosperity to undertake construction and reconstruction projects all over Babylonia. Notably, during the reign of King Kurigalzu I, the Kassites relocated the administrative capital of the kingdom to Dur-Kurigalzu ("Fortress of Kurigalzu"). Whilst the previous capital Babylon became the ceremonial and religious capital. The precise motives behind the Kassite's decision to construct a new capital are not known to contemporary historians. However, it is suggested that the city's location, where the Euphrates and Tigris rivers run closest indicates it was either to protect the lucrative trade routes in the region or to safeguard the kingdom against its imperialistic neighbours.

=== Foreign relations ===
Foreign relations between the Kassites and their regional neighbours are recorded in the Amarna letters, which are cuneiform tablets that were used for correspondence between the kings of Egypt and the Kassite kings, in particular the reigns of Kadashman-Enlil I (1375–1360 BC) and Burnaburiash II (1359–1333 BC). The tablets outlined politically advantageous marriages and the "exchange of substantial bridal gifts and dowries". Moreover, the letters outlined trade between the regional powers. For example, the Kassites frequently traded with Egypt and were known for their "horses, chariots and lapis lazuli and precious stones, bronze, silver, and oil".

The Amarna letters also outline an ancient Near Eastern political partnership between the preeminent powers of the fourteenth century BC called the "Great Powers Club". This political partnership included states such as Egypt, Hatti, Mittani and Assyria. The exact purpose for the establishment of the Great Powers Club is unclear, however its function can be broadly understood as a regional partnership between neighbouring powers who had established norms for communication and desired to "regulate peace and war, trade and marriages, boarder disputes and exchange of messages". However, the power distribution within the partnership was not equal among all of its members. For example, princesses from Egypt marrying Asiatic kings constituted an ideological issue for the Egyptians and was a rarity. Whilst conversely, Asiatic princesses were commonly wedded to Egyptian royalty and nobility however, they were not considered as the primary partner and were instead part of the man's harem.

Relations between the regional partners began to gradually decline in the twelfth century BC during the reigns of the Egyptian pharaohs Amenophis III (1391–1353 BC) and Akhenaton (1353–1336 BC). In this period, the pharaohs became less concerned with the affairs of their Asiatic neighbours which led to the breakdown of the partnerships.

== End of period (c. 1225 – c. 1155 BC) ==
The fall of the Kassite dynasty and end of Middle Babylonian period came in c. 1155 BC after continuous raids and invasions by their regional neighbours, the Assyrians and Elamites.

=== Assyrians subjugate Babylonia ===
During the reign of the Assyrian king Tukulti-Ninurta I (1233–1197 BC), Babylonia was invaded and the Kassite king Kashtiliashu IV (1232–1225 BC) was overthrown. Tukulti-Ninurta subjugated the region through a puppet-regime and removed the statue of Babylon's patron god Marduk and took it to Assyria. The neighbouring Elamites, led by the king Kidin-Hudrudiš (also known as Kidin-Hutran), later on invaded Babylonia and sacked the cities of Nippur, Isin, Marad and Der, which resulted in discontentment toward the Assyrian regime. Eventually, revolts in Babylonia and Assyria brought Tukulti-Ninurta's occupation of Babylonia to an end. Following the end of the Assyrian subjugation and puppet-regime, Adad-suma-usur, a descendant of the previous Kassite ruler Kashtiliashu IV regained power in southern Babylonian for the Kassites.

=== Assyrian and Elamite invasions ===
The eventual collapse of the Kassite dynasty, and end of the Middle Babylonian period, came in two successive invasions by the Assyrians and Elamites. In 1158 BC the Assyrians invaded Babylonia, which was subsequently followed in the same year by an Elamite invasion. The last king of the Kassite dynasty was Enlil-nadin-ahi, who reigned for a period of three years prior to being overthrown and captured by the Elamites. The Elamites chose not to subjugate Babylonian and instead the non-Kassite, Second Dynasty of Isin took power in the region.

== Chronology debate ==
There are various alternative chronologies proposed by contemporary historians as to the exact dating of the Middle Babylonian period. This is in part because of the Assyrian control of Babylonia being unstable, and the continued similarities in material culture. Some historians designate the Middle Babylonian period as having proceeded the collapse of the Kassite period (c. 1150 BC) and having ended in 626 BC, with the subsequent emergence of the Neo-Babylonian Empire. While other historians use 'Middle Babylonian' and 'post-Kassite' as names for distinct periods, with the Middle Babylonian period containing the Kassite dynasty (c. 1595–1155 BC), and sometimes the later Second Dynasty of Isin (c. 1153–1022 BC), with the proceeding dynasties being grouped under the 'post-Kassite' period. Other interpretations by contemporary historians designate the entire period between the end of the Old Babylonian period in c. 1595 BC and the rise of Neo-Babylonian Empire c. 626 BC as constituting the 'Middle Babylonian' period.

== Lists of kings of Babylon during the Middle Babylonian period (c. 1595 – c. 1155 BC) ==
The King List A tablet that contains the names of the rulers from the First Dynasty (c. 1894 BC) to the Neo-Assyrian Empire (600 BC) is damaged. Therefore, the precise chronology and names for some of the rulers is uncertain or unknown to contemporary historians.

=== Kassite period (c. 1595 – c. 1155 BC) ===
==== Second dynasty of Babylon (c. 1595 – c. 1475 BC) ====
King	Reign	Notes and references
Iliman	c. 1725 BC (60 years)	
Ittili	c. 1700 BC (56 years)	
Unknown	c. 1683 BC	
Damqili	c. 1677 BC (36 years)	
Ishkibal	c. 1641 BC (15 years)	
Shushushi	c. 1616 BC (24 years)	
Gulkishar	c. 1595 BC (55 years)	
Gishen	c. 1595 BC	
Peshgaldaramesh	c. 1595 – c. 1545 BC (50 years)	
Ayadaragalama	c. 1545 – c. 1517 BC (28 years)	
Ekurul	c. 1517 – c. 1491 BC (26 years)	
Melamma	c. 1491 – c. 1484 BC (7 years)	
Eaga	c. 1484 – c. 1475 BC (9 years)	

==== Third dynasty of Babylon (c. 1475 – c. 1155 BC) ====
King List A – Middle Babylonian period kings
King	Reign	Notes and references
Gandas	c. 1729 – c. 1703 BC (26 years)	
Agum I	c. 1703 – c. 1681 BC (22 years)	
Kashtiliash I	c. 1681 – c. 1659 BC (22 years)	
Usssi	c. 1659 – c. 1595 BC	
Abiratash	c. 1659 – c. 1595 BC	
Kashtiliash II	c. 1659 – c. 1595 BC	
Urzigurumas	c. 1659 – c. 1595 BC	
Agum II	c. 1595 – c. 1480 BC	
Harbasiu	c. 1595 – c. 1480 BC	
Tipetaquezi	c. 1595 – c. 1480 BC	
Unknown	c. 1595 – c. 1480 BC	
Burnaburiash I	c. 1595 – c. 1480 BC	
Ulamburiash	c. 1480 – c. 1375 BC	Unified Southern Babylonia into a single political entity by defeating the First Sealand dynasty.
Kashtiliash III	c. 1480 – c. 1375 BC	
Agum III	c. 1480 – c. 1375 BC	
Kadashman-Sah	c. 1480 – c. 1375 BC	
Karaindash	c. 1480 – c. 1375 BC	
Kadashman-Harbe I	c. 1480 – c. 1375 BC	
Kurigalzu I	c. 1480 – c. 1375 BC	Relocated the capital of the Babylonian Empire to Dur-Kurigalzu ("Fort of Kurigalzu").
Kadashman-Enlil I	c. 1375 – c. 1360 BC (15 years)	
Burnaburiash II	c. 1360 – c. 1333 BC (27 years)	
Kara-hardash	c. 1333 – c. 1332 BC (1 year)	
Nazi-Bugash	c. 1333 – c. 1332 BC (1 year)	
Kurigalzu II	c. 1332 – c. 1308 BC (24 years)	
Nazi-Maruttash	c. 1308 – c. 1282 BC (26 years)	
Kadashman-Turgu	c. 1282 – c. 1264 BC (18 years)	
Kadashman-Enlil II	c. 1264 – c. 1255 BC (9 years)	
Kudur-Enlil	c. 1255 – c. 1246 BC (9 years)	
Shagarakti-Shuriash	c. 1246 – c. 1233 BC (13 years)	
Kashtiliash IV	c. 1233 – c. 1225 BC (8 years)	Deposed by King Tukulti-Ninurta I during the Assyrian invasion of Southern Babylonia.
Enlil-nadin-shumi	c. 1225 – c. 1224 BC (6 months)	Appointee of Tukulti-Ninurta I under Assyrian occupation of Southern Babylonia.
Kadashman-Harbe II	c. 1224 – c. 1223 BC (1 year and 6 months)	Appointee of Tukulti-Ninurta I.
Adad-shuma-iddina	c. 1223 – c. 1217 BC (6 years)	Appointee of Tukulti-Ninurta I.
Adad-shuma-usur	c. 1217 – c. 1187 BC (30 years)	Descendant of Kashtiliash IV who gained the Babylonian throne after a revolt against Assyrian occupation.
Meli-Shipak	c. 1187 – c. 1172 BC (15 years)	
Marduk-alpa-iddina I	c. 1172 – c. 1159 BC (13 years)	
Zababa-shuma-iddin	c. 1159 – c. 1158 BC (1 year)	Deposed by the Elamites after separate invasions by the Elamites and Assyrians.
Enlil-nadin-ahi	c. 1158 – c. 1155 BC (3 years)	Deposed and captured by the Elamites after their invasion of Southern Babylonia, ending the Middle Babylonian period and Kassite dynasty.

=== Post-Kassite period (c. 1155 – c. 626 BC) ===
==== Fourth dynasty of Babylon (c. 1155 – c. 1022 BC) ====
King	Reign	Notes and references
Marduk-kabit-ahheshu	c. 1153 – c. 1135 BC (18 years)	
Itti-Marduk-balatu	c. 1135 – c. 1129 BC (6 years)	
Ninurta-nadin-shumi	c. 1129 – c. 1122 BC (7 years)	
Nebuchadnezzar I	c. 1122 – c. 1100 BC (22 years)	
Enlil-nadin-apli	c. 1100 – c. 1096 BC (4 years)	
Marduk-nadin-ahhe	c. 1096 – c. 1078 BC (18 years)	
Marduk-shapik-zeri	c. 1078 – c. 1065 BC (13 years)	
Adad-apla-iddina	c. 1065 – c. 1041 BC (24 years)	
Marduk-ahhe-eriba	c. 1041 BC (6 months)	
Marduk-zer-X	c. 1041 – c. 1029 BC (12 years)	
Nabu-shum-libur	c. 1029 – c. 1022 BC (7 years)	

==== Fifth dynasty of Babylon (c. 1022 – c. 1000 BC) ====
King	Reign	Notes and references
Simbar-shipak	c. 1022 – c. 1004 BC (17 or 18 years)	
Ea-mukin-zeri	c. 1004 – c. 1003 BC (3 or 5 months)	
Kashshu-nadin-ahi	c. 1003 – c. 1000 BC (3 years)	

==== Sixth dynasty of Babylon (c. 1000 – c. 981 BC) ====
King	Reign	Notes and references
Eulmash-shakin-shumi	c. 1000 – c. 984 BC (14 or 17 years)	
Ninurta-kudurri-usur I	c. 984 – c. 982 BC (2 or 3 years)	
Shirikti-shuqamuna	c. 982 – c. 981 BC (3 months)	

==== Seventh dynasty of Babylon (c. 981 – c. 975 BC) ====
King	Reign	Notes and references
Mar-biti-apla-usur	c. 981 – c. 975 BC (6 years)	
