= Kashtiliash III =

Kaštiliašu III
- King of Babylon
- Reign: c. 1500 BC
- Predecessor: Burnaburiaš I
- Successor: Agum III
- House: Kassite

Kaštiliašu III, phonetically inscribed in cuneiform as ^{m}Kaš-til-ia-šu, was a possible Kassite king of Babylonia in the 15th century BC (Short Chronology). He is known only from the Assyrian Synchronistic King List, (Note: Synchronistic King List, Ass 14616c, KAV 216 [Weidner, AfO 3, line 21’.].) a copy of a monumental inscription, (Note: Moussaieff no. 254 Kaštiliašu Royal Inscription.) his genealogy, and references in the Chronicle of Early Kings. (Note: Chronicle of Early Kings, BM 96152 (1902-4-12, 264) tablet B, reverse lines 13 and 15.)

== Sources ==
Evidence of Kaštiliašu's kingship is circumstantial. He may be the individual indicated on line 21 (Note: The apostrophe designates a reconstructed line designation.) of the Synchronistic King List where he is placed opposite Assyrian king Aššur-nārāri I and is preceded by a lacuna and succeeded by a poorly preserved name not thought to be Ulam-Buriaš. Two passages in the Chronicle of Early Kings mention Kaštiliašu: "Ulam-Buriaš, brother of Kaštiliašu, the Kassite" and "Agum, the son of Kaštiliašu". Ulam-Buriaš conquered and ruled the Sealand—at the southern end of Babylonia—and perhaps ruled as king of Babylonia, while Agum III was king of Babylonia. Kaštiliašu has no royal title in those passages, a feature of this chronicle shared by others, such as Samsu-Ditana, who, despite lacking monarchical epithets, proved to be kings.

A recently published copy of a monumental inscription celebrates his excavation of the Sumundar Canal and confirms his genealogy as the son of Burnaburiaš I, (Note: Inscribed as ^{m}[b]ur-na-bu-ra-ri-ia-aš, consistent with an early Kassite spelling.) and grandson of Agum II. It describes his ritual use of a silver spade and basket, which were subsequently displayed in the temple of Enlil, and his conscription of the people and land of Yamutbal for the excavation. Although he is designated as šakkanak Enlil, “governor of Enlil”, the title and subsequent elaborate curse formula against those who might later efface the inscription implies his regnal status.
