= Samsu-Ditana =

King of Babylonia

Samsu-ditāna
- Born: 17th century BC
- Died: 16th century BC
- Title: King of Babylon
- Term: 31 years; 1625–1595 (MC); 1617–1587 BC (LMC); 1562–1531 BC (SC)
- Predecessor: Ammī-ṣaduqa
- Successor: None

Samsu-ditāna, inscribed phonetically in cuneiform sa-am-su-di-ta-na in the seals of his servants, the 11th and last king of the Amorite or First Dynasty of Babylon, reigned for 31 years, (Note: BM 33332 Babylonian King List A i 2.) (Note: BM 38122 Babylonian King List B II.) 1625 – 1595 BC (Middle Chronology), 1617-1587 BC (Low Middle Chronology), or 1562 – 1531 BC (Short Chronology). Samsu-ditāna was, apparently, the son and successor of Ammī-ṣaduqa. His reign is best known for its termination with the sudden fall of Babylon at the hands of the Hittites.

== History ==
He was the great great grandson of Hammurabi and, although the Babylonian kingdom had shrunk considerably since its peak under this illustrious ancestor, it still extended north from Babylon and the Euphrates to Mari and Terqa. For the most part, he appears to have been non-belligerent and content to stay at home at the seat of his kingdom as none of his year names describe the waging of war or the building of monumental edifices. They are about pious gifts to the gods and the erection of statues dedicated to himself. None of his inscriptions have survived. A royal epic of Gulkišar, the 6th king of the 2nd Dynasty of Babylon, the Sealand Dynasty, describes his enmity against Samsu-ditāna.

=== Fall of Babylon ===
Samsu-ditāna apparently feared an attack as evidenced in extant tamitu texts, oracle questions addressed to the gods Šamaš and Adad, which name seven “rebel” enemies. However, he was powerless to prevent it, as the Babylonian state was in decay, with offices becoming hereditary, usurping royal prerogative, and payments accepted in lieu of military service to fund the bloated bureaucracy. The eventual coup-de-grace came from an unexpected quarter and his reign was brought to an abrupt end by a raid by the Hittite king, Muršili I in 1595 BC (High Middle Chronology), 1587 BC (Low Middle Chronology) 1531 BC (Short Chronology), which resulted in the sacking and complete devastation of Babylon. The Chronicle of Early Kings (Note: Chronicle of early kings (ABC 20) tablet BM 96152, reverse, line 11: ana tar-ṣi ^{m}Šamaš-di-ta-na ^{kur}Ḫat-tu-ú ana ^{kur}Akkadi^{ki} [illlik-ma].) tersely reported: “At the time of Samsu-ditāna, the Hittites marched against Akkad.” Muršili conquered just to seize loot and captives, without attempting any lasting occupation, a strategy he had previously employed in his opportunistic putsch against Halpa (ancient Aleppo). The Hittite account appears in the Edict of Telepinu, which relates: “Subsequently he marched to Babylon and he destroyed Babylon, and defeated the Hurrian troops, and brought captives and possessions of Babylon to Hattusa.” (Note: Edict of Telepinu (CTH19), KBo 3.1, KBo 7.15, KBo 12.4.)

He seized the statues of the Babylonian tutelary deity Marduk and his consort Sarpatinum and transported them to Ḫani where they would not be recovered until the reign of the Kassite king Agum-Kakrime some 24 years later. Babylon was left in ruins and was not reoccupied until the advent of the Kassite dynasty, where documents from Tell Muhammad are dated by the number of years after it was resettled for the reign of Šipta'ulzi.

== Inscriptions ==
Regnal titles
Preceded by Ammi-Saduqa	King of Babylon; 1625–1595 BC	Succeeded by Office abolished
