= Agum III =

Babylonian king

King of Babylon
- Reign: c. 1475 – c. 1440 BC
- Died: c. 1440 BC

Agum III (Note: Inscribed ^{m}A-gu-um in the Chronicle of Early Kings.) (died c. 1440 BC) was a Kassite king of Babylon. Speculatively, he might figure around the 13th position in the dynastic sequence; however, this part of the Kingslist A (Note: Kingslist A, tablet BM 33332 in the British Museum.) has a lacuna, shared with the Assyrian Synchronistic Kinglist. (Note: Kinglist A.117, Assur 14616c, in the İstanbul Arkeoloji Műzeleri.)

Agum III, possible son of Kashtiliash III, appears to have been one of the successors to Burnaburiash I, because he is mentioned in the Chronicle of Early Kings (Note: Chronicle of Early Kings (ABC 20) tablet BM 96152 in the British Museum, copy B, lines 16 through 18.) after Ulamburiash, who was a son of Burnaburiash I. Although this source does not give him a royal title, it is inconsistent in this regard and does say he called up his own army, ummānšu idkēma.

== Campaigns Against the Sealand and in Dilmun ==
Little is known about the king, with the only Babylonian reference to him from an expedition he led against "the Sealand", a region synonymous with Sumer, around 1465 BC, which is described in the Chronicle of Early Kings. His invasion followed that of Ulamburiash, described in the preceding lines of the chronicle, who had previously made himself “master of the land”, i.e. Sealand. Whether the campaign was against a competing Kassite kingdom, a restive province or a resurgent Sealand dynasty is not disclosed. He reputedly conquered the city of Dur-Enlil which is otherwise unknown and destroyed its temple of Egalgašešna, leaving him in control of all of southern Mesopotamia.

The excavation conducted by Béatrice André-Salvini (1995) in Bahrain, ancient Dilmun, yielded around 50 tablets some of which dated to Agum III, whose 3rd and 4th years are attested in the dates of texts found in the area of Qal’at al-Bahrain, when Kassite rule may have extended to the island. It has been suggested that following on from his successes conquering the Sealand, he crossed over to Bahrain, constructed a new palace and installed a local bureaucracy and by his 3rd and 4th years administrative documents began being dated to his reign. A problem arises with this theory due to the date formula. (Note: For example, month of Ajaru, 19th day, 4th year of Agum, in tablet QA94-49, a record of delivery of condiments, sesame and black cumin.) The later kings Kadashman-Harbe I and Kurigalzu I each have texts dated using the archaic “year name” style (Note: Tablet Ni 3199: “The year Kadašman-Ḫarbe, the king, dug the canal of Diniktum; Tablet D85: “19th day of Šabatu, the year Kurigalzu built the Ekurigibara.”) and it is not until their successors, Kadashman-Enlil I and Burna-Buriash II that regnal years count from the accession of a king.
