= Zababa-shuma-iddin =

Zababa-šuma-iddina
- King of Babylon
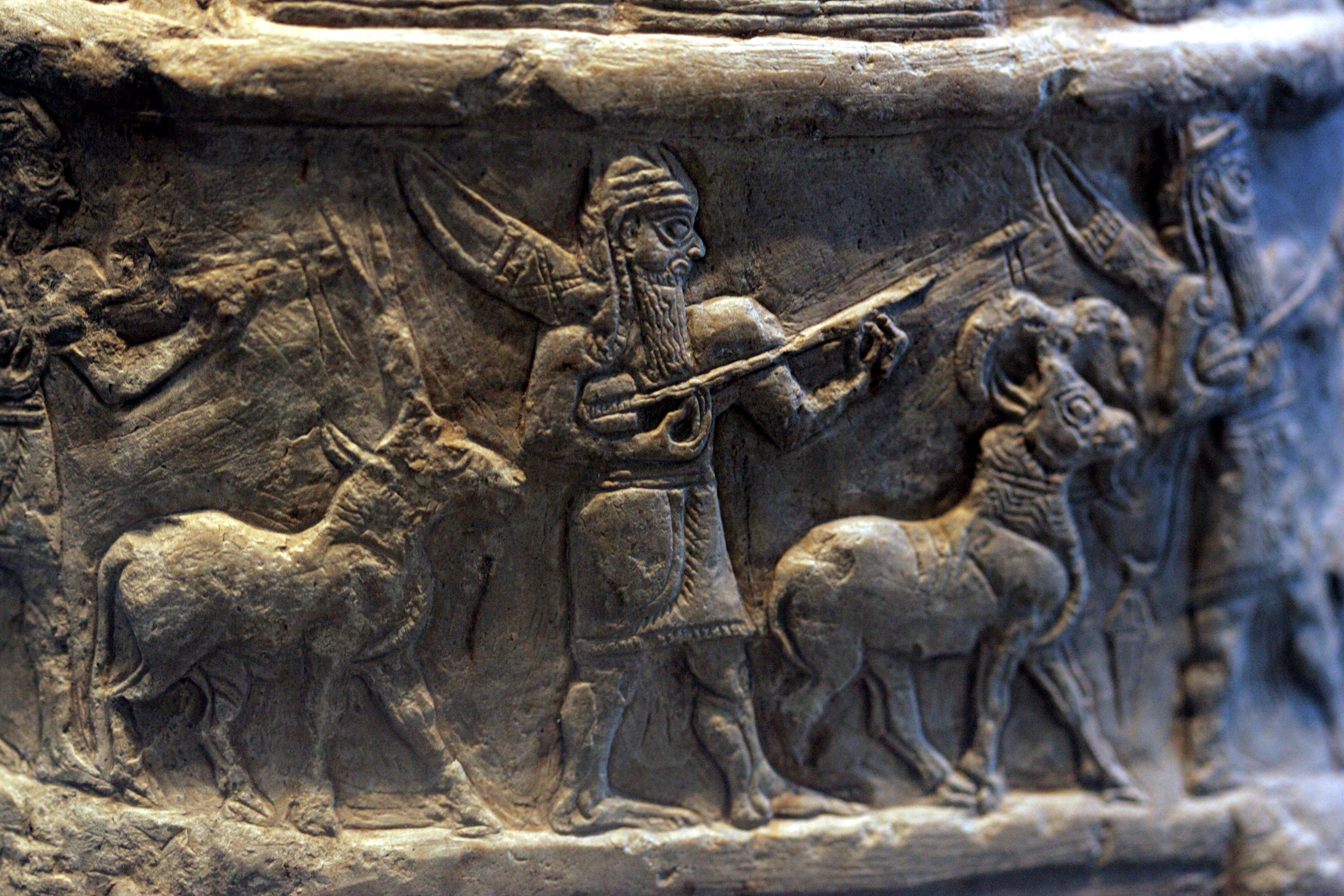
- Detail from unfinished kudurru found at Susa
- Reign: c. 1158 BC
- Predecessor: Marduk-apla-iddina I
- Successor: Enlil-nādin-aḫe
- House: Kassite

Zababa-šuma-iddina (Note: Written as ^{md}Za-ba_{4}-ba_{4}-MU-AŠ.) was the 35th and next to last king of the Kassite or 3rd dynasty of Babylon, who reigned for just one year, (Note: Kinglist A, column 2, line 14.) c. 1158 BC. He was without apparent ties to the royal family and there is uncertainty concerning the circumstances of his coming to power.

== Biography ==
=== Ascendancy ===
A late Assyrian tablet provides a prophetic narrative and suggests it was his predecessor Marduk-apla-iddina I, who did indeed reign for 13 years, and who was overthrown by the Elamites, perhaps combining the two sequential reigns into a single individual:

A prince will arise and will exercise kingship for 13 years. There will be an attack of Elam on Babylonia and the booty of Babylonia will be carried off. The shrines of the great gods will be ruined and Babylonia will be defeated. There will be chaos, upset, and trouble in the land, and the upper classes will lose power. Some other, unknown person will arise, will seize power as if a king, and will kill off the nobility.

— Prophecy A, Tablet (Note: Prophecy A, tablet VAT 10179 (KAR 421).)

=== Invasions by Assyria and Elam ===
His short unhappy reign was subjected to invasions on two different fronts. One of these was where Assyrian forces under the leadership of Aššur-dan I annexed the region lying between the Lower Zab and the Adhaim, or Al Uzaym River, seizing control of Zaban, Irriya and Urgarsallu, and carrying off much plunder. (Note: The Synchronistic Chronicle (ABC 21), K 4401a +, tablet B, column 2, lines 10 to 12.)

His lack of connection to the previous royal family into which the Elamite rulers had intermarried for several generations led Kudur-Nahhunte, king of Elam, and whose father, Shutruk-Nahhunte, was married to the thirty-third Babylonian king Meli-Šipak’s eldest daughter, to believe his claim to the throne of Babylon was more legitimate. A Neo-Babylonian copy of a literary text which takes the form of a letter, now located in the Vorderasiatisches Museum in Berlin, is addressed to the Kassite court by an Elamite King, thought to be Kudur-Nahhunte, and details the genealogy of the Elamite royalty of this period. He casts aspersions on their choice of king and then declares:

Why I, who am a king, son of a king, seed of a king, scion of a king, who am king (?) for the lands, for the land of Babylonia and the land of [El]am, descendant of the eldest daughter of the mighty King Kurigalzu, (why) do I not sit on the throne of the land of Babylonia? I sent you a sincere proposal; you however have granted me no reply: you may climb up to heaven – [but I’ll pull you down] by your hem; you may go down to hell – [but I’ll pull you up] by your hair! I shall destroy your cities, dem[olish] your fortresses, stop up your (irrigation) ditches, cut down your orchards, [pull out] the rings [of the sluices] at the mouths of your (irrigation) canals…

— Kudur-Nahhunte?, Letter to the Kassite court. (Note: Tablet VAT 17020.)

There are some concerns over the authenticity of this “letter” as it makes a derogatory reference to a later king, Nabu-apla-iddina, ca. 888 – 855 BC. It may, however, preserve some traditions of the period.

Kudur-Nahhunte led an assault on northern Babylonia which resulted in the end of Zababa-šuma-iddina’s reign. The event is described in a late Babylonian poetic text (Note: Tablet K. 2660.) purporting to be narrated by a later king, possibly Nabû-kudurrī-uṣur I. He left his inscriptions on many of the trophies he collected for display in the temples of Susa, each with its boastful addendum, to confirm it was he who had conquered Babylonia. A fragment of an Elemite stele describes crossing the river Ulai and seizing seven hundred towns. Another fragment lists the northern cities that had been overthrown including Dur-Kurigalzu, Sippar, Opis, perhaps Akkad and Eshnunna.

A single economic text, a contract (Note: Bab 39047.) mentioning Itti-ezida-lummir, is extant dated to his accession year and was recovered in the Merkes area of Babylon.
