= Ulamburiash =

Ulam-Buriaš
- King of Babylon
- Reign: c. 1480 BC
- Predecessor: ? Kaštiliašu III
- Successor: ? Agum III
- House: Kassite

Ulam-Buriaš, contemporarily inscribed as Ú-la-Bu-ra-ra-ia-aš (Note: Mace head VA Bab. 645 (BE 6405) with ten line possession inscription, in the Vorderasiatisches Museum Berlin.) or ^{m}Ú-lam-Bur-áš in a later chronicle (Note: Chronicle of Early Kings, tablets BM 26472 and BM 96152 in the British Museum.) and meaning “son of (the Kassite deity) Buriaš”, was a Kassite king of Sealand (cuneiform:LUGAL KUR A.AB.BA, Akkadian: šar māt tâmti), which he conquered during the second half of 16th century BC and may have also become king of Babylon, possibly preceding or succeeding his brother, Kaštiliašu III. His reign marks the point at which the Kassite kingdom extended to the whole of southern Mesopotamia.

== Biography ==
Confirmation of his provenance comes from an onyx weight, in the shape of a frog, with a cuneiform inscription, “1 shekel, Ulam Buriaš, son of Burna Buriaš”, which was found in a large burial, during excavations of the site of the ancient city of Metsamor. The burial for two, was accompanied by fifty sacrificial victims, nineteen horses, bulls, sheep and dogs. Situated in Armenia, in the middle of the Ararat valley, Metsamor was an important Hurrian center for metal forging.

The Chronicle of Early Kings, a neo-Babylonian historiographical text preserved on two tablets, describes how Ea-gamil, the last king of the Sealand Dynasty, fled to Elam ahead of an invasion force led by Ulam-Buriaš, the “brother of Kaštiliašu”, who became “master of the land” (bēlūt māti īpuš), i.e. Sealand, a region of southern Mesopotamia synonymous with or at the southern end of Sumer. A serpentine or diorite mace head or possibly door knob found in Babylon, is engraved with the epithet of Ulaburariaš, “King of Sealand”. The object was excavated at Tell Amran ibn-Ali, during the German excavations of Babylon, conducted from 1899 to 1912, and is now housed in the Pergamon Museum.
