= Enlil-nadin-ahi =

Enlil-nādin-aḫe
- King of Babylon
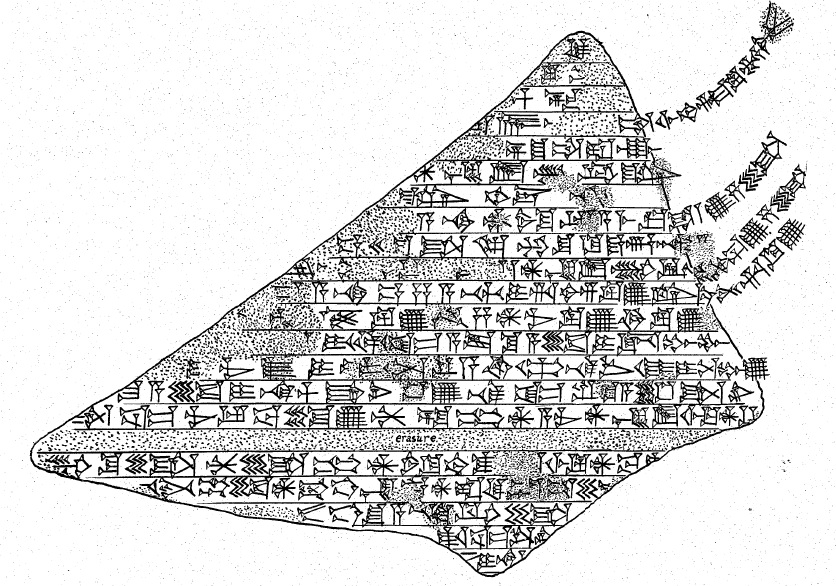
- Line art, cuneiform text, for BM 113891, a boundary stone recording a royal land grant dated to the reign of Enlil-nādin-aḫe (Note: Kudurru BM 113891 in the British Museum.)
- Reign: c. 1157—1155 BC
- Predecessor: Zababa-šuma-iddina
- Successor: Marduk-kabit-aḫḫēšu; 2nd Dynasty of Isin
- House: Kassite

Enlil-nādin-aḫe, (Note: Written contemporarily as ^{d}EN.LÍL-MU-ŠEŠ.) “Enlil gives a brother,” (Note: CAD a, aḫu, p. 195.) or Enlil-šuma-uṣur, “Enlil protect the son,” (Note: CAD s3, šumu, p. 295.) depending on the reading of –MU-ŠEŠ, ca. 1157—1155 BC, was the 36th and final king of the Kassite or 3rd dynasty that had ruled over Babylon and the land known as Karduniash since perhaps around 1500 BC.

== Biography ==
Shutruk-Nahhunte, king of Elam, had overrun Babylonia bringing Enlil-nādin-aḫe’s predecessor, Zababa-šuma-iddina’s brief rule to an end. He had then returned to Susa leaving his son, Kutir-Nahhunte, to govern. Enlil-nādin-aḫe was proclaimed king of “Sumer and Akkad”, and ruled for three years (Note: Kinglist A, BM 33332, column 2, line 15.) possibly in defiance of the occupying Elamite forces. A single kudurru, or boundary stone (pictured), detailing a royal land grant, an administrative text listing recipients of grain from Ur, (Note: Tablet Museum reference, IM 85538, excavation reference U 7789i, “Issues of Grain.”) and a couple of tablets from a small cache (Note: Tablets VAT 13230 and VAT 21995, although the latter lacks the last element of the name.) from the Merkes section of Babylon, all bear witness to his reign.

According to later chronicles, his short reign was brought to a dramatic close when he led a campaign against the Elamite forces and suffered a crushing defeat at the hands of Kutir-Nahhunte, who was possibly now the successor of Shutruk-Nahhunte. He was deported with the Kassite noblemen in chains to Susa accompanied by the booty pillaged from the various Babylonian temples, whose most notable example was the cult statue of Marduk, an act so sacrilegious to the Babylonians that it would forever cast Kutir-Nahhunte in infamy.

His crimes were greater and his grievous sins worse than all his fathers had committed. . .like a deluge he laid low all the peoples of Akkad, and cast in ruins Babylon and all the noblest cities of sanctity.

— Nabû-kudurrī-uṣur I? , Poetic pseudo-autobiographical text. (Note: Tablet K. 2660, pseudo-autobiography of Nabû-kudurrī-uṣur.)

The memory of the disaster was preserved in the Akkadian liturgy in a prayer, presenting rituals in the third month Simanu. An invocation for the god of justice, Šamaš, recounts:

An aggressor attacked us, plundered our flocks. A wicked enemy came quickly against us; the evil one laid waste our countryside. The foe captured us. His bow was nocked to let the arrows fly. But we ourselves, we did not know how to grasp a quiver. Elam overwhelmed our sacred localities. We did not know the great craft of war and the Subarian [was as] hostile to him as a ewe-lamb. Babylon, its loins have been stripped.

— Temple Ritual for Simanu, Babylonian temple rituals. (Note: Tablet BM 32656, column 3, lines 13 to 20.)

The so-called Chedor-laomer texts, from the Spartoli tablets collection in the British Museum, may make reference to this period, where Kutir-Nahhunte is represented by Kudur-lagamar. Kudur-lagamar is described as ruling in Babylon and overthrowing, or perhaps taking away Marduk. These are fragmentary second century BC texts, preserving traditions going back to perhaps the seventh century BC, relating how four successive kings, with cryptic ambiguous names, attacked Babylon.

The translation of "Chedorlaomer Tablets" from the Spartoli collection:

With their firm counsel, they established Kudur-Lagamar, king of Elam. Now, one who is pleasing to them [-] will exercise kingship in Babylon, the city of Babylonia (...) What king of Elam is there who provided for Esagila and ... ? The Babylonians ... and [-] their message: “(As for) [the wo]rds that you wrote: ‘I am a king, son of king, of [royal seed e]ternal, [indeed] the son of a king's daughter who sat upon the royal throne. [As for] Dur-ṣil-ilani son of Erie[A]ku, who [carried off] plunder of [-], he sat on the royal throne ... [-] [As for] us, let a king come whose [lineage is] firmly founded] from ancient days, he should be called lord of Babylon (...) When the guardian of well-being cries [-] The protective spirit of Esharra [-] was frightened away. The Elamite hastened to evil deeds, for the Lord devised evil for Babylon. When the protective genius of justice stood aside, the protective spirit of Esharra, temple of all the gods, was frightened away. The Elamite enemy took away his possessions, Enlil, who dwelt therein, became furious. When the heavens (?) changed their appearance, the fiery glare and ill wind obliterated their faces. Their gods were frightened off, they went down to the depths. Whirlwinds, ill wind engulfed the heavens. Anu (the gods') creator had become furious. He diminished their (celestial) appearances, he laid waste (?) his (own celestial) position, with the burning of the shrine E-ana he obliterated its designs. [-] Esharra, the netherworld trembled. [Enlil?] commanded total destruction. [The god had] become furious: he commanded for Sumer the smashing of En[lil]'s land. Which one is Kudur-Lagamar, the evil doer? He called therefore the Umman-man(da he level)led the land of Enlil, he laid waste (?) [-] at their side. When the [-] of Ê-zida, and Nabu, trustee of all [-] hastened to [-] He set [out] downstream, toward the ocean, Ibbi-Tutu, who was on the sea, hastened to the East, He (Nabu) crossed the sea and accupied a dwelling not his own. The rites of E-zida, the sure house, were deathly still. The Elamite [enemy] sent forth his chariotry, he headed dowstream toward Borsippa. He came down the dark way, he entered Borsippa. The vile Elamite toppled its sanctuary, he slew the nobles of ...with weapons, he plundered all the temples. He took their possessions and carried them off to Elam. He destroyed its wall, he filled the land [with weeping ...] (...) an improvident sovereign [-] he felled with weapons Dur-ṣil-ilani son of Eri-[e]Aku, he plundered [-] water over Babylon and Esagila, he slaughtered its [-] with his own weapon like sheep, [-] he burned with fire, old and young, [-] with weapons, [-] he cut down young and old. Tudḫula son of Gazza[-], plundered the [-] water over Babylon and Esagila, [-] his son smote his pate with his own weapon. [-] his lordship to the [rites] of Annunit[um] [king of] Elam [-] plundered the great ..., [-] he sent like the deluge, all the cult centers of Akkad and their sanctuaries he burned [with fi]re Kudur-Lagamar his son c[ut?] his middle and his heart with an iron dagger, [-] his enemy he took and sought out (?). The wicked kings, criminals, [-] captured. The king of the gods, Marduk, became angry at them (...) [The doer] of evil to him [-] his heart [-] the doer of sin must not [-]

The Marduk Prophecy, (Note: The Marduk Prophecy (Prophecy D, tablet K. 2158+.) a vaticinium ex eventu (prophecy after the fact) composition of perhaps the Nabu-kudurri-uṣur I-(Nebuchadnezzar I) reign, c. 1125 BC to 1103 BC, describes the dire consequences of the departure of the statue of Marduk, on the city of Babylon, where: “mad dogs roam the city biting citizens, friend attacks friend, the rich beg from the poor, brother eats brother, and the corpses block the city gates.”
