= Burnaburiash I =

Burna-Buriyåš I
- King of Babylon
- Reign: c. 1500 BC
- Predecessor: ? Agum II
- Successor: Kaštiliašu or Ulam Buriaš
- House: Kassite

Burna-Buriyåš I, (Note: For example, inscribed Bur-na-Bu-ra-ri-ia-aš in a votive inscription of Ula-Burariaš or restored as ^{m}[Bur-na-B] [ur]–[x-(y)-áš] in tablet A.117.) meaning servant of the Lord of the lands, was the first Kassite who really ruled over Babylonia, possibly the first to occupy the city of Babylon proper around 1500 BC, culminating a century of creeping encroachment by the Kassite tribes. He was the 10th king of this dynasty to be listed on the Assyrian Synchronistic Kinglist. (Note: A neo-Assyrian Synchronistic Kinglist, A.117, excavation reference Assur 14616c, in the Assur collection of the İstanbul Arkeoloji Műzeleri.)

^{m}[b]ur-na-bu-ra-ri-ia-aš is an old spelling as opposed to later burna-buriaš.

== Reign ==
At about 1500 BC, Burna-Buriyåš concluded a treaty with Puzur-Aššur III of Assyria (r. 1521–1498 BC), then a small vassal to the Mitanni, taking an oath (or itmûma) to delineate the border between their kingdoms. (Note: ^{m}Pu-zur-Aš-šur šar_{4} ^{kur}Aš-šur ù ^{m}Bur-na-bur-ia-áš šar_{4} ^{kur}Kar-du-ni-áš it-mu-ma mi-iṣ-ri ta-ḫu-mu an-na-ma ú-ki-nu.) The Synchronistic Chronicle (Note: Synchronistic Chronicle (ABC 21), tablet K4401a, column 1, lines 5 - 7.) places this episode after the treaty between Karaindaš and Assyrian king Aššur-bêl-nišešu, but there is no known Puzur-Aššur after him on any of the copies of the Assyrian Kinglist which led Röllig to conclude that a later scribe had confused Burna-Buriyåš with his name-sake, Burna-Buriaš II. The Synchronistic Kinglist names one Burna-Buriyåš as the 10th Kassite ruler and a contemporary of Išme-Dagan II, who is separated from Puzur-Aššur III by 42 regnal years. This might suggest that there were two early Burna-Buriyaš’, one contemporary with Puzur-Aššur III and one roughly contemporary with Išme-Dagan II, if this late Assyrian tablet were to be considered a reliable source in this respect. It does, however, take some significant liberties with chronology in other places. A fragmentary clay cone or cylinder (Note: Clay cone/cylinder UM 55-21-62 (2 NT 356)) apparently recording a land grant, recovered from excavation in Nippur during the 1949–50 season, may date to his reign based upon the reconstruction of his name on line 5 and the paleography of the cuneiform. If correctly identified, it would make this kudurru or narû ša ḫaṣbi, "memorial clay-stele", the oldest exemplar of this genre of public memorial.

== Succession ==
Burna-Buriyåš may have been succeeded by his son Kaštiliašu III, but the evidence supporting this son's kingship is rather circumstantial. He was also father of Ulam-Buriyåš, as commemorated on an onyx weight, in the shape of a frog, with a cuneiform inscription, "1 shekel, Ulam Buriaš, son of Burna Buriaš", which was found in a large burial, during excavations of the site of the ancient city of Metsamor site. It was this son who apparently led a successful invasion of the Sealand, a region of Southern Mesopotamia synonymous with Sumer, and made himself "master of the land". (Note: Chronicle of Early Kings (ABC 20) BM 96152, tablet B, reverse, lines 12 through 14.) Also, a serpentine or diorite mace head (Note: Blackish-green knob BE 6405.) or possibly door knob found in Babylon, is engraved with a votive inscription of Ulaburariaš, son of Burna-Buriaš, "King of Sealand".
