= Agum II =

- King of Babylon
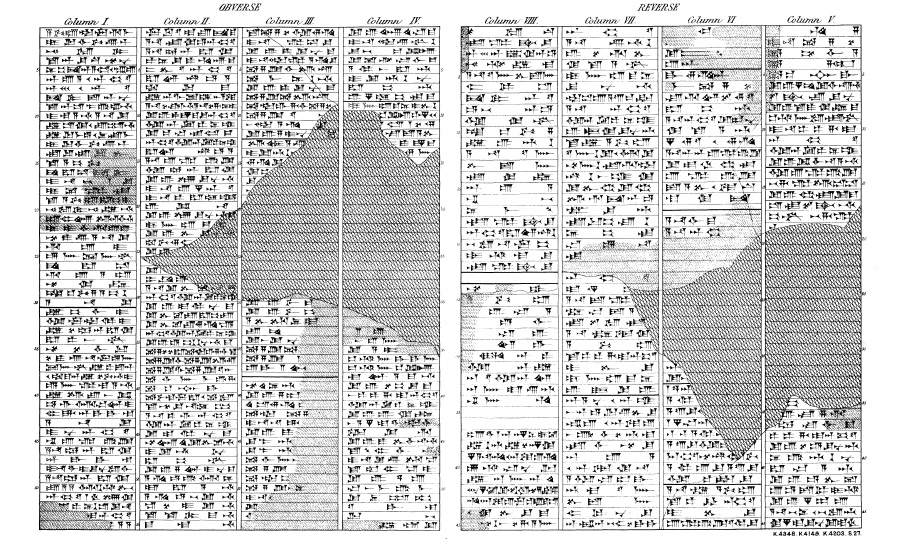
- Pinches's line art of the Agum Kakrime Inscription
- Reign: c. 1500 BC
- Predecessor: ? Šipta-Ulzi
- Successor: ? Burna-Buriyåš I
- House: Kassite

Agum II (Note: Inscribed a-gu-um-ka-ak-ri-me in his eponymous inscription, elsewhere unattested.) (also known as Agum Kakrime) was possibly a Kassite ruler who may have become the 8th or more likely the 9th king of the third Babylonian dynasty sometime after Babylonia was defeated and sacked by the Hittite king Mursilis I (Note: The Edict of Telepinu §9.) in 1595 BC (middle chronology), establishing the Kassite Dynasty which was to last in Babylon until 1155 BC. A later tradition, the Marduk Prophecy, (Note: The Marduk Prophesy, Tablet K.2158 in the British Museum.) gives 24 years after a statue was taken, before it returned of its own accord to Babylon, suggesting a Kassite occupation beginning around 1507 BC (short cronology).

The only historical source describes him as son of Urzigurumaš, (Note: Some commentators read this name as taš-ši-gu-ru-maš.) the 6th king of the dynasty, but the Synchronistic King List (Note: A neo-Assyrian Synchronistic King List A.117, tablet Ass. 14616c (KAV 216), in the Assur collection of the İstanbul Arkeoloji Műzeleri.) has two lacunae where the 8th and 9th kings precede Burna-Buriaš I, who was the 10th. The 7th position is occupied by a name containing “Ḫarba.” (Note: Variously restored as Ḫarba-Šipak, and Ḫurbazum.) It has been suggested that the 9th position may show traces of the name “Kakrime”, purported to mean Sword of Mercy or Weapon of Thunder.

== Agum-Kakrime Inscription ==
Everything that is known about him is through the Agum-Kakrime Inscription, an Akkadian text written in the neo-Assyrian cuneiform script but in very short lines in imitation of an antiquarian style. It is extant in two copies, (Note: Tablets K. (for Kouyunjik collection) 4149, 4203, 4348 and Sm. (for Smith collection) 27 in the British Museum.) (Note: Tablet Rm 505 in the Rassam siglum of tablets in the British Museum.) which describe the King's recovery of the cultic Statue of Marduk from the land of Ḫana (KUR ḫa-ni-i), pilfered by the Hittites during their sack of Babylon, and its restoration in the newly refurbished temple of Ésagila. In it, Agum portrays himself as the legitimate ruler and caring “shepherd” of both the Kassites and the Akkadians. He asserts his suzerainty over Padan and Alman and also the Guteans, “a foolish people,” (Note: UN.MEŠ saklāti; some translations say “a barbarous people” (saklu, CAD S p. 80).) groups variously located in regions of the Zagros mountains.

The inscription begins with an introduction, giving the King's name, genealogy, epithets and so on. He is a descendant of Abi[rattash], “the fierce hero.” It continues with a long narrative of the return of Marduk and his consort Zarpanītum and then lists Agum-Kakrime's many generous donations to the temple and includes descriptions of the purification of the house itself by a snake charmer and the construction of protective demons for the doorway.

Of uncertain provenance, it is on two tablets, one of which covers 8 columns and more than 350 lines, and including much esoteric detail concerning the temple and its rituals. One was found in the library of Ashurbanipal, purporting to be a copy of an inscription made in antiquity while the other was found elsewhere in Kouyunjik, ancient Nineveh. The Library of Ashurbanipal copy contains two colophons, and apart from the standard library identification, the earlier one reads mudû mudâ likallim, which has been translated as “Let the learned instruct the learned” or alternatively “The initiate may show the initiate.” For those disputing its authenticity, it is a later pseudonymous propaganda piece for the cult of Marduk, emphasizing certain tax exemptions granted for the restoration of the statues. Kassite era royal inscriptions are usually inscribed in Sumerian. Those supportive of its authenticity cite the iconography of the demons described on the door of the cella, which represent Marduk's defeated foes, (Note: “Venomous Snake” (Bašmu), “hairy one” (Laḫmu), “Bull-Man” (Kusarikku), “Big-Weather Beast” (Ugallu), “Mad Lion” (Uridimmu), “Fish-Man” (Kulullû) and “Carp-Goat” (suhurmašu)) the gods of cities conquered by Babylon, such as Ešnunna and are illustrative of a middle Babylonian theology. Marduk has yet to attain sovereignty over the universe characterized by the Enûma Eliš and the struggle with Tiāmat.

A more recent analysis tends to support the authenticity of the text and the existence of Agum II.

== Primary publications ==
- E. Norris (1866). The Cuneiform Inscriptions of Western Asia, vol. II: A Selection from the Miscellaneous Inscriptions of Assyria. pl. 38, no. 2 (line art), K.4149 misidentified as a tablet of Ashur-bani-pal; titles and prayers.
- T. G. Pinches (1909) [1880]. The Cuneiform Inscriptions of Western Asia, vol. V: A Selection from the Miscellaneous Inscriptions of Assyria and Babylonia. pl. 33 line art for tablets K.4149+4203+4348+Sm 27
- P. Jensen (1892). "Inschrift Agum-kakrimi's, d. i. Agum's des Jüngeren". Sammlung von assyrischen und babylonischen Texten in Umschrift und Übersetzung (KB III/1). pp. 134–153. full text.
- R. Campbell Thompson (1930). The Epic of Gilgamish. Text, Transliteration, and Notes. pl. 36 tablet Rm 505 (the duplicate copy).
- W. Sommerfeld (1982). Der Aufstieg Marduks: Die Stellung Marduks in der babylonischen Religion des zweiten Jahrtausands v. Chr. (AOAT 213). p. 172. no. 4.
- T. Longman (1991). Fictional Akkadian Autobiography: A Generic and Comparative Study. Eisenbrauns. pp. 79–88.
- P. Stein (2000). Die mittel- und neubabylonischen Königsinschriften bis zum Ende der Assyrerherrschaft: Grammatische Untersuchungen. pp. 150–165. full text.
- B. Foster (2005). Before the Muses: An Anthology of AkkadianLiterature. pp. 360–364. translation only.
- Takayoshi Oshima (2012). "Another Attempt at Two Kassite Royal Inscriptions: The Agum-Kakrime Inscription and the Inscription of Kurigalzu the Son of Kadashmanharbe". Babel und Bibel 6. Eisenbrauns. pp. 225–252, 258–261. transliteration, translation and photographs
