= Babylonian–Assyrian War of 1235 BCE =

13th-century BCE war between Babylon and Assyria

Date	c. 1235 BCE
Location	Babylonia and Assyria
Result	Assyrian victory

Belligerents
Babylonia	Assyria

Commanders and leaders
Kashtiliash IV (POW)	Tukulti-Ninurta I

The Babylonian–Assyrian War of 1235 BCE was a military conflict that took place around 1235 BCE. It was fought between Babylonia led by Kashtiliash IV and Assyria led by Tukulti-Ninurta I. The war ended with Assyrian victory.

== The conflict ==
According to his eponymous epic, Tukulti-Ninurta I, king of Assyria, was provoked into war by Kaštiliašu's dastardly preemptive attack on his territory, thereby breaching an earlier treaty between their ancestors Adad-nīrāri I and Kadašman-Turgu. But trouble may have been brewing for some time. Tudḫaliya, king of the Hittites, himself reeling from defeat by the Assyrians at the Battle of Nihriya, refers to the Babylonian king as his equal, in his treaty with his vassal, Šaušgamuwa of Amurru, hinting at the possible existence of an alliance or at least a tacit understanding between them. It reads:

The kings who are equal to me (are) the king of Egypt, the king of Karanduniya (Babylon), the king of Assyria <and the king of Aḫḫiyawa>.
And if the king of Karanduniya is My Majesty's friend, he shall also be your friend; but if he is My Majesty's enemy, he shall also be your enemy.
Since the king of Assyria is My Majesty's enemy he shall also be your enemy.
Your merchant shall not enter into Assyria and you shall not allow his merchant into your land. He shall not pass through your land.
But if he enters into your land, you should seize him and send him off to My Majesty.

— Treaty between Tudḫaliya and Šaušgamuwa, Tablet A, column IV, lines 1-18 edited

Also, Kaštiliašu had granted land and presumably asylum to a Hurrian, a fugitive from Assyria's vassal Ḫanigalbat, commemorated on the Tablet of Akaptaḫa. He also reconfirmed a large gift of land on a kudurru that had been provided to Uzub-Šiḫu or -Šipak by the Kassite king, Kurigalzu II (c. 1332-1308 BC) in grateful recognition of his service in an earlier war against Assyria.

Tukulti-Ninurta petitioned the god Šamaš before beginning his counteroffensive. Kaštiliašu was captured, single-handed by Tukulti-Ninurta according to his account, who “trod with my feet upon his lordly neck as though it were a footstool” and deported him ignominiously in chains to Assyria. The victorious Assyrian demolished the walls of Babylon, massacred many of the inhabitants, pillaged and plundered his way across the city to the Esagila temple, where he made off with the statue of Marduk. He then proclaimed himself “king of Karduniash, king of Sumer and Akkad, king of Sippar and Babylon, king of Tilmun and Meluhha.” Middle Assyrian texts recovered at modern Tell Sheikh Hamad, ancient Dūr-Katlimmu, which was the regional capital of the vassal Ḫanigalbat, include a letter from Tukulti-Ninurta to his grand vizier, Aššur-iddin advising him of the approach of Šulman-mušabši escorting a Babylonian king, who may have been Kaštiliašu, his wife, and his retinue which incorporated a large number of women, on his way to exile after his defeat. The journey to Dūr-Katlimmu seems to have traveled via Jezireh.

The conflict, and its outcome, is recorded in the Tukulti-Ninurta Epic, a poetic “victory song”, which has been recovered in several lengthy fragments, somewhat reminiscent of the earlier account of Adad-nīrāri's victory over Nazi-Maruttaš. It would lend its form to later Assyrian epics such as that of Shalmaneser III, concerning his campaign in Ararat. Written strictly from the Assyrian point of view, it provides a strongly biased narrative. Tukulti-Ninurta is portrayed as an innocent victim of the invidious Kaštiliašu, who is contrasted as “the transgressor of an oath”, and who has so vexed the gods that they have abandoned their sanctuaries.

More succinct accounts of these events are also inscribed on five large limestone tablets which were imbedded in Tukulti-Ninurta's construction projects as foundation stones, for example the Annals of Tukulti-Ninurta, carved on a slab which was buried in or under the wall of his purpose-built capital, Kar-Tukulti-Ninurta.
