= Karaindash =

King of Babylon
- Reign: c. 1440 – c. 1405 BC
- Died: c. 1405 BC

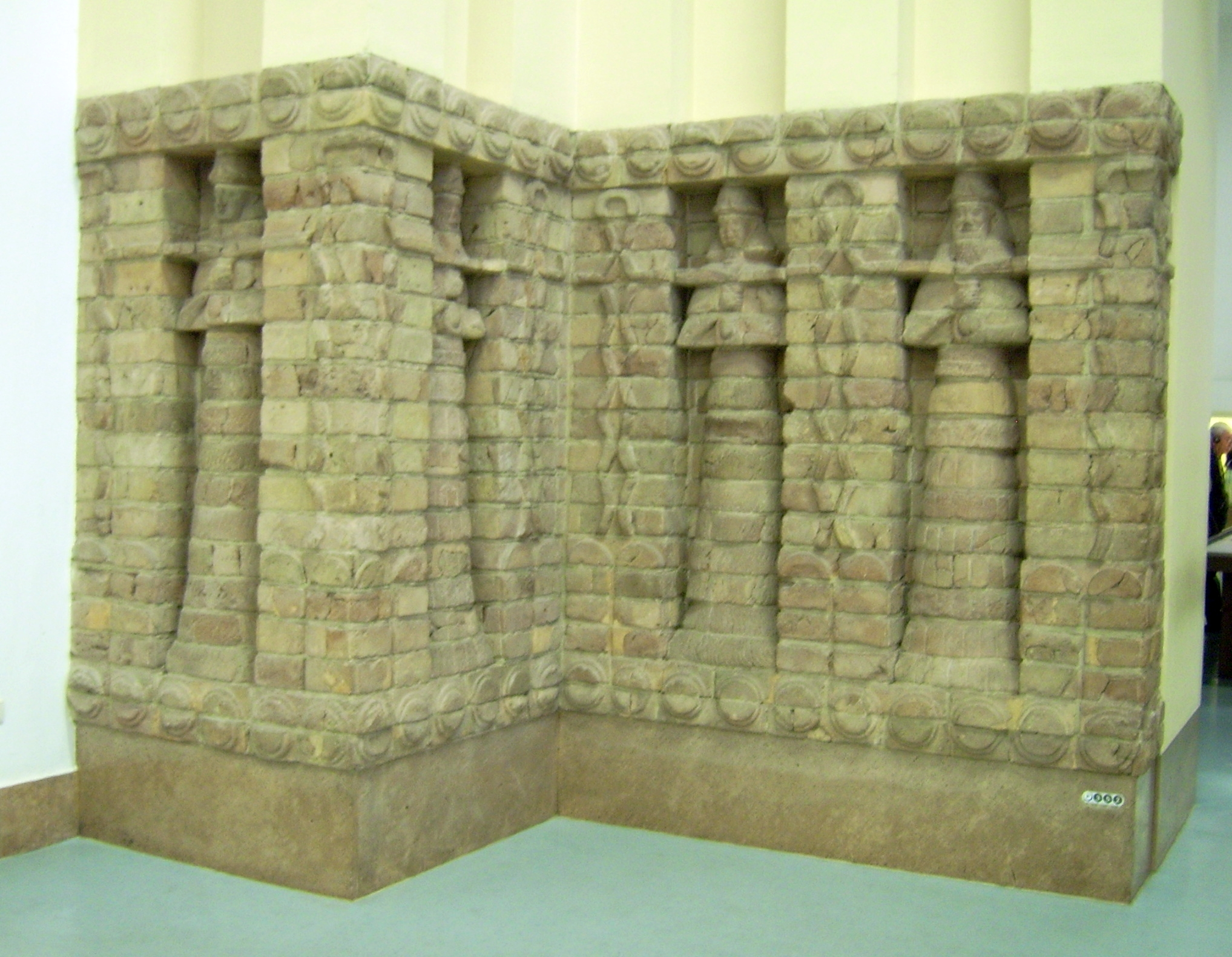
Molded baked-brick bas-relief of the temple of Karaindash from Uruk

Karaindaš (died c. 1405 BC) was one of the more prominent rulers of the Kassite dynasty and reigned towards the end of the 15th century BC. An inscription on a tablet detailing building work calls him “Mighty King, King of Babylonia, King of Sumer and Akkad, King of the Kassites, King of Karduniaš,” (Note: Tablet A 3519, in the collection of the Oriental Institute, University of Chicago, CDLI, a late Babylonian copy of a monumental inscription.) inscribed ka-ru-du-ni-ia-aš, probably the Kassite language designation for their kingdom and the earliest extant attestation of this name.

== Eanna of Inanna ==
Karaindash’s own 11-line Sumerian inscriptions (Note: For example BM 90287, 11-line brick inscription in the British Museum, CDLI.) adorn bricks from the Temple dedicated to the goddess Inanna, in Uruk, where he commissioned the spectacular façade pictured. It is 2.05 meters high and would originally have been constructed from around 500 pre-formed baked bricks, which were set in recessed socles, depicting both male and female deities holding water jugs. The bearded males wear horned flat caps and double streams of water flow symmetrically to frame the niches. Apart from the simple dedication, there are no significant texts adorning the façades.

The temple to Inanna was originally located in a courtyard of the Eanna, or “House of Heaven”, precinct of Uruk and stood until the Seleucid era. It was a rectangular building with a long cella and ante-cella surrounded by corridors and the elaborately decorated external wall with corner bulwarks. The inner sanctuary had the cult image at the end, instead of the usual siting in the middle of a long wall.

It was excavated during the 1928-1929 season by a team led by Director Julius Jordan under the auspices of the Deutsche Orient Gesellschaft and Deutsche Not-Gemeinschaft. A section of the outer wall has been reassembled and moved to the Vorderasiatisches wing of the Pergamon Museum in Berlin. Parts of the façade were in the Iraq Museum in Baghdad, but were stolen during the looting of the museum after the American occupation of Baghdad during the second Gulf War and have since disappeared.

== Diplomatic relations ==
He concluded a boundary treaty (riksu) with Ashur-bel-nisheshu of Assyria (1407-1399; short chronology), “together with an oath (māmītu)” according to the Synchronistic Chronicle. (Note: "Synchronistic Chronicle" (ABC 21), tablet A, K4401a, lines 1 through 4.)

According to Sassmannshausen, it is very likely that Karaindash was the Babylonian king who sent precious gifts, including lapis lazuli, to pharaoh Thutmose III during his 8th campaign, the attack on Mitanni, according to the Annals of Thutmose III. This was conducted in the 33rd of his reign or around 1447 BC according to the Low Chronology of Ancient Egypt, suggesting Karaindash had a very long reign if this chronology coincides with that of the short chronology used for the Near East, but there are chronological difficulties trying to correlate Thutmose III and Karaindash.

Burna-Buriash II, in his Amarna correspondence with Pharaoh Akhenaten, in the tablet designated EA 10, (Note: El Amarna tablet EA 10 (BM 029786, in the British Museum), CDLI, ORACC Transliteration lines 8 to 10.) describes him as the first to enter into friendly relations with Egypt, “Since the time of Karaindaš, since messengers of your ancestors have come regularly to my ancestors, up to the present they (the ancestors of the two lands) have been good friends.” The Annals of Tuthmosis, inscribed on the inside walls of the corridor which surrounds the granite holy of holies of the Great Temple of Amun at Karnak, record the tribute of Babylon, and include a lapis lazuli ram's head amongst the inventory.

== Other sources ==
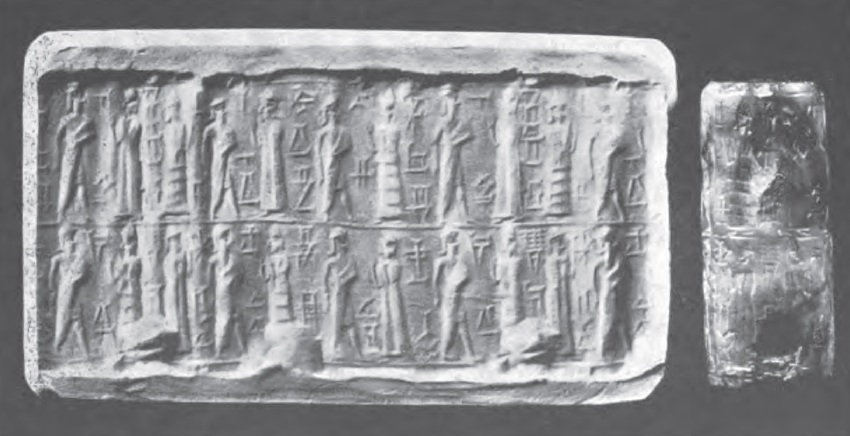
Seal of Izkur-Marduk (University Museum, Philadelphia)

A brown agate cylinder seal (pictured), which is in the University Museum in Philadelphia, is inscribed “Oh [Shuqamuna], lord who advances in brilliance by your fullness … your light is indeed favourable: Izkur-Marduk, son of Karaindaš, who prays to you and reveres you.” (Note: CBS 1108 brown agate seal bearing 7 line Sumerian inscription, University Museum, Philadelphia.) Shuqamuna was a Kassite male god symbolized by a bird on a perch often accompanied by his consort, Shumaliya, associated with the investiture of kings. Izkur-Marduk's name is wholly Babylonian and translates as “he has invoked Marduk”.

His renown was apparently so great, that Shutruk-Nakhunte who would go on to ransack Babylon around 250 years later, boasted “I destroyed Karaindaš”, i.e. Babylon.
