= Kudur-Enlil =

- King of Babylon
- Reign: 9 regnal years c. 1254–1246 BC
- Predecessor: Kadašman-Enlil II
- Successor: Šagarakti-Šuriaš
- House: Kassite

Kudur-Enlil, rendered in cuneiform as Ku-dur ^{d}EN.LÍL (c. 1254–1246 BC), "son of Enlil," was the 26th king of the 3rd or Kassite dynasty of Babylon. He reigned into his ninth year, as attested in contemporary economic tablets. His relationship with his predecessor and successor is uncertain and does not appear in contemporary inscriptions. The personal name "Marduk is king of the gods" first appears during his reign marking the deity"s ascendancy to the head of the pantheon.

== Biography ==
He succeeded Kadašman-Enlil II and was possibly the first Kassite king to have a wholly Babylonian name, or one containing an Elamite derived word, from kudurru, which might be middle Assyrian. Although the Babylonian King List A records him as son of Kadašman-Enlil, (Note: Babylonian King List A, BM 33332, ii 5: a broken and badly worn tablet in the British Museum, also errs with respect to the length of his reign, 6 years rather than 9 proven by economic texts, after Brinkman MSKH I p. 430.) it is a late source and no contemporary inscriptions exist which support this contention. It has been suggested that he may in fact have been the brother of Kadašman-Enlil, as his predecessor ascended the throne as a child and ruled perhaps nine years.

A daughter of Babylon was married into the Hittite royal family, possibly to Tudhaliya IV, a younger son of Ḫattušili III who went on to succeed him. This would have been a daughter or sister of Kudur-Enlil and the news elicited contempt from Ramesses II, king of Egypt, who apparently no longer regarded Babylon significant. Pudu-Ḫepa, the Hittite queen, replied in a letter, (Note: KUB 21.38: letter from Pudu-Ḫepa.) "If you say "the king of Babylon is not a Great King", then you do not know the status of Babylon".

A large inscribed stone, of unusual provenance, was photographed and then lost in Kermānšāh province Iran. It read "One talent, correct (weight), of Rabâ-ša-Adad, ša rēši (official) of Šagarakti-Šuriaš, son of Ku⸣dur-Enlil, king of the world". This would indicate that paternity of this ruler.

=== Nippur renaissance ===
Nippur experienced explosive growth under Kudur-Enlil and his successor, with the city expanding almost to its Ur III extent. Kudur-Enlil extensively refurbished the Enlil Temple in Nippur, with its baked-brick bench or socle lining the base of all except the northeast outer walls. The later period of construction is witnessed by his stamped brick inscriptions (Note: Stamped bricks IM 56097 and IM 61767 in the National Museum of Iraq and more than forty others.) which describe him as a benefactor of the temple. A brick of Kudur-Enlil bearing a twelve-line Sumerian inscription which was found inside the temple states that he built the supporting wall with bitumen and baked bricks. (Note: 5 NT 700, now in the Iraq Museum.) It was customary for the king to travel to Nippur at the 'beginning of the year' for the Akitu spring festival and there is an example of a record of the 'return of the crown prince' in the third year of Kudur-Enlil.

His name appears on various votive and civic monument inscriptions, as well as on numerous economic texts, such as a legal text about the escape and capture of a slave and a note of payment for mat-makers. (Note: Tablets BM 17626 and BM 17710.) The extent to which the number of texts extant reflects the degree of economic activity is disputed, possibly more due to fortuitous discovery of archives, however, more than 270 have been recovered, 70 recently published from an archive from Dūr-Enlilē, dated for a reign of only nine years.

=== Other Babylonian centers ===
Excavations at `Aqar-Qūf, ancient Dūr-Kurigalzu revealed in level II inscriptions of the time of Kudur-Enlil and the later king Kaštiliašu IV, showing that this city continued to be occupied by Kassite kings long after its foundation by Kurigalzu I. There are one or two administrative records amongst a cache of 64 from the palace dated to him. A private archive from Babylon of seven clay tablets in a pot includes legal texts dated to his reign.

A Kudurru stone, (Note: Kudurru L. 7076 land grant and tax exemptions.) found at Larsa, recorded a land grant and tax exemptions, or zakûtu.
