= Kadashman-Harbe II =

Kadašman-Ḫarbe II
- King of Babylon
- Reign: c. 1223 BC
- Predecessor: Enlil-nādin-šumi
- Successor: Adad-šuma-iddina
- House: Kassite

Kadašman-Ḫarbe II, inscribed ^{d}Ka-dáš-man-Ḫar-be, Kad-aš-man-Ḫar-be or variants and meaning I believe in Ḫarbe, the lord of the Kassite pantheon corresponding to Enlil, succeeded Enlil-nādin-šumi, as the 30th Kassite or 3rd dynasty king of Babylon. His reign was recorded as lasting only one year, six months, c. 1223 BC, as "MU 1 ITI 6" according to the Kinglist A, (Note: Kinglist A, BM 33332, ii 9.) a formula which is open to interpretation.

== Biography ==
He seems to have been elevated to the kingship following the downfall of Enlil-nādin-šumi after the invasion of Elamite forces under their king, Kidin-Hutran III. He may have ruled during the Assyrian hegemony of Tukulti-Ninurta I or possibly in the period between the capture of the earlier Kassite monarch, Kaštiliašu IV, and the second Assyrian campaign which conquered the city of Babylon. There is little known about the reign other than it was short, perhaps just a few months.

Despite the apparent brevity of his reign, there are six economic texts (clay tablets) dated to him. The two economic texts from Ur include a judgment of a case (Note: Museum ref. IM 85473, excavation ref. U 7788d, settlement of a dispute arising from purchase of a slave, Gurney text 2, Brinkman K^{b}.2.2.2., month of Ṭebētu, day 28, accession year.) involving the aborted purchase of a boy called Bunni-Sîn and the aggressive steps his would-be buyer (Šamaš-ēṭir) took to seek return of his fee, including imprisoning the wife (Rihītuša) of the acting surety (Irība-ili). The other Ur text (Note: Museum ref. IM 85505, excavation ref. U 7787i, purchase of a cow with calf, Gurney text 34, Brinkman K^{b}.2.2.4., month of Abu, day 9, year 1(?).) is dated seven months later and is a purchase contract for a cow with calf, where Šamaš-ēṭir once again acts as buyer. There are two texts from Nippur dated to his reign, one of which (Note: Museum ref. CBS 12917, legal text for purchase of a wife, Brinkman K^{b}.2.2.1., month of Kislīmu, day 11, year accession year.) records the sale of a girl, one-half cubit in size, to Rabâ-ša-Ninimma, as a wife for his second son, Ninimma-zēra-šubši, for the price of two fine muḫtillû-garments, worth two shekels of gold, and some food. The other text is a ration list (Note: Museum ref. CBS 7241, month of Kislīmu, accession year.) and is the earliest of the dated clay tablets.

The other texts, one of unknown origin (Note: Museum ref. YBC 7652, dated month of Elūlu day 14, first year .) and one apparently from Babylon (Note: Bab 39045, dated month Ṭebētu day 10 tenth year.) remain unpublished. This second text would have presented a chronological problem as it could be dated Ṭebētu, 10th day tenth year if the Winkelhaken has been correctly read. It was recovered from the archive of Itti-Ezida-lummir in Babylon (Pedersén M8) along with another tablet of unconventional dating, (Note: A. 1998 (= Bab 39031), a tablet with a Kadašman-Enlil immediately preceding the reign of Kadašman-Turgu.) leading Werner Nahm to suggest them both ancient fabrications. However, it is written in the heavily slanted paleography of late Middle Babylonian cuneiform and should probably read as 1 in contrast to the 10 date on the preceding line. The other five texts fall within a twelve-month period. Also, another tablet from Nippur (Note: Museum ref. IM 80114, excavation ref. 14 N 211, dated month of Simānu, day 15, first year.) mentions him probably in the context of an earlier transaction in his accession year: [M]U.SAG.˹NA˺[M.L]UGAL-rí ˹^{d}˺ka-dáš-m[an-ḫar-b]e, but the date for the document omits a king's name.
