= Laguda =

Mesopotamian god

- God of the Persian Gulf
- Major cult center: Nēmed-Laguda

Laguda (^{d}la-gu-da, rarely ^{d}la-gù-dé) was a Mesopotamian god associated with the Persian Gulf.

== Character ==
It is assumed that Laguda was associated with the sea, specifically with the Persian Gulf. According to Wilfred G. Lambert, this interpretation of his character is supported by his frequent association with other marine deities. For instance, Sirsir, a god mentioned alongside him in Marduk's Address to the Demons, was associated with sailors, and it has been proposed that he can be identified as the so-called "boat god" on cylinder seals. Laguda is also referenced in the incantation series Šurpu, where he is listed alongside the river god Lugalidda and the sea god Lugala'abba.

The currently unpublished god list Anšar = Anum refers to Laguda as a name of Marduk, and associates him with Dilmun. It is possible that he also appears in an enumeration of Marduk's names in another list. However, the text Marduk's Address to the Demons attests that they were originally separate deities:

I am Asallulḫi whom Sirsir nominates in the upper sea, I am Asallulḫi whom Laguda exalts in the lower sea

== Worship ==
Laguda's cult center was most likely the city Nēmed-Laguda, known from sources from the first millennium BCE. Its precise location is not known, but based on mentions in ancient texts it can be assumed that it was close to cities such as Eridu, Larsa, Uruk and Ur. It was also associated with Ea according to a neo-Babylonian royal letter. At one point, gods of Nēmed-Laguda were returned by Sargon II.

Laguda is also attested in two theophoric names from Nippur from the earlier Kassite period, Tukulti-Laguda and Burra-Laguda. The element burra- in the latter name is Kassite, making Laguda one of the deities who appear in Kassite theophoric names despite belonging to the Mesopotamian, rather than Kassite, pantheon. His name was in this case written with a so-called "divine determinative" (dingir), a cuneiform sign preceding theonyms, unlike the names of any Kassite deities other than Shuqamuna and Shumaliya.
