= Nantucket series =

Alternate history trilogy written by S. M. Stirling

- Island in the Sea of Time (1998); Against the Tide of Years (1999); On the Oceans of Eternity (2000)
- Author: S.M. Stirling
- Country: United States
- Language: English
- Genre: Alternate history
- Publisher: Roc Books
- Published: February 1998 – April 2000
- Media type: Print (hardback & paperback)
- No. of books: 3
- Preceded by: The Domination
- Followed by: The Emberverse series

The Nantucket series (also known as the Nantucket trilogy or the Islander trilogy) is a set of alternate history novels written by S. M. Stirling.

The novels focus on the island of Nantucket in Massachusetts which was transported back in time to 1250 BC due to something called "The Event". Shortly thereafter a conflict develops between the democratic Republic of Nantucket and a group of renegade Americans led by the ex–Coast Guard lieutenant William Walker (based on the filibuster of the same name). The series was nominated for the Sidewise Award for Alternate History in 2000. The series is closely related to Stirling's Emberverse with "The Change" being the synonymous point of departure.

== Novels ==
| Book # | Title | UK release | US/CAN release |
|---|---|---|---|
| 1 | Island in the Sea of Time | March 1, 1998 | February 1, 1998 |
At 9:15 pm EST, March 17, 1998, the island of Nantucket is transported back in time to 1250 BC by the mysterious "Event". As the inhabitants work to create a new civilization, a group of renegades leaves to build an empire.
| 2 | Against the Tide of Years | May 1, 1999 | May 1, 1999 |
Ten years after the Event, the citizens of the Republic of Nantucket are more interested in trade and exploration than in bringing the renegade Walker to justice. This situation changes after Tartessos launches a sneak attack on Nantucket.
| 3 | On the Oceans of Eternity | April 29, 2000 | April 10, 2000 |
After making an alliance with Babylon, Hatti, and Mitanni, the Republic of Nantucket is ready to defeat Walker (who now controls Mycenean Greece) and his allies.

=== Short stories ===
- Riding Shotgun to Armageddon - Originally published in the anthology Armageddon in 1998 and later republished as a part of On the Oceans of Eternity in 2000. It was again published in 2007 in the anthology Ice, Iron, and Gold.
- Blood Wolf - Published on May 1, 2004, in The First Heroes anthology.

== Background ==
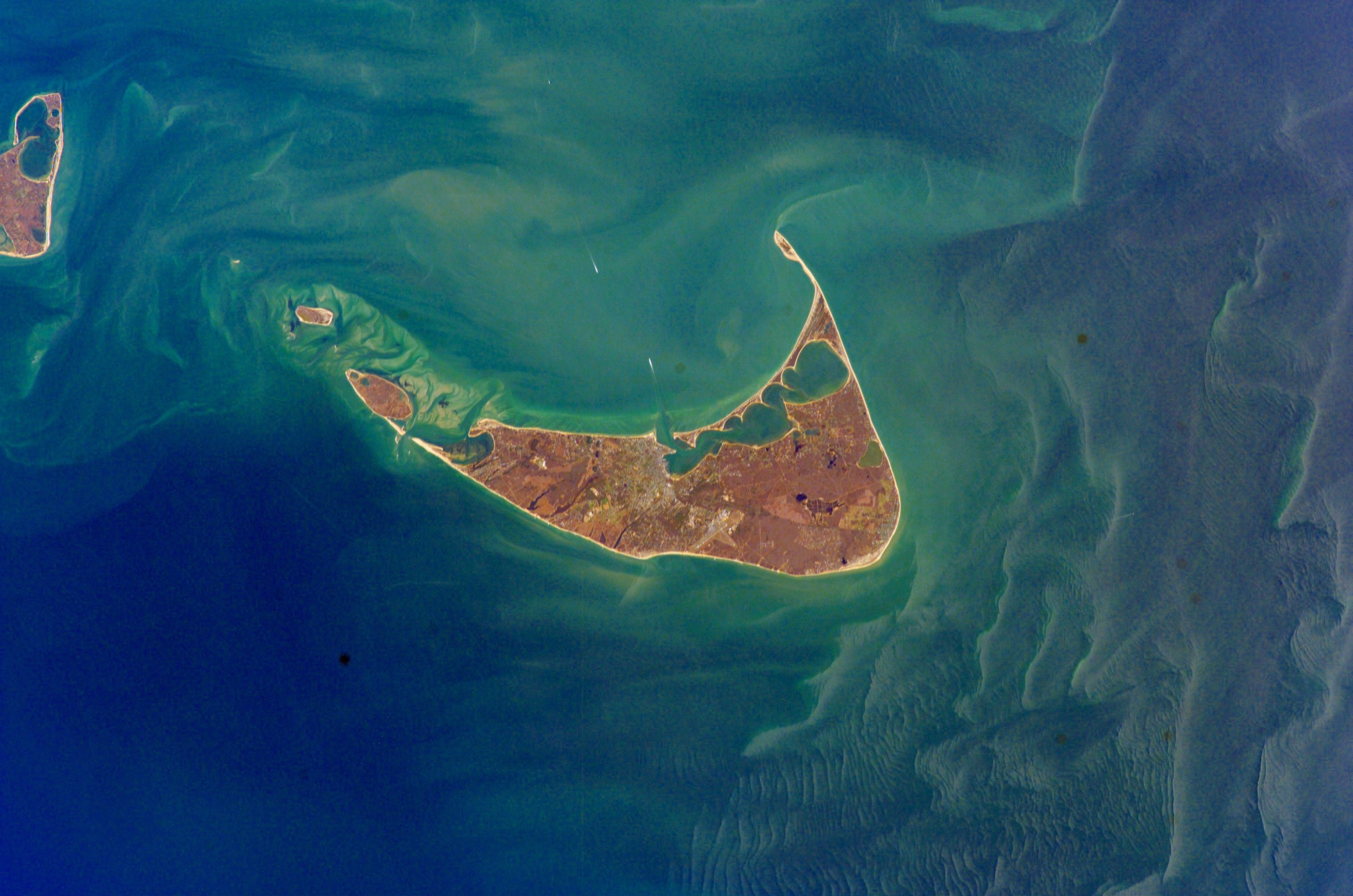
Nantucket Island

The Nantucket series is a variant on a well-known theme in time travel literature, in which a modern person is hurled back into the past and is able to introduce modern technologies, inventions and institutions, and completely change the past society. The theme goes back to Mark Twain's A Connecticut Yankee in King Arthur's Court and continued in many later works such as L. Sprague de Camp's classic Lest Darkness Fall. Poul Anderson disputed the plausibility of such scenarios in his "The Man Who Came Early", in which a man marooned in the past finds that – however capable and skilled in modern-day engineering – it is not possible for one person to introduce modern technologies all by himself, since he would not have "the tools to make the tools to make the tools". The Nantucket series gets around this difficulty by having not a single isolated person hurled into the past, but a whole island, with several thousand people of various backgrounds and skills, and in possession of a considerable amount of the physical and written resources of modern civilization – making their success much more plausible. Eric Flint used a similar literary device in his 1632 series.

== Premise ==
In the three novels of the Nantucket series, a cosmic disturbance characterized by an elliptical dome of fire (called "The Event" in the series) transports the island of Nantucket and its inhabitants back in time into the Bronze Age. The world of circa 1250 BC, which corresponds to the late Heroic Age of Greek mythology, is populated by a large variety of hunting, nomadic and agricultural people, as well as well-documented Bronze Age cultures including Ancient Egypt, the Hittites, and Mycenaean Greece.

The trilogy describes the day-to-day problems of adaptation and survival and the emotional and social trauma of losing connection with the modern world. Much of the plot deals with ongoing conflicts between the different factions of the island's population. Some Nantucket residents wish to dominate the world for their own benefit, others wish to interact with local populations through trade and cultural development, while most just want to survive, work hard, and claw their way back to something approaching their pre-Event way of life.

They have, transported in time together with the island, the US Coast Guard barque Eagle, captained by a Coast Guard captain, who provides leadership for Nantucket's armed forces. (She insists upon using the term "Coast Guard" rather than "Navy", though what she eventually builds up is a worldwide naval force.)

However, the ambitious and totally unscrupulous young lieutenant William Walker is also transported back with the ship. He seizes the opportunity to form a band of renegades, and flees the island with the ultimate goal to found a dynasty amongst the Bronze Age peoples of Europe and the Middle East. Walker—who, unfortunately, is as smart as he is callous—exploits the 'magic' of gunpowder and iron-forging to build up an empire of his own, one that he believes will inevitably conquer and enslave the entire world.

Therefore, as the series progresses, it becomes clear to Nantucket's scaled-down Government that sitting back and reinventing isolationism is no real option, and that the people of Nantucket have no choice but build an army, a navy, and a set of foreign alliances of their own and take the fight to Walker – and in the process, build up what amounts to an empire of their own.

By the end of the third book, Nantucket is the dominant member of a sizable and expanding network of allies, rather reminiscent of the British Empire (though Britain itself is called "Alba" in the novel, one of Nantucket's protectorates and a source of "warrior tribes" to be enrolled as mercenaries in its armies), and the Nantucketers ("Eagle-People", "Islanders", "Nan-Tukh-Tar", etc.) seem well on their way to re-enacting the United States’ Manifest Destiny three thousand years early, with Native Americans succumbing to disease and becoming virtually extinct on Long Island and the Nantuckers setting out on transcontinental expeditions and reaching California by sea, as well as starting to settle what corresponds to Argentina.

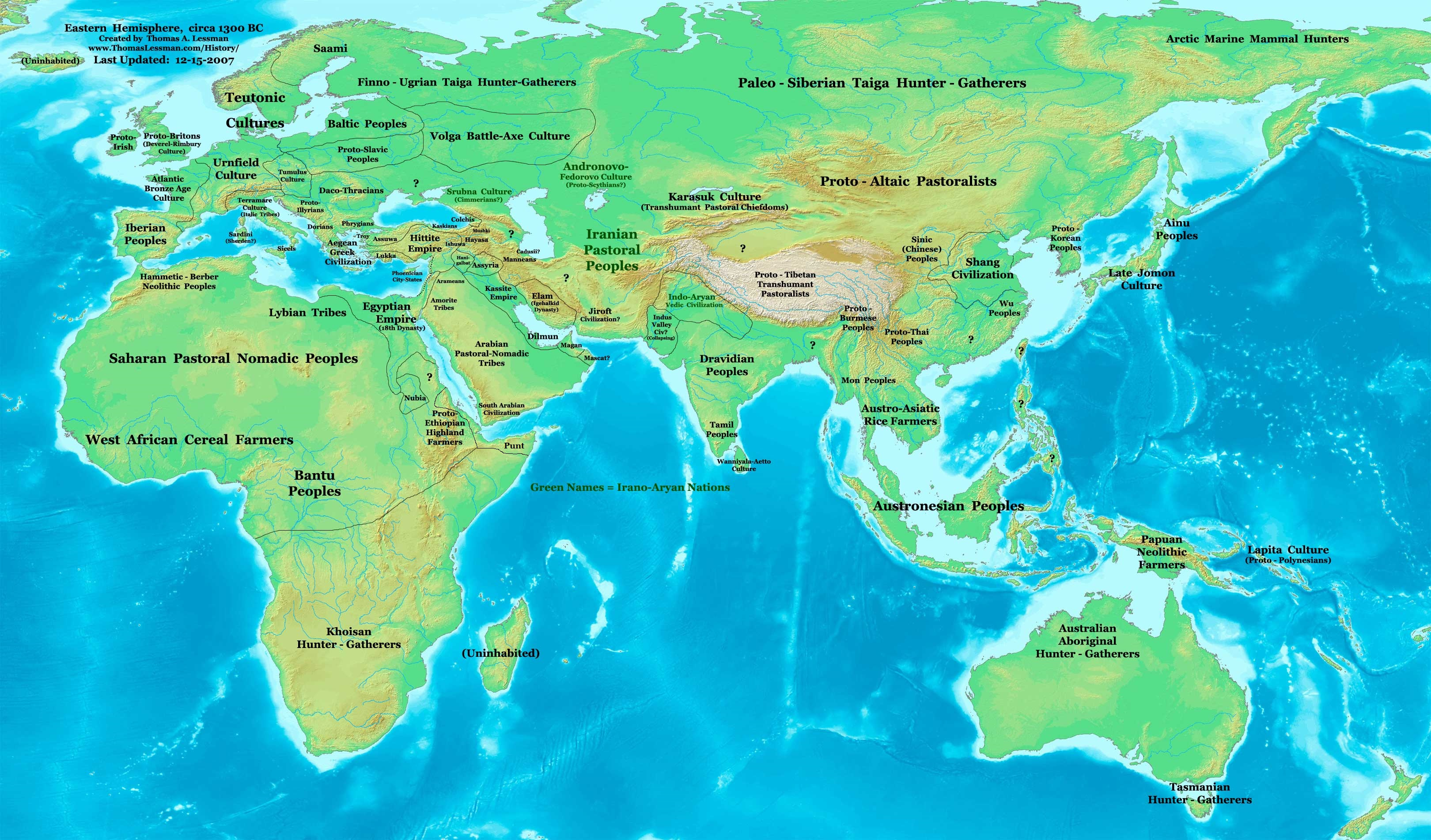
The Old World near the time Nantucket arrived

Nantucket has 'Outport' colonies spanning the globe, with bases in the Caribbean, Argentina, the Azores, South Africa, Zanzibar, Madagascar, Mauritius, Bombay, etc.; basically, anywhere there is a good harbor situated close to existing or future trading routes, the Republic is on the scene. The Alban Alliance rules the British Isles where Walker initially tried to carve out a kingdom, and are a close ally, a source of labor and military recruits, and, as its people absorb more of the New Learning, look like being at the heart of a very early Industrial Revolution. Babylon, Hittite Empire and Mitanni (a vassal of Babylon), are also allies. At the end of the third book, these allies are already laying plans for carving up the Caucasus and Persia between them.

=== Major powers ===
- Greater Achaea (Greece), which was the location of Walker's second—and much more successful—attempt at empire-building, but which is now ruled by King Odikweos.
- Tartessos, an Iberian city-state which gained greatly from its new King's decade-long alliance with Walker's Meizon Achaea, and which managed to survive its unsuccessful challenge to Nantucket for control of the sea. With a highly capable - and quite ruthless - ruler, who had spent some time on Nantucket and learned much, Tartessos is determined to industrialize and build its own world-wide naval empire, and its agents have already gotten as far as California.

=== Minor powers ===
- Shang dynasty, it is mentioned that ships from the Kingdom of Tartessos and the Republic of Nantucket have reached the Chinese coast and exchanged gifts with them.
- Babylon, a close ally of Nantucket, undergoing fast technological, social and cultural changes. The alliance started with Nantucket crushing Babylon's arch-enemy Assyria - which had been on the verge of conquering and subjugating Babylon. The alliance eventually ripened to the Babylonian King gaining an American queen at his side, who doubles as Commander of the Babylonian Army, and an American doctor married to a Babylonian healer founding the University of Babylon.
- Egypt, gained some basic New Learning from one of Walker's lieutenants, a fanatical — and naïve — Afrocentrist who was shocked to discover that the "Black Egyptians" were not truly black. After Egypt's defeat at the 'Battle of Armageddon' and the loss of its Canaan territory to Babylon, this lieutenant fled to Meroe, an iron-rich region in east-central Africa, with the intention of giving the black population a leg up before armed whites started arriving in large numbers. Egypt itself still remains out of Nantucket's system of alliances, but some of Pharaoh's officers are being suborned.
- The Sicilian Republic was formerly an Achaean colony, but, after having been invaded by Nantucket, is now an independent nation. Its government is currently divided between the Sicilian natives, freed slaves, and Achaean colonists.
- Alba, the Bronze Age Britain, is an ally of Nantucket after the Islanders defeated Walker and his Sun People allies there.
- As the third (and final) novel ends, in Central Asia, Walker's lone surviving heir — a young but highly intelligent and capable daughter — with a collection of mostly Achaean followers, have elected to emigrate to the Fergana Valley region, far, far away from the reach of Islander naval power.

== Significant characters ==
- Agamemnon: King of Mycenae and titular 'High King' of Bronze-Age Achaea. He welcomes William Walker and his 'magics' in 2AE, but is slow to realise that Walker is taking over his kingdom. Rather than continue as Walker's puppet, he commits suicide during an escape attempt.
- Marian Alston (later: Alston-Kurlelo): Captain in the U.S. Coast Guard and commander of the Coast Guard training ship Eagle, later military leader and Commodore of the Republic of Nantucket.
- Lucy Alston-Kurlelo: Marian and Swindapa's adopted daughter. Biological child of McAndrews and a Fiernan woman. Found in Walkerburg.
- Heather Alston-Kurlelo: Marian and Swindapa's adopted daughter. Fiernan orphan of unknown parentage.
- Ian Arnstein: Professor in classical history at University of San Diego, he has some knowledge of ancient languages.
- Jared Cofflin: A Nantucket local and chief of police on the island prior to the Event. A Vietnam veteran, Cofflin served as gunner on a gunboat in the Mekong Delta, receiving the Purple Heart at least once after being injured in a mortar attack. Following the Event, he is elected the first leader of the Republic of Nantucket by default. In addition to his function as head of state, he also put in time as a harpooner on a whaling ship. He marries the chief librarian Martha Stoddard.
- Pete Giernas: Nantucket Ranger of Lithuanian descent. Leader of the expedition to traverse the North American continent in 11 AE, which concluded with him leading an uprising against the secret Tartessian base he discovered in California.
- Kenneth Hollard: Nantucket teenager who joins the Expeditionary Force to Alba in the first novel and stays in the Republic's fledgling military, eventually being selected to lead the Nantucket mission to Babylonia and command the allied armies in the war against Walker's Greater Achaea. Falls in love with and marries Raupasha.
- Kathryn Hollard: Twin sister of Kenneth Hollard, also a veteran of the Alban Expeditionary Force and career military. Second-in-command of the mission to Babylonia, where she meets, falls in love with, and marries King Kashtiliash. According to the terms of their marriage contract, she will be his only queen and commander of the armies of Babylon, and their children will be raised for half of the year on Nantucket.
- Alice Hong: An Asian-American physician. Hong has a sado-masochistic fetish; according to her own self-diagnosis she is a clinical sadist, suffering from paranoid tendencies, borderline sociopath and possible antisocial elements. At first believing that Walker only jokes about becoming world emperor, she is quick to side with him and later becomes his first wife. She is later known as the Despotnia Algeos, the Lady of Pain or Avatar of Hekate. She creates an all-female military elite, resembling ninjas, known as the Claws of Hekate, to whom she is known as the Goddess-on-Earth.
- Isketerol: A Tartessian merchant, early associate of Walker and later King of Tartessos.
- Kashtiliash: King of Babylon, Son of Shagarakti-Shuriash; husband of Kathryn Hollard.
- Swindapa Kurlelo (later: Kurlelo-Alston): A young woman from southern Britain. She is of the Star Blood line of Kurlelo, of the Fiernan Bohulugi (People of the Soil or Earth Folk), with knowledge of her tribe's spiritual history, culture and ceremonies. She is also recognized as a warrior by her people, reflected by a spear tattoo on her chest. Later lover of Marian Alston.
- Rosita Menendez: A registered nurse, early associate of Walker, later third wife of Isketerol and lesser Queen of Tartessos
- Helmut Mittler: A former East German Stasi agent, Mittler assists William Walker in turning his Greek empire into a police state. Ian Arnstein, a prisoner of Walker and the Achaeans, later manipulates him into murdering Walker and his family. Mittler is in turn slain by Odikweos as a traitor.
- Odikweos: King of Ithaka, quick to see the value in befriending William Walker and learning from him. Accompanies Walker on the campaign to conquer Sicily, staying on as military governor afterwards, before returning to become Walker's right-hand man and chief Achaean lieutenant. Supports Walker's rise to High King status after Agamemnon's death, but is never truly comfortable with the changes Walker imposes. Conspires with Ian Arnstein to trick Helmut Mittler into assassinating Walker, then executes Mittler himself and takes the throne. As High King, he signs a peace treaty with Nantucket that maintains Greater Achaea as a superpower.
- Ohotolarix: One of William Walker's most loyal followers, originally from the Iraiina tribe of Alba. He later follows Althea Walker into exile after his lord is murdered, vowing to avenge his death.
- Doreen Rosenthal: A female university astronomy student working in a temporary position at the Nantucket observatory. Rosenthal is of Lithuanian descent and can speak the language. She later marries Ian Arnstein.
- Raupasha: Mitannian princess and sole survivor of the former ruling house. During the Assyrian retreat from the advancing Nantucket/Babylonian armies, she kills the Assyrian king Tukulti-Ninurta I when he attempted to rape her (in the real world, he survived for over 30 years after this date), and is only rescued from being burned alive by the arrival of Kenneth Hollard and the Nantucket vanguard. Raises and leads Mitannian auxiliaries during the war against Greater Achaea, losing an eye and suffering terrible burns saving the allied army from being outflanked in the last great battle. Later marries Kenneth Hollard.
- Althea Walker, of the House of the Wolf: A daughter of William Walker and an unnamed chieftain's daughter from Alba taken prisoner in a raid. She is the only survivor of Helmut Mittler's assassination of her family. At the end of the series, Althea flees with Ohotolarix and a small group of loyalists to Central Asia's Fergana Valley region, far from the reach of the Republic of Nantucket.
- William Walker: The main antagonist of the series is initially a Coast Guard officer on the Eagle, highly intelligent, but power-hungry. After his defection, Walker adopts a wolf's head as his banner and symbol of his house, in reference to Caput gerat lupinum (Latin for "Let his be a wolf's head"), the declaration of outlaw status by a Roman court.

== Connections to the Emberverse series ==
Stirling has confirmed that The Emberverse series is connected to the Nantucket series.

== Reception ==
The series was nominated for the Sidewise Award for Alternate History in 2000.

== See also ==
- Alien space bats
