= Ṯukamuna-wa-Šunama =

Pair of Ugaritic gods

- Pair of Ugaritic gods
- Major cult center: Ugarit
- Parents: El and Athirat

Equivalents
- Kassite: Shuqamuna and Shumaliya (disputed)

Ṯukamuna-wa-Šunama (Ugaritic: ṯkmn w šnm; Thukamuna and Shunama) were a pair of Ugaritic gods who always appear together in known sources. They are best known from the text KTU 1.114, where they help their father El return home after he gets drunk during a feast. Possible connections between their names and these of the Kassite deities Shuqamuna and Shumaliya continue to be a subject of debate.

== Names ==
Ṯukamuna-wa-Šunama (Thukamuna and Shunama) is the conventional vocalization of the binomial Ugaritic theonym ṯkmn w šnm. These two gods always appear as a pair in known Ugaritic texts.

It has been proposed that Ṯukamuna's name might be related to Ugaritic škm and Hebrew šĕkem, "shoulder." Etymology of Šunama's name is presently unknown. The attempts at linking this theonym with El's epithet ‘ab šnm, reinterpreted in this proposal as "father of Šunama," are regarded as unconvincing by Bob Becking. Aicha Rahmouni notes in a more recent publication that ‘ab šnm is most commonly translated as "father of years," and while the precise meaning of the element šnm remains disputed, it is unlikely that it can be interpreted as a name in this context.

While the toponym Shechem might be etymologically related to Ṯukamuna's name, it most likely does not have any connection to the Ugaritic god. A place name similar to Šunama's name is attested as Šunama in the Amarna letters, Šánama in a document listing places related to a campaign of the pharaoh Shoshenq I, and Shunem in multiple books of the Hebrew Bible, but Becking concludes that it is not a cognate of this god's name but more plausibly a homonym. There is also no indication in available sources that it was considered a religious center.

Based on the similarity of the names of Ṯukamuna and the Kassite deity Shuqamuna, it has been suggested that they were analogous, and that the connection can also be extended to Shumaliya and Šunama. Bob Becking states that it is not impossible that Ṯukamuna corresponds to Shuqamuna and that the name of the latter deity was ultimately derived from a Semitic language, rather than from Kassite, though the direction of the influence should remain open for debate. However, he points out Šunama was male and was identified as Ṯukamuna's brother, not spouse, which according to him makes it unlikely that he was analogous to the Kassite mountain goddess. As of 2013, the topic remains a matter of dispute and occasional controversy among researchers.

== In the Ugaritic texts ==
The first text discovered during the initial 1929 excavations in Ras Shamra (Ugarit) describes a ritual taking place over the course of a whole day and the following night which involved offering an ewe and subsequently a ram to Ṯukamuna-wa-Šunama. Similarly, in a text with instructions for a ritual taking place in Ra’šu-Yêni ("the first wine") over the course of multiple days, they are listed jointly as recipients of an ewe and subsequently a ram on the fifteenth day of this month. They are also mentioned multiple times alongside El, his sons (treated collectively) and his divine assembly in a formula meant to guarantee unity between various inhabitants of Ugarit regardless of their origin, which prescribes the offering of a donkey. A text identified as a prayer for well-being mentions them in a long enumeration of deities.

Ṯukamuna-wa-Shunama appear in the myth KTU 1.114, which describes a divine banquet held by El and the following effects of alcohol consumption on this god. This is the only known source mentioning them which is not a ritual text. Dennis Pardee proposes that Šunama corresponds to the nameless gatekeeper of El's house, who early on berates Anat and Ashtart for giving various cuts of meat to the moon god Yarikh, who in this text behaves in a dog-like manner. He also berates El. according to Pardee's interpretation for letting the other deities act the way they did. He points out that Šunama as one of his sons would be an appropriate figure to reprove him. However, El simply keeps drinking. Ṯukamuna-wa-Šunama are directly named in the following section, where they carry the drunk El home. While already held by them, he is attacked by Habayu, a being described as "lord of two horns and a tail" (b‛l qrnm wḏnb), who smears him with feces and urine and makes the senior god collapse. The rest of the text focuses on Anat and Ashtart, who are apparently gathering ingredients for a cure for El's hangover. The tablet ends with what is presumed to be a medical recipe meant to mitigate the side effects of intoxication. It has been suggested that Ṯukamuna-wa-Šunama's actions reflect a sense of filial piety towards their father, as the notion that the ideal son should carry his father home if he gets intoxicated is present in other Ugaritic texts. Their status as El's sons is affirmed by the god list KTU 1.65. Pardee specifies that they were apparently perceived as the youngest sons of this god and Athirat.
