= Island in the Sea of Time =

1998 novel by S.M. Stirling

- First edition
- Author: S. M. Stirling
- Cover artist: Mike Wimmer
- Language: English
- Series: Nantucket series
- Genre: Alternate history, science fiction
- Publisher: Roc Books
- Publication date: February 1, 1998 (U.S. and Canada); March 1, 1998 (United Kingdom)
- Publication place: United States
- Media type: Print (Paperback)
- Pages: 608
- Followed by: Against the Tide of Years

Island in the Sea of Time is a science fiction novel by Canadian-American writer S. M. Stirling, the first of the three alternate history books in the Nantucket series. It was released in the United States and Canada on February 1, 1998 and in the United Kingdom precisely a month later.

== Plot summary ==
At 9:15 pm EST on March 17, 1998, a circular region, including the island of Nantucket and the United States Coast Guard cutter Eagle sailing nearby, are transported by an unknown phenomenon (called "The Event") back in time to the Bronze Age circa 1250s B.C. (corresponding to the late Heroic Age of the Trojan War).

As the truth of what has happened sinks in, panic grips the island. Chief of Police Jared Cofflin is given emergency powers and begins organizing the people to produce food for the island so they can feed themselves. Meanwhile, Captain Marian Alston takes the Eagle to Great Britain, with ancient-Greek-speaking classics historian Ian Arnstein and Lithuanian-speaking Doreen Rosenthal as interpreters, where they trade Nantucket-made goods with the Iraiina for grain. (The Lithuanian language in its modern version possesses identifiable links to proto-Indo-European.) The Iraiina, whose name translates as "noble ones", are a "Sun People" tribe that has been steadily invading Britain. As a gift, the Iraiina chief gives Alston a slave, Swindapa, a captured female "Earth People" warrior. Swindapa is freed and decides to stay with Alston. The Eagle leaves for Nantucket, but takes with them Isketerol, a wily Tartessian merchant who hopes to learn from the Americans. While the people of Nantucket work for their survival, the ambitious and ruthless Lieutenant William Walker of the Eagle decides that with modern technology he could become a king. With the help of Isketerol and others, Walker convinces some naive environmentalists to steal a ship and kidnap Cofflin's wife, so they can give the benefits of modern culture to Native Americans. Meanwhile, Walker and Isketerol steal another ship and return to Britain to recruit soldiers for their eventual takeover of Greece. Alston decides to rescue Cofflin's wife and saves her after defeating an Olmec army. The Olmecs proceed to kill the modern Americans who sought to help them.

Walker solidifies his control over the Sun People, while Nantucket creates a new government and prepares to attack him. Alston returns to Britain with a small army and uses Swindapa, who has become her lover, to convince the Earth People to fight with them to defeat Walker. Both sides meet at the Battle of the Downs. Though Nantucket and its allies are victorious, Walker manages to escape with his followers to Greece.

== See also ==
- Dies the Fire – "The Event" that sends Nantucket back in time also changes the law of physics in the Emberverse series

== Sources ==
- Steven H Silver (1998). "SF Site Featured Review: Island In the Sea of Time". Book Review. SF Site. Archived from the original on April 28, 1999.
