= Sirsir =

Mesopotamian god

- God of sailors
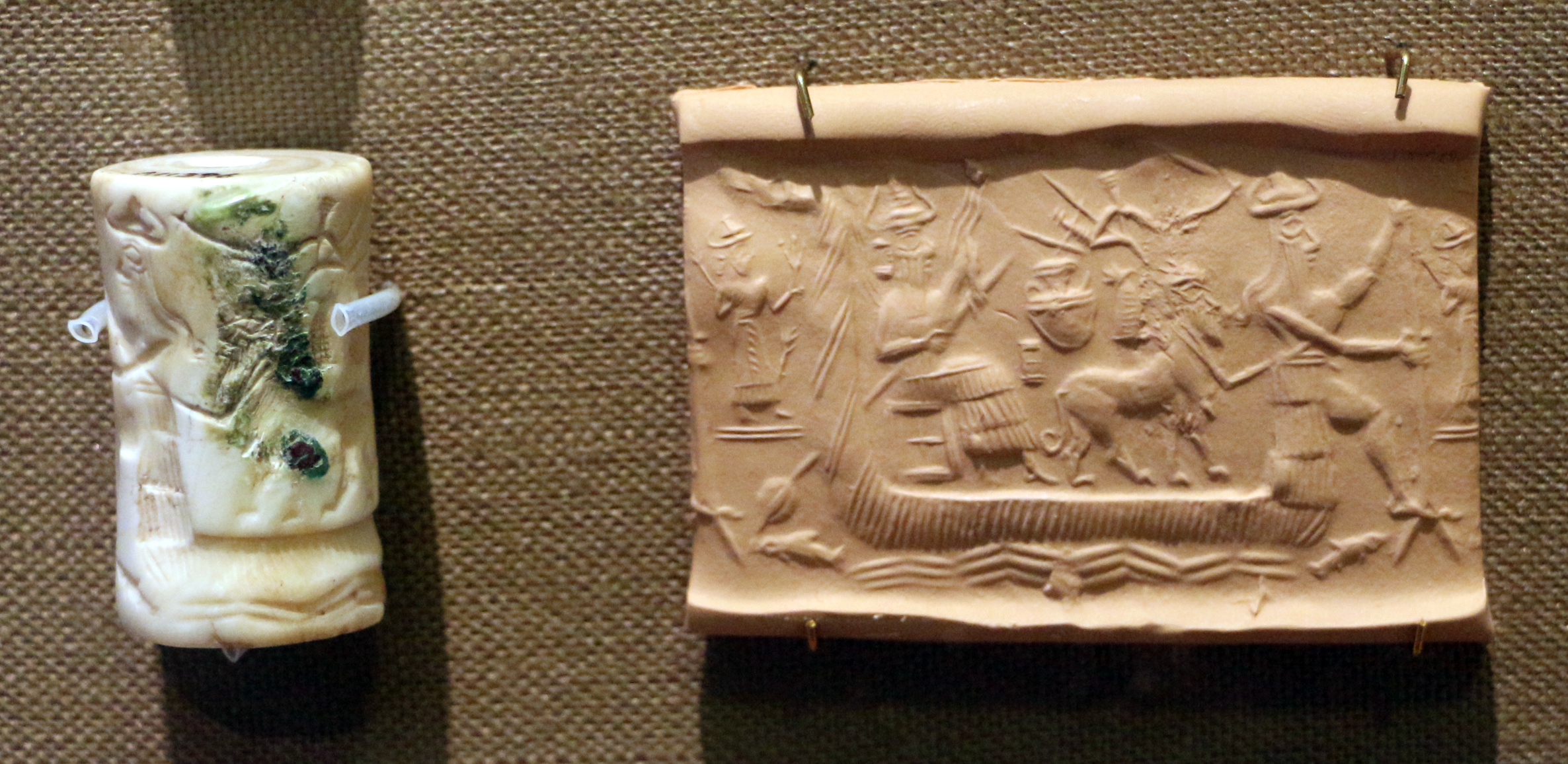
- Cylinder seal and modern impression showing the so-called "boat god," a figure sometimes identified with Sirsir. Sargonic period, Oriental Institute Museum.
- Other names: Ninsirsir

Sirsir, also known as Ninsirsir, was a Mesopotamian god. He was associated with sailors. It has been proposed that he corresponds to the so-called "boat god" motif known from cylinder seals, but this theory is not universally accepted.

== Character ==
Sirsir was the god of sailors. He could be identified as the boatman of Enki. Proposed translations of his name include "slithering one" and "rower." In the text Marduk's Address to the Demons he appears alongside Laguda, also argued to be a god associated with the sea. A late god list explains his role as that of "Ea of the boatman." In Muššu'e, he is placed in the proximity of Marduk, and identified with Tutu. A single late hymn identifies him as a son of Qingu.

Frans Wiggermann argues that in addition to being the god of sailors, he was also associated with vegetation.

== Worship ==
Sirsir is already present in the Early Dynastic god list from Abu Salabikh. One of the Zame Hymns is dedicated to him, which indicates he was likely a deity of relatively high rank at this time. He belonged to the pantheon of Eridu. It has also been proposed that he had his own cult city somewhere on the coast of the Persian Gulf.

== Mythology ==
Sirsir appears in the myth Enki and the World Order, in which he is designated as the captain (ensi) of the eponymous god's boat.

In the Enuma Elish, Sirsir is listed as the twenty eighth of the fifty names of Marduk:

Sirsir, who heaped up a mountain on top of Tiamat, Who plundered the corpse of Tiamat with [his] weapons

According to Wilfred G. Lambert, it is possible that this passage was an echo of an originally independent tradition, in which it was Sirsir, rather than Marduk, who battled a personification of the sea.

Sirsir is also mentioned in the text Marduk's Address to the Demons as a deity separate from Marduk:

I am Asallulḫi whom Sirsir nominates in the upper sea, I am Asallulḫi whom Laguda exalts in the lower sea

== Sirsir and the "boat god" art motif ==
It has been proposed that Sirsir can be identified with the so-called "boat god," a motif known from cylinder seals. However, this identification has yet to be conclusively proven.

The boat god is usually depicted transporting the sun god Utu/Shamash. Typical portrayals have a snake tail, though sometimes he can also have two or four legs. A snake or dragon head might be placed on the end of the tail. Most attestations of this motif are known from the Diyala area and the Hamrin Mountains, fewer come from Kish and Mari, and only three or four are known from southern Mesopotamia. Based on the distribution of these works of art and on the serpentine form of the "boat god" Frans Wiggermann proposed an association between him and the gods of the "trans-Tigridian" region, such as Ishtaran from Der and Inshushinak from Susa.

According to Helene J. Kantor, an argument against the identification of the boat god with Sirsir is the apparent relatively high status of the latter in the Early Dynastic sources.
