= Enlil-nadin-shumi =

Enlil-nādin-šumi
- King of Babylon
- Reign: c. 1224 BC
- Predecessor: Kaštiliašu IV
- Successor: Kadašman-Ḫarbe II
- House: Kassite

Enlil-nādin-šumi, inscribed ^{md}EN.LĺL-MU-MU (Note: Kinglist A, BM 33332, ii 8.) or ^{md}EN.LĺL-na-din-MU, (Note: Chronicle P, BM 92807, iv 14, 16.) meaning “Enlil is the giver of a name,” was a king of Babylon, c. 1224 BC, following the overthrow of Kaštiliašu IV by Tukulti-Ninurta I of Assyria. Recorded as the 29th ruler of the Kassite dynasty, his reign was a fleeting one year, six months (or perhaps just six months, depending on the reading of MU 1 ITI 6 in the Kinglist A,) before he was swept from power by the invasion of the Elamite forces under the last king of the Igehalkid dynasty, Kidin-Hutran III.

== Biography ==
The sequence of events in the aftermath of the fall of Kaštiliašu IV is by no means certain. Enlil-nādin-šumi may well have acceded in the power vacuum left by the capture of his predecessor in the two-year period between Assyrian campaigns, the latter of which led to the sack of Babylon and possibly the imposition of foreign rule. Alternatively, he may have been appointed as a vassal of the Assyrians following their conquest. Shigeo Yamada proposes that Tukulti-Ninurta's rule followed that of the three Kassite successors of Kaštiliašu, beginning with Enlil-nādin-šumi. A restoration of his name in the Assyrian Synchronistic Kinglist (Note: Synchronistic Kinglist, ii 2.) confirms him as a contemporary of Tukulti-Ninurta.

A small cache of tablets from the Merkes section of Babylon were once dated to his reign, but are now thought to be dated to Enlil-nādin-aḫe (Note: Tablets VAT 13230 and VAT 21995, although the latter lacks the last element of the name.) However, a document from Tell Zubeidi, a small rural community in the Hamrin basin of the upper Diyala river in northeastern Babylonia which was occupied during the 13th and 12th centuries, has an incomplete date of his reign.

The Elamites, under their king Kidin-Hutran, called Kidin-Ḫutrudiš in Chronicle P which describes these events, invaded and devastated Nippur and Der, including its temple of Edimgal-kalama, leading their people into captivity and bringing Enlil-nādin-šumi's brief rule to an abrupt end, iṭrudma Enlil-nādin-šumi šarra ukkiš bēlussu, as it puts it, “removed Enlil-nādin-šumi the king, and eliminated his rulership.” He was succeeded by Kadašman-Ḫarbe II, whose reign was equally brief.

There was also a "Letter of Samsuiluna to Enlil-nadin-šumi" in the Neo-Babylonian scribal curriculum.
