= Against the Tide of Years =

1999 novel by S. M. Stirling

- Author: S. M. Stirling
- Cover artist: Domenick D'Andrea
- Language: English
- Series: Nantucket series
- Genre: Alternate history, science fiction
- Publisher: Roc Books
- Publication date: May 1, 1999 (USA, Canada, and the UK)
- Publication place: United States
- Media type: Print (Paperback)
- Pages: 454
- ISBN: 978-0-451-45743-1
- Preceded by: Island in the Sea of Time
- Followed by: On the Oceans of Eternity

Against the Tide of Years is a science fiction novel by Canadian-American writer S. M. Stirling, the second out of the three alternate history books in the Nantucket series. The novel was released in the United States, Canada, and the United Kingdom on May 1, 1999.

== Plot introduction ==
In the Island in the Sea of Time, the island of Nantucket in Massachusetts is transported by an unknown phenomenon (called "The Event" in the series) on March 17, 1998, at 9:15 P.M. EST back in time to the Bronze Age circa 1250s BC (corresponding to the late Heroic Age of the Trojan War). Against the Tide of Years is set from 8 to 10 years afterward.

== Plot summary ==
As the series progresses, it becomes clear to Nantucket's government that sitting back and adopting isolationism will only profit those renegades who, under the leadership of ex-Coast Guard lieutenant William Walker, have fled the island to exploit the Bronze Age peoples of Europe and the Middle East. Walker—who is as capable as he is callous—exploits the "magic" of gunpowder, iron-forging, and the spinning jenny to build up an empire of his own, one that threatens to conquer the entire world unless the people of Nantucket build an army, a navy, and a web of foreign alliances to take the fight to Walker.

Against the Tide of Years takes place approximately 10 years after the events of the first book. The leadership of the Republic of Nantucket has invested a great deal of time and effort into building up a substantial military force, both a deep-water navy and a Marine Corps, but the bulk of Nantucket's population are more interested in commerce and exploration than in bringing the renegade Walker to justice. A sneak attack on Nantucket itself by the nation of Tartessos, led by an ally of Walker, unites the factions of the Republic behind an all-out effort to topple Walker's growing empire, centered in Achaea (Greece), in a two-pronged campaign, attacking Tartessos and opening a second front in the Middle East (through an alliance with Babylon, the Hittite Empire and Mitanni).

Closer to home, the Nantucket islanders embark on some North American colonization, particularly in Long Island, anticipating by thousands of years 17th century colonization of the same area.

== See also ==
- The Emberverse series
