= On the Oceans of Eternity =

2000 novel by S. M. Stirling

- First edition
- Author: S. M. Stirling
- Cover artist: Don Kueker
- Language: English
- Series: Nantucket series
- Genre: Alternate history, science fiction
- Publication date: April 10, 2000 (USA and Canada); April 29, 2000 (UK)
- Publication place: United States
- Media type: Print (Paperback)
- Preceded by: Against the Tide of Years

On the Oceans of Eternity is a 2000 American science fiction novel by Canadian-American writer S. M. Stirling, the third and final book of the Nantucket alternate history series. The novel was released in the United States and Canada on April 10, 2000, and was released in the United Kingdom on April 29 of the same year.

== Plot introduction ==
In the first novel Island in the Sea of Time, the island of Nantucket in Massachusetts is transported by an unknown phenomenon (called "The Event" in the series) back in time on March 17, 1998 at 9:15 pm EST to the Bronze Age circa 1250s BC (corresponding to the late Heroic Age of the Trojan War).

== Plot summary ==
After making an alliance with Babylon, Hatti, and Mitanni, the Republic of Nantucket is ready to defeat Walker (who now controls Great Achaean, i.e. Mycenaean Greece) and his allies. They are, however, too late to save the beleaguered Troy. While Nantucktar forces are tied up in defending an isolated outpost in the mountains, this history's version of the Trojan War comes to an end without the subtle ploy of the Trojan Horse. Rather, Walker's modern weaponry overwhelms the Trojan defenses, and the city's inhabitants suffer a gruesome sack. Still, retribution is not far off: Walker is finally brought down by the Nantucktars – not in frontal attack, but in a Machiavellian trick. Walker's regent of Great Achaean, Odikweos, embittered upon learning that Walker, by changing history, has robbed him of the undying fame that was to have been his (as Odysseus), aids the Nantuckers in tricking Walker's security chief, an odious former operative of the East German Stasi, into poisoning Walker; his sadistic fellow American turncoat and lover, Dr. Alice Hong; and all but one of his children.

In the aftermath, Odikweos, who turns out to be every bit as crafty and resourceful as Homer depicted him, gains control of Great Achaean and ends the war with Nantucket. Things look well as the alliance with Babylon is cemented, the Babylonian king getting at his side an American queen who also commands the modernized Babylonian army, and an American doctor married to a Babylonian healer starts on building up the new University of Babylon. The Nantucktars seek to extend their influence into Pharaonic Egypt – with whose forces they fought in the contested Canaan. The Nantucktars worked on subverting the captured Egyptian generals and bringing them into the Nantuckar fold. In the Western Hemisphere, the prosperous Republic of Nantucket got an increasing number of new immigrants and prepare to plant a new colony in what would have been Argentina.

Dangers lurk on the horizon. Walker's surviving teenage daughter, already exhibiting both her father's intelligence and his ruthless determination, escaped with faithful retainers into the depths of Asia. She waited and plotted revenge on the hated Islanders. South of Egypt, in what would have been Sudan, another American renegade, a staunch Black Nationalist was building a power base of his own. Tartessos, under its own wily and resourceful ruler, is determined to emulate and rival Nantucket and build its own global maritime empire. The Tartessians have been defeated both in a head-on invasion of Nantucket itself and in an effort to steal a march and build a hidden power base among the Native Americans of California, and for the time being they are willing to keep the peace – but their imperial dreams are far from shelved.

== See also ==
- The Emberverse series
