= Kassite deities =

Deities of the Kassites

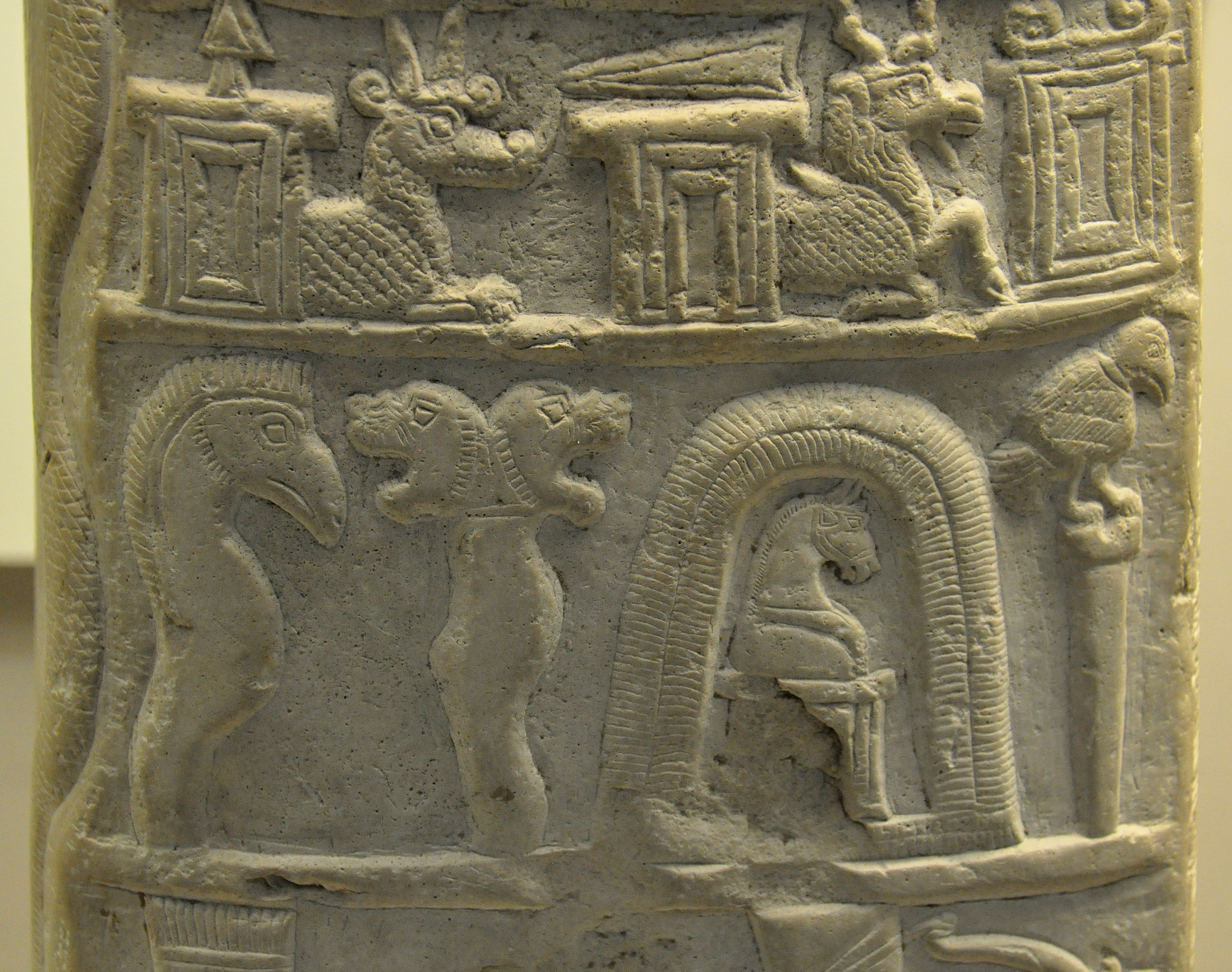
Detail from a kudurru of Ritti-Marduk, from Sippar, Iraq, 1125-1104 BCE. A perching bird, symbol of Šuqamuna and Šumaliya, can be seen at the lower right. British Museum.

Kassite deities were the pantheon of the Kassites (Akkadian: Kaššû, from Kassite Galzu), a group inhabiting parts of modern Iraq (mostly historical Babylonia and the Nuzi area), as well as Iran and Syria, in the second and first millennia BCE. A dynasty of Kassite origin ruled Babylonia starting with the fifteenth century BCE. Kassites spoke the Kassite language, known from references in Mesopotamian sources. Many of the known Kassite words are names of Kassite deities. Around twenty have been identified so far. The evidence of their cult is limited, and only two of them, Šuqamuna and Šumaliya, are known to have had a temple. Other well attested Kassite deities include the presumed head god Ḫarbe, the weather god Buriaš, the sun god Saḫ and the deified mountain Kamulla.

== Overview ==
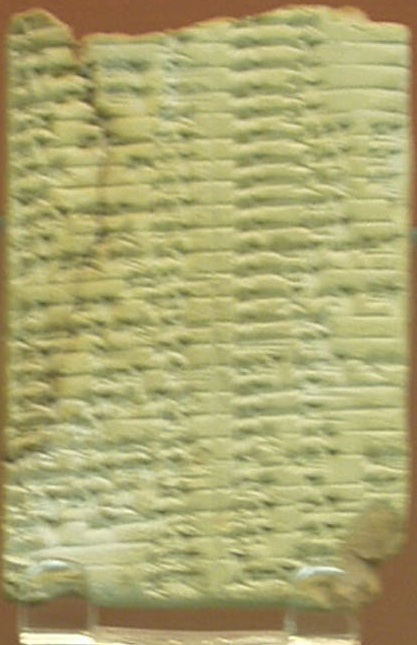
Tablet with a Kassite-Akkadian vocabulary (ca. 1200-800 BCE). British Museum.

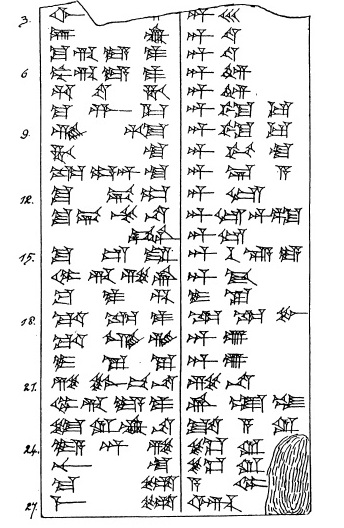
T. G. Pinches' drawing showing the cuneiform writing of the names of Kassite gods and their Babylonian equivalents.

Around two dozen of names Kassite deities have been identified in texts written in the Kassite language, a language isolate only known from references in Mesopotamian lexical texts and from personal names. Detailed study is not possible due to lack of any sources preserving its grammar and syntax.

Much of the evidence of Kassite culture pertains to the Kassite dynasty of Babylon. Those kings adopted both the languages (Sumerian and Akkadian) and religion of the Babylonians, and were actively involved in maintaining temples of Mesopotamian deities, for example Eanna in Uruk. For this reason, Nathanael Shelley notes it would be more accurate to refer to it as a dynasty whose members had Kassite names, rather than a strictly Kassite dynasty. Starting with Kadašman-Enlil I, some of them started to include the names of Mesopotamian gods in their names, though only after the invasion of Assyrian king Tukulti-Ninurta I examples include deities other than Enlil, such as Marduk, Adad or Zababa. They also attributed their royal legitimacy from Mesopotamian Enlil, rather than from a Kassite deity. There is no evidence that the Kassite dynasty built any temples of Kassite gods in Babylonia, with the exception of one dedicated to the dynastic tutelary deities Šuqamuna and Šumaliya in Babylon. Despite their role, these two deities do not appear in the names of any of its members.

The archives from Nuzi in northeastern Mesopotamia are considered to be a valuable resource in the study of Kassite onomastics, even though only two percent of the city's inhabitants bore Kassite names, and there is no indication that they had any larger impact on the culture of its other inhabitants.

The ordinary Kassites living in Babylonia came to be gradually assimilated, and by the first millennium BCE only around fifteen percent of them bore Kassite names. Some of the names invoked Mesopotamian, rather than Kassite, deities: Adad, Enlil, Ištar of Agade, Ištaran (^{d}KA.DI), Laguda, Marduk and Urash. Babylonian and Assyrian rulers most likely tolerated the worship of Kassite deities, and some of them are still attested in sources from Mesopotamia from the first millennium BCE. It is possible that their role was limited to domestic religion, where they may have played the role of a marker of distinct Kassite identity. However, they are entirely absent from non-royal personal votive inscriptions.

Most Kassite deities are only attested in personal names. It is often difficult to tell which elements of them should be interpreted as names of deities, and which are actually linguistically Kassite (rather than just not recognizably Babylonian). Furthermore, some of the words identified as names of individual deities might also be epithets. While it has been argued in the past that all the names of early Kassite rulers were theophoric, this theory is now regarded as implausible. An example of a most likely non-theophoric name is that of Kurigalzu, which means "shepherd of the Kassites." The name Karaindaš is also assumed to not be theophoric.

With the exception of Šuqamuna and Šumaliya, names of Kassite deities were always written without the dingir sign, so-called "divine determinative," which was used to designate names gods in Mesopotamian texts. Sporadic exceptions from this rule involving the names of Maruttaš and Kamulla are known, and in a single instance Buriaš is preceded by the dingir sign in a god list: ^{d}bur-ia-aš, explained as ^{d}IŠKUR kaš-šu-u_{2}, "the Kassite weather god." Occasional references in literature to a singular instance of Saḫ written with a dingir in a personal name, Kadašman-Saḫ, are the result of an erroneous restoration. With the exception of Ḫarbe, Šuqamuna and Šumaliya, no Kassite deities have known iconography.

Lexical lists at times attest equivalencies between Mesopotamian and Kassite deities. Most of those texts likely postdate the Kassite period. It is possible that in some cases Kassite deities mentioned in them were assimilated into Mesopotamian ones, and lost their uniquely Kassite traits.

A few kings from later periods had Kassite theoporic names. The founder of the Second Sealand dynasty bore the name Simbar-Šiḫu (or Simbar-Šipak), invoking the Kassite deity Ši-ḪU, though inscriptions pertaining to his reign only mention his involvement in the worship of Enlil and Shamash, and it is possible that he saw himself as a successor of the First Sealand dynasty, rather than the Kassite one, as chronicles call him a "soldier of the dynasty of Damiq-ilīšu". The last king of the so-called Bazi dynasty, which might have had Kassite origin, bore a theophoric name invoking Šuqamuna, Širikti-Šuqamuna. He reigned for only three months in 985 BCE, no inscriptions attributed to him survive, and it is assumed he was a brother of the previous king, Ninurta-kudurri-usur I.

=== Disproved theories ===
In nineteenth and twentieth century scholarship, attempts were made to prove that some of the Kassite deities, namely Buriaš, Maruttaš and Šuriaš (argued to be cognates of Greek Boreas and Vedic Maruts and Surya, respectively), were derivatives of Indo-European deities. Such theories, formulated for example by Georges Dumézil, were labeled as far-fetched as early as in 1954. As noted by John A. Brinkman, the similarities between names "even if accepted, need not to imply more than temporary and perhaps mediate contact between the various groups or their cultural forebears." Furthermore, possible Kassite etymologies have been proposed for the names Buriaš and Šuriaš, while proposed Vedic connections of Maruttaš are no longer accepted in modern scholarship.

== List of Kassite deities ==
Name	Mesopotamian equivalent	Details
Alban Ban		Alban and Ban are two possible names of Kassite deities known from personal names. They might be two spellings of one name.
Apku		A possible name of a Kassite deity, attested in the name Karzi-Apku.
Bugaš		A possible name of a Kassite deity, attested in personal names.
Buriaš Burarriaš, Ubriaš	Adad	Buriaš was a weather god. Oldest recorded Kassite name belongs to a certain Kilamdi-Buriaš, who is mentioned in an economic document from the fifty third year of the reign of Rim-Sîn I of Larsa. The same god is also attested in the names of Kassite kings Burna-Buriaš I, Burna-Buriaš II and Ulam-Buriaš. In a single lexical text, he is labeled as EN.KUR.KUR, "lord of the lands," a title not attested for Adad, but similar to Enlil's epithet LUGAL KUR.KUR.RA, attested in many sources from the Kassite period. On this basis, it has been proposed that Buriaš was a title, rather than a name. It was likely derived from the words buri (early form: burari), "lord" and iaš (early form: iaši/u), "land." Other Kassite words with a similar structure are known too.
Duniaš		Duniaš is a Kassite word attested in the Kassite name of Babylonia, Karduniaš. There is no consensus on whether it should be considered a divine name or not, as no evidence confirming either proposal is presently available.
Dur	Nergal	Based on lexical texts, Dur was one of the Kassite deities identified with Nergal. He is not attested in any personal names.
Duzagaš		It is assumed that Duzagaš was Kassite in origin. He is known from an inscription on a stone duck weight attributed to king Ḫammurapi of Ḫana, who was a contemporary of the Kassite kings of Babylonia, and possibly their vassal.
Gidar Gindar, Kintar	Ninurta	A god known from a lexical list, which equates him with Ninurta. He is also attested in the theophoric name Ula-Gindar. It is possible that Kintar, known from Nuzi, is a variant of the name Gidar.
Ḫala Ḫali	Gula	A goddess known from a lexical list which equates her with Gula and from personal names from Nuzi and Nippur. Kemal Balkan proposed that she was a healing goddess and that Gidar might have been regarded as her spouse.
Ḫarbe	Enlil	Ḫarbe was likely the head of the Kassite pantheon. He is one of the most common deities in Kassite theophoric names. Two kings were named after him, Kadašman-Ḫarbe I and Kadašman-Ḫarbe II. According to Wilfred G. Lambert, his name might be an appellative meaning "lord." Possible evidence for this are personal names such as Ḫarbe-Saḫ and Ḫarbe-Ši-ḪU. His symbol, known from some kudurru, was a bird with its head turned back. ḪARba, an element of an only partially preserved personal name, might be an alternate spelling of Ḫarbe, but it is not certain if it is a divine name at all.
Ḫudak Ḫudḫa	Adad	Ḫudak and Ḫudḫa are assumed to be two forms of the name of the same god. The former is attested in a theophoric name, Inza-Ḫudak, the latter in a lexical text which explains him as Adad. It has been proposed that if the theory according to which Buriaš was an epithet rather than a separate god is correct, Ḫudḫa might be the name of the deity designated by it. Daniel Schwemer considers this issue to be unresolved.
Kamulla Akmul, Kamul	Ea	Kamulla was a mountain god or outright a deification of the mountain bearing the same name, likely located south or southeast of the Radanu river, in the proximity of the Diyala basin. He appears in theophoric names, for example Taklaku-ana-Kamulla.
Maruttaš Muruttaš, Marattaš	Ninurta	Maruttaš is known from lexical lists and from personal names such as Nazi-Maruttaš and Karzi-Maruttaš, the former of which was apparently considered analogous to the name Sil(li)-Ninurta, "protection of Ninurta." Theories proposing a connection between him and either the Vedic Maruts or Luwian Runtiya are no longer regarded as credible in modern scholarship. Rattaš, a word attested in the name Abi-Rattaš, might be connected to Maruttaš, but it is not certain if it should be considered a divine name at all.
Mirizir Minizir, Minimzir		Mirizir was a Kassite goddess possibly connected with horses. Her name likely corresponds to minizir or minimzir, an element known from horse names, which in turn appears to be connected with nimzir, a term used to designate a type of these animals. Kemal Balkan proposed that a horse head symbol found on some kudurru corresponds to her. In more a more recent study of kudurru iconography, Ursula Seidl assumes that it represented an unknown possibly non-Mesopotamian local deity worshiped by highland communities in the proximity of modern Kirkuk Mirizir did not correspond to any specific Mesopotamian goddess in lexical texts, but rather to the generic epithet Bēltu (^{d}GAŠAN). She appears in theophoric names such as Meli-Minimzir.
Saḫ	Shamash	Saḫ was the Kassite sun god. He is attested in numerous theophoric names, such as Kadašman-Saḫ, Kari-Saḫ or Ula-Saḫ. He appears in forty three different names known from documents from Kassite Nippur, more than any other Kassite, Elamite or Hurrian deity, as well as such Mesopotamian deities as Gula, Amurru and Nabu. Another similar possible Kassite divine name, Zaḫ, occurs in two personal names from the same location.
Ši-ḪU (Šiḫu or Šipak)	Sin, Marduk	The name Ši-ḪU is read either as Šiḫu or Šipak. It has been proposed that he was a moon god. A lexical text explains him as Sin, but he could also be equated with Marduk, as indicated by an extensive list of names of the latter god.
Šikme		A possible name of a Kassite deity attested in personal names, for example Burra-Šikme. Kemal Balkan proposed that Šikme might have been a derivative of the name of the Hurrian sun god, Šimige.
Šugab	Nergal	Šugab is attested in numerous Kassite theophoric names, such as Burte-Šugab. It is possible that he was not a separate deity, but merely an alternate form of the name Šuqamuna (perhaps originating in a dialect), as one source listing Kassite names equates them, though in this context Šuqamuna appears as a part of the Akkadian, rather than Kassite, column. Both of them appear in an equal number of Kassite names from Nippur.
Šuḫur		This possible theonym is attested in the personal name Šuḫur-ni.
Šumaliya Šimaliya		Šumaliya was a goddess who was the partner (paredra) of Šuqamuna. It is uncertain if her origin was Kassite. She was a mountain deity, as indicated by an inscription from the reign of Nebuchadnezzar I which describes her as a goddess living on the mountaintops and traveling through fields of snow. She is also included among the deities labeled as "gods of the land of Namar," known to be mountainous. The same text which equates Šumaliya with Šugab also lists an alternate name of Šumaliya, Šibarru. The former occurs in the Akkadian column, while the latter in Kassite. On kudurru, Šumaliya and Šuqamuna were depicted as birds on a perch. Anthropomorphic depictions of either of these deities are not presently known.
Šuqamuna	Nergal, Nuska, Marduk	Šuqamuna is the best attested Kassite deity. His partner (paredra) was Šumaliya, and in one kudurru inscription they are jointly referred to as "the gods who love each other" (ilānu murtâmū). The two of them were the tutelary deities of the Kassite dynasty of Babylon. King Agum II referred to himself as "pure seed of Šuqamuna" in one inscription. It has also proposed that Šuqamuna was a mountain god. It is uncertain if he was a Kassite deity in origin, and in one lexical list he occurs in the Akkadian, rather than Kassite, column. He appears in numerous theophoric names from the Kassite period, including not only Kassite, but also Akkadian ones, such as Šuqamuna-appla-idina. He was worshiped in the Zagros foothills, including the city of Der, from which a statue of him was taken away in the ninth century BCE. There is also an account of statues of Šuqamuna and Šumaliya being returned to Sippar-Aruru during the reign of Esarhaddon. In lexical lists, Šuqamuna is equated with both Nergal and Nuska, while a late theological text labels him as "Marduk of the container." A connection between him and the Hurrian goddess Šuwala, proposed by Kemal Balkan (who erroneously identified her as a male deity who he deemed the "Hurrian Ninurta"), is now regarded as implausible. On kudurru, Šuqamuna and Šumaliya were depicted as birds on a perch. Anthropomorphic depictions of either of these deities are not presently known. though it has been proposed that the deities on the facade of Eanna, added during the reign of Karaindaš, represent the tutelary deities of his family.
Šuriaš	Shamash	Šuriaš was a name of the Kassite sun god, but he appears much less frequently than Saḫ in known sources. Kemal Balkan proposed that Šuriaš was only an epithet of Saḫ, not a separate deity. He is only attested in a single theophoric name, Šagarakti-Šuriaš. A connection with the name Surya has been proposed, but Manfred Krebernik notes that there is also a plausible indigenously Kassite etymology, from šuri, of unknown meaning, and iaš, "land." Multiple known Kassite words have similar structure.
Tiliaš		Tiliaš is an element attested in Kassite personal names which has been tentatively identified as an epithet of an unidentified deity. Whether it is a divine name cannot be proven conclusively.
Turgu		Turgu is assumed to be the name of a Kassite deity, but is not attested outside of two personal names, Kadašman-Turgu and Me-Turgu.

== Gods of Kassite origin in other religions of ancient Near East ==
=== Mesopotamia ===
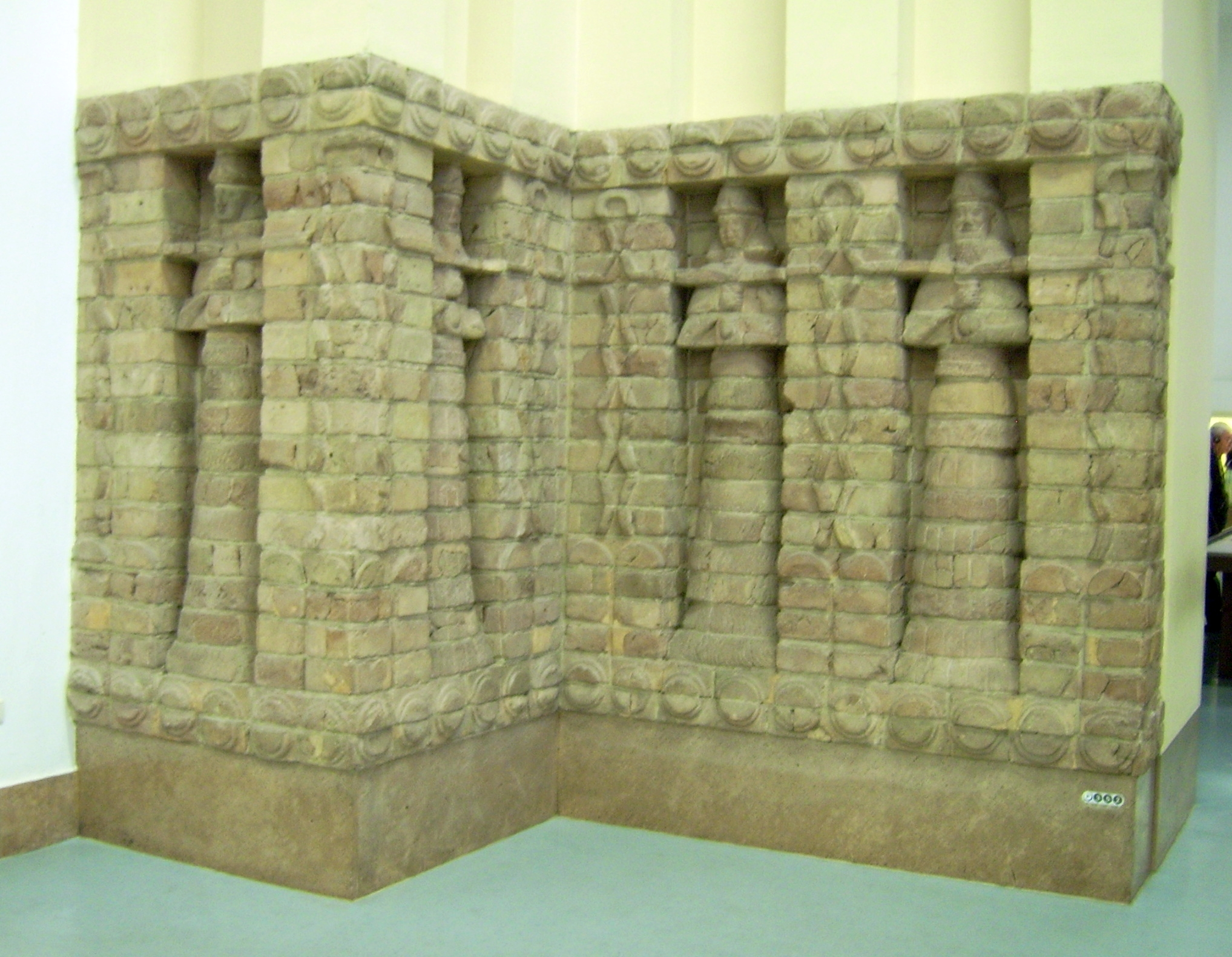
Part of the front of the Eanna temple. Vorderasiatisches Museum Berlin.

Šuqamuna and Šumaliya were incorporated into the Mesopotamian pantheon. While they could be listed alongside Mesopotamian deities in inscriptions on kudrru, they usually appear in the end of such enumerations of gods, indicating their status in Mesopotamian theology was not high. It has also been proposed the deities on the facade of Eanna, added during the reign of Karaindaš, represent the tutelary deities of his family.

A god named Kaššû (^{d}kaš-šu-ú), "the Kassite," appears in Babylonian theophoric names, though only after the Kassite period, according to Grant Frame exclusively between the years 1008 and 955 BCE. The last king of the Second Sealand dynasty bore the theophoric name Kaššu-nādin-aḫi, while a certain Kaššu-bēl-zēri, known from an inscription concerned with an offering to the goddess Uṣur-amāssu, was a governor of the Sealand province of Babylonia at some point in the late eleventh or first half of the tenth century BCE. It has been proposed that Kaššu was derived from Šuqamuna, or that he represented a stereotype of Kassite identity in Babylonian culture. A goddess with a similar name, Kaššītu (^{d}kaš-ši-tu, "the Kassite") appears in sources from the first millennium BCE, and might have developed from Šumaliya, though it has also been proposed that she represented a complete innovation, as other goddesses personifying population groups are attested for the first time from the same period, namely Aḫlamayītu ("the Aramean") and Sutītu ("the Sutean"). Kaššītu was worshiped in Babylon in the temple of Belet Ninua ("Lady of Nineveh"). She is also mentioned among deities Sennacherib carried off from Uruk, but she is absent from offering lists from the city's archive, attached to the Eanna temple.

=== Ugarit ===
According to Dennis Pardee, in the Ugaritic text RS 24.246, a list of hypostases of Ugaritic deities, there is a reference to the "Kassite moon" or "Kassite Yarikh," Yrḫ Kṯy, presumably a deity of Kassite origin. Yrḫ Kṯy is also mentioned in the texts RS 1.001, an offering list according to which he received a cow, and RS 24.271, a prayer for well-being.

Additionally, it has been proposed that Šuqamuna and Šumaliya correspond to the Ugaritic deities Ṯkmn and Šnm (Ṯukamuna-wa-Šunama), known from the text KTU 1.114 (RS 24.258), in which they carry the head god El after he got drunk. On the basis of this theory, Dennis Pardee proposed that "Ṯukmuna" was a deity with a Semitic name, adopted into the Kassite pantheon. However, the supposed presence of Šuqamuna and Šumaliya in the Ugaritic texts is a controversial topic in scholarship, and the matter is unresolved.

=== Elam ===
A temple of Kamul (Kamulla) is known from an inscription of the Elamite king Shutruk-Nahhunte, according to which he renovated it. Ran Zadok proposes that its existence was the result of a marriage between a Kassite princess and an Elamite king.

Wilfred G. Lambert tentatively proposed a connection between Mirizir and the Elamite goddess Manziniri.
