= Tukulti-Ninurta Epic =

Tukilti-Ninurta Epic is an Assyrian epic written in Akkadian describing and glorifying the wars and conquests of the Assyrian king Tukulti-Ninurta I against the Babylonian king Kashtiliash IV during the Kassite dynasty. Though in principle successful (the Assyrians kidnapped the statue of Babylon's city's god, Marduk), due to Babylonian rebellions and the interference of Elam, Assur had to return the city to the Kassites. It can therefore be considered as a form of propaganda.
