= Šuqamuna =

Šuqamuna (^{d}Šu-qa-mu-na) was the Kassite war god. His consort was Šumalija, and they are described as "a loving couple." Šuqamuna was equated with the Babylonian gods Nergal and Nusku. In other inscriptions, he is mentioned together with the light god Nusku. His symbol is the mace.

Attempts have also been made to equate him with ṯkmn, the Ugaritic moon god.

Šuqamuna was regarded as the ancestor of the royal house. In an inscription, Agum Kakrime, the second ruler of the dynasty, calls himself "son of Uršig-urumaš, pure seed of Šuqamuna, appointed by Anu and Enlil, Ea and Marduk, Sin and Šamaš, the strongman of the warlike Ištar".

Šuqamuna and Šumalija were referred to as "the gods of the king", or "the gods of the king and the royal house". Another kudurru of Marduk-apla-iddina describes them as "the awe-inspiring gods who strengthen the scepter, throne, and reign". Kurigalzu calls them "god of the king and protective goddess of the king (il šarri u_{3} ^{d}lamassu šarri). According to an inscription by Kurigalzu III, Šuqamuna and Šumalija participated in the king’s coronation ceremony in Babylon.

Šuqamuna is also attested in Namar in the Zagros, Nuzi, Dēr, Ugarit, and Ḫattuša.

== Notes ==
- K. Balkan, Kassite Studies. 1. The Language of the Kassites (AOS 37). New Haven 1954.
