= Tablet of Akaptaḫa =

Mesopotamian inscription

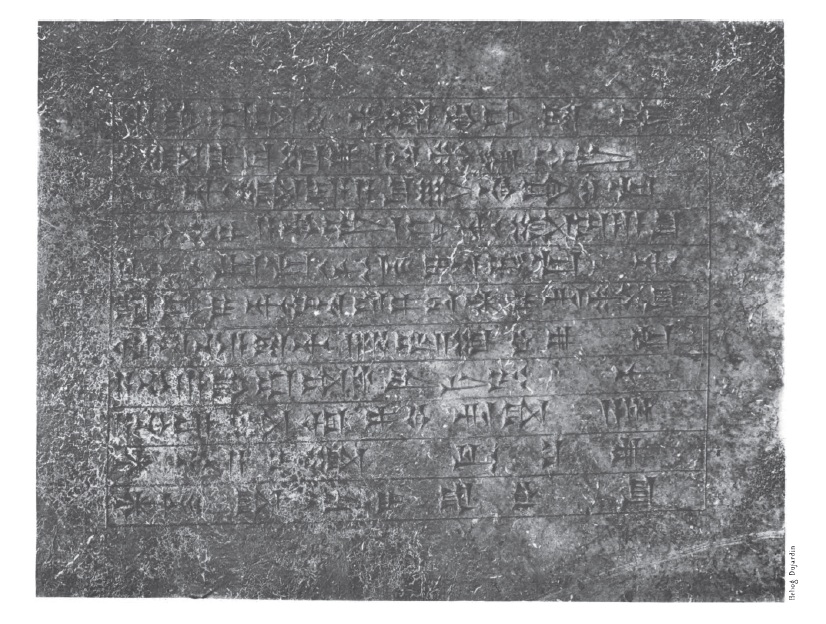
- The Tablet of Akaptaha, recording a gift of land by Babylonian king, Kastiliasu IV
- Created: c. 1230 BC
- Discovered: before 1901; Shush, Khuzestan, Iran

The tablet of Akaptaḫa, or Agaptaḫa, is an ancient Mesopotamian private commemorative inscription on stone of the donation of a 10 GUR field (about 200 acres) by Kassite king Kaštiliašu IV (c. 1232 BC – 1225 BC) to a fugitive leatherworker from Assyrian-occupied Ḫanigalbat in grateful recognition of his services provisioning the Babylonian army with bridles (pagumu, a loanword from Hurrian or perhaps Kassite).

== The tablet ==
The Mitanni kingdom of Ḫanigalbat, here given the Babylonian pronunciation Ḫaligalbatû, had been annexed under the preceding reign of Adad-nārārī I (1307–1275 BC) or Salmānu-ašarēdu I (1274–1245 BC) and Akaptaḫa (a Hurrian name) seems to have been one of the political refugees (munnabittu, 'refugee, displaced person, foreigner') who consequently sought asylum in the Kassite kingdom. He made his home in Padan (var. Padnu), one of the eastern provinces somewhere (Jebel Hamrin, according to Jensen) in the upper Diyala region which had been claimed by the Kassites since the time of Agum II.

The object was recovered during the French excavations at Susa at the end of the 19th century, where it had been taken as war booty during one of the Elamite invasions following the overthrow of Kaštiliašu IV by Tukulti-Ninurta I, those of Kidin-Hutran III (ca. 1224 BC and 1217 BC), Shutruk-Nakhunte (ca. 1158 BC) and Kutir-Nahhunte II (1155 BC).

The tablet describes itself using the same term applied generally to kudurrus as a narû, 'stele', and falls into the same tradition of entitlement monuments, excepting the absence of religious iconography and the format of the granting and cursing formulae. The text invokes "the gods of the king", presumably the Kassite deities Šuqamuna and Šumalia. The inscription uses an informal mix of monumental and cursive cuneiform, precedes the royal name with a masculine (^{1} or ^{m}) rather than the divine (^{DINGIR}) or (^{D}) determinative and spells his name with -ti-li- in place of the more usual –til-, suggesting its provincial origin or perhaps its lack of authenticity.

The name Akaptaḫa appears on four accounts of salaries or ration lists from Nippur as the father of Ninurta-ašarēdu, dated to the sixteenth year of an unnamed king probably Nazi-Maruttaš (1291 BC), the father of Izkur-Šuqamuna, in the twentieth year of an unnamed king, that of Arunayû the twenty-first year of Kurigalzu II and as DUMU-Akaptaḫa on an inventory of gardening implements from Nazi-Maruttaš’ second year but these incidents are probably for someone else as they appear too early.
