= Shagarakti-Shuriash =

Šagarakti-Šuriaš
- King of Babylon
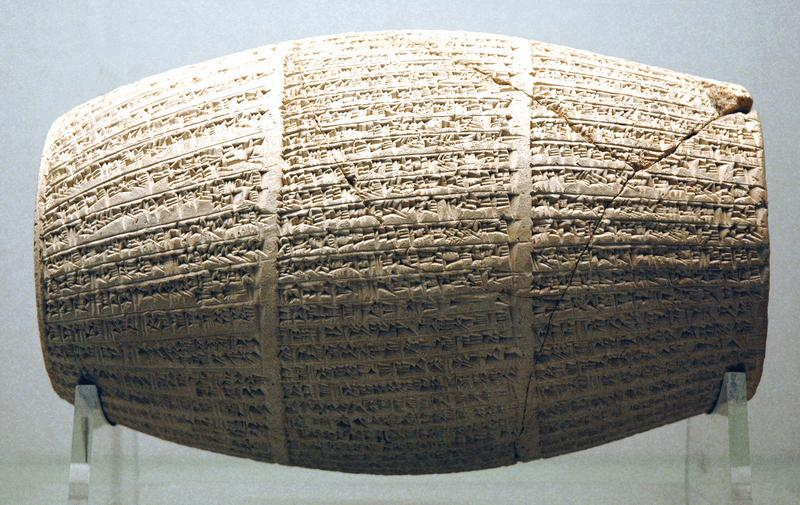
- The Nabonidus Cylinder which names Šagarakti-Šuriaš as builder of the Eulmaš temple.
- Reign: 13 regnal years c. 1245–1233 BC
- Predecessor: Kudur-Enlil
- Successor: Kaštiliašu IV
- House: Kassite

Šagarakti-Šuriaš, written phonetically ša-ga-ra-ak-ti-šur-ia-aš or ^{d}ša-garak-ti-šu-ri-ia-aš in cuneiform or in a variety of other forms, Šuriaš (a Kassite sun god corresponding to Babylonian Šamaš) gives me life, (c. 1245–1233 BC was the twenty seventh king of the Third or Kassite dynasty of Babylon. The earliest extant economic text is dated to the 5th day of Nisan in his accession year, corresponding to his predecessor's year 9, suggesting the succession occurred very early in the year as this month was the first in the Babylonian calendar. He ruled for thirteen years and was succeeded by his son, Kaštiliašu IV. (Note: Babylonian King List A, BM 33332, a broken and badly worn tablet in the British Museum, provides his name in abbreviated form, Šá-ga-rak-[ti-], and the length of his reign.)

== Biography ==
The Babylonian King List A names Kudur-Enlil as his father but there are no confirmatory contemporary inscriptions and the reigns are too short around this period to allow for the genealogy alleged by this king list. He is featured in a fragmentary letter written in later times between the Assyrian king (Tukulti-Ninurta I) and the Hittite king (possibly Suppiluliuma II suggested by Singer). Unfortunately the text is not well preserved and does not name the kings, but the phrase “non-son of Kudur-Enlil” is apparently used to describe the ruler of Babylon, in a passage discussing the genealogy of the Kassite monarchy. Tablets with this rulers name were found at the rural Kassite village of Tell Zubeidi in the upper Diyala River region.

A large inscribed stone, of unusual provenance, was photographed and then lost in Kermānšāh province Iran. It read "One talent, correct (weight), of Rabâ-ša-Adad, ša rēši (official) of Šagarakti-Šuriaš, son of Ku⸣dur -Enlil, king of the world". This would indicate that paternity of this ruler.

=== Economic turbulence ===
More than three hundred economic texts have been found in several caches from Ur, Dur-Kurigalzu, and overwhelmingly Nippur dated to Šagarakti-Šuriaš’ reign. In addition, there are 127 tablets recently published probably recovered from Dūr-Enlilē. They are characterized by the extraordinary variety of spellings used to name this king, who bears a defiantly Kassite title in contrast with his predecessor. Brinkman identifies eighty four permutations, but disputes the suggestion by others that Ātanaḫ-Šamaš was a Babylonianized equivalent adopted to overcome the linguistic problems of the natives. The texts record events such as the hire of slaves, payments in butter to temple servants, and even an agreement to assume a debt for which a priest had been imprisoned. Amīl-Marduk was the Šandabakku or governor of Nippur during his reign, a position he had filled since the earlier reign of Kudur-Enlil. Four tablets obtained on the antiquities market but believed to be from Nippur concern the release of prisoners after a guarantee. They date to the accession year, year 1, and year 2 of Šagarakti-Šuriaš.

It has been suggested that the preponderance of commercial texts detailing debts, loans and slave transactions indicate that Babylonia faced hard economic times during his reign, where people sold themselves into slavery to repay their creditors. One of which (Note: Tablet Ni 2891.) seems to indicate his involvement in the incarceration of an individual while another (Note: Ni 2885.) is a declaration of zakût nippurēti, "freeing of the women of Nippur" as part of a general amnesty. Ini-Tešub, the king of Kargamiš, wrote a letter to him complaining about the activities of the Ahlamu and their effect on communications and presumably trade.

=== The Sippar-Annunītu Eulmaš of Ištar-Annunītu ===
Šagarakti-Šuriaš built the shrine, or Eulmaš, of the warrior goddess Ištar-Annunītu, in the city of Sippar-Annunītu. Nabonidus (556-539 BC), the last king of the Neo-Babylonian Empire, recorded on one of his four foundation cylinders, pictured, that

I excavated, surveyed, and inspected the old foundations of Eulmaš, (Anunitu’s) temple which is in Sippar-Anunitu, which for eight hundred years, since the time of Šagarakti-Šuriaš, king of Babylon, son of Kudur-Enlil, and on the foundation deposit of Šagarakti-Šuriaš, son of Kudur Enlil, I cleared its foundations and laid its brickwork.

— Inscription of Nabonidus, cylinder BM 91124, in the British Museum.

They were actually separated by slightly less than six hundred and eighty years. This is the only other inscription describing Šagarakti-Šuriaš as son of Kudur-Enlil. Another of his cylinders quotes his statue inscription, buried in a trench at the site of the temple:

Šhagarakti-šuriaš, a faithful shepherd, a revered prince, favorite of Šamaš and Anunit - am I. When Šamaš and Anunit, for lordship of the Land mentioned a name, they filled my hands with the leading string of all peoples. At that time Ebarra the temple of Šamaš of Sippar, my lord, and Eulmaš temple of Anunit of Sippar-Anunit, my lady, whose walls since the time of Zabum because of old age had sagged - their walls I demolished. Of their ruined foundations - I took away their earth. Their shrine(s) I preserved. Their plans I retained perfect. I filled in their foundations with earth; the supporting wall(s) I restored. Their walls in their places I embellished. Their appearance I rendered more excellent than before. Forever, O Šamaš and Anunit, because of my precious deeds may your hearts be glad. May they lengthen my days. May they renew (my) life. Days of joy, month(s) of happiness, years of prosperity may they grant (me) as a gift. A judgment of precision and justice may I speak, and may they cause peace to be always.

— Inscription of Nabonidus, cylinder BM 104738, column III, lines 44 to 62.

=== The Seal legend ===
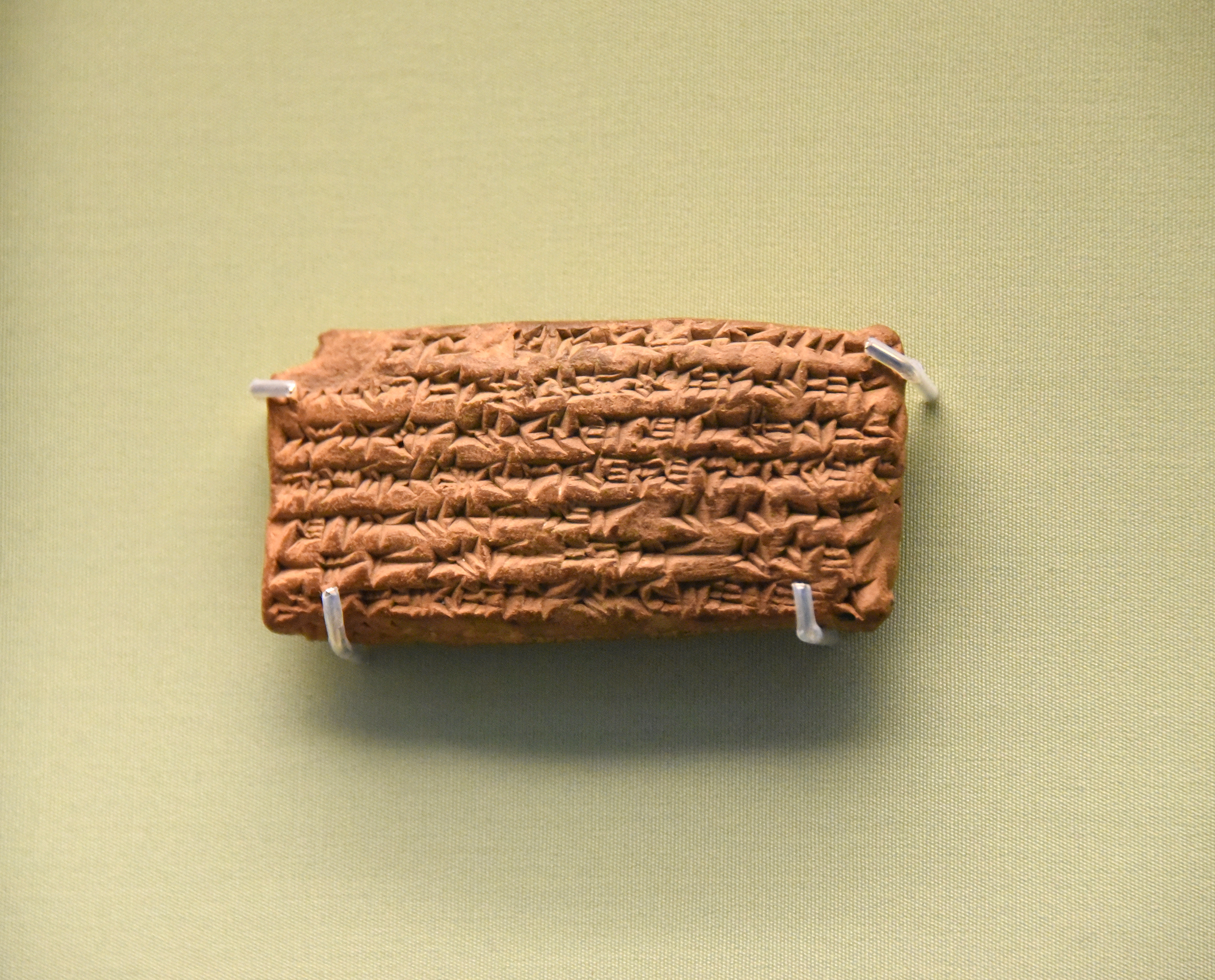
Cuneiform inscriptions found on the lapis lazuli cylinder seal of Shagarakti-Shuriash were recorded on this clay tablet from Nineveh, Iraq. Circa 689 BC. Currently housed in the British Museum in London

A clay tablet from the time of Sennacherib (705–681 BC) quotes a legendary inscription from a lapis lazuli seal. Originally the seal was in the possession of Shagarakti-Shuriash, but was carried off to Nineveh by Tukulti-Ninurta I (1243–1207 BC) as war booty when he sacked Babylon during Kaštiliašu's reign, and he had his own inscription engraved on it without erasing the original. Sometime afterwards the seal again found its way back to Babylon, in circumstances unknown, where it was re-plundered, some six hundred years later by Sennacherib.

"Tukulti-Ninurta, king of the universe, son of Shalmane(ser) (I), king of Assyria: [booty] of Karduniash. As for the one who removes my inscription (and) my name: May Ashur (and) the god Adad destroy his name from the land. This seal from Assyria was given as a gift to Akkad. I, Sennacherib, king of Assyria, after six hundred years conquered Babylon and took it out from the property of Babylon. Property of Shagarakti-Shuriash, king of the universe"

A brick discovered in situ in Nippur has an inscription along its edge which shows that Šagarakti-Šuriaš commissioned work here on the Ekur of Enlil as well.
