= 1250s BC =

The 1250s BC is a decade that lasted from 1259 BC to 1250 BC.

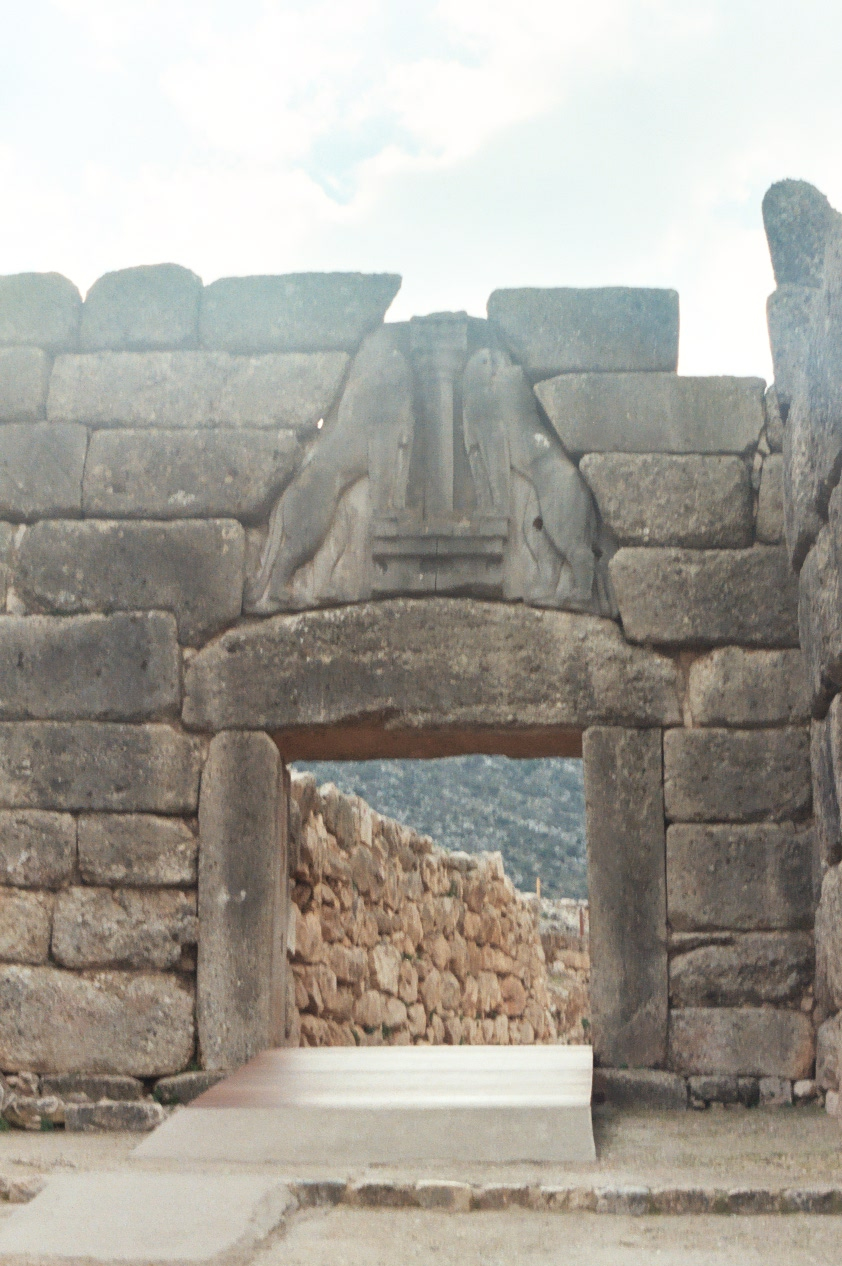
The Lion Gate at Mycenae (full view) – showing the stepped ramp through it

== Events and trends ==
- c. 1259 BC—Ramesses II makes a peace agreement with the Hittites (other date is 1263 BC).
- c. 1258 BC—The Exodus as depicted in the Bible.
- 1251 BC—September 7, a solar eclipse on this date might mark the birth of legendary Heracles at Thebes, Greece.
- 1250 BC—Traditional date of the beginning of the Trojan War.
- c. 1250 BC—Wu Ding, king of the Shang dynasty, and earliest archaeologically confirmed Chinese monarch begins his reign.
- c. 1250 BC—Earliest surviving writing from Ancient China.
- c. 1250 BC—Chariots appear in Ancient China.
- c. 1250 BC—Lion Gate, Mycenae, Greece, are made. Citadel walls are built.
- c. 1250 BC—Papyrus of Ani created, during the 19th dynasty of the New Kingdom of Egypt.
- c. 1250 BC—Tawagalawa letter sent from a Hittite king to a king of the Ahhiyawa

== Significant people ==
- Wu Ding, king of the Shang dynasty.
- Sanchuniathon, Phoenician writer, is born (approximate date).

== Fiction ==
- S.M. Stirling's Nantucket series is set in Bronze Age era, circa the 1250s BC.
