= Shuqamuna and Shumaliya =

Pair of Kassite royal deities

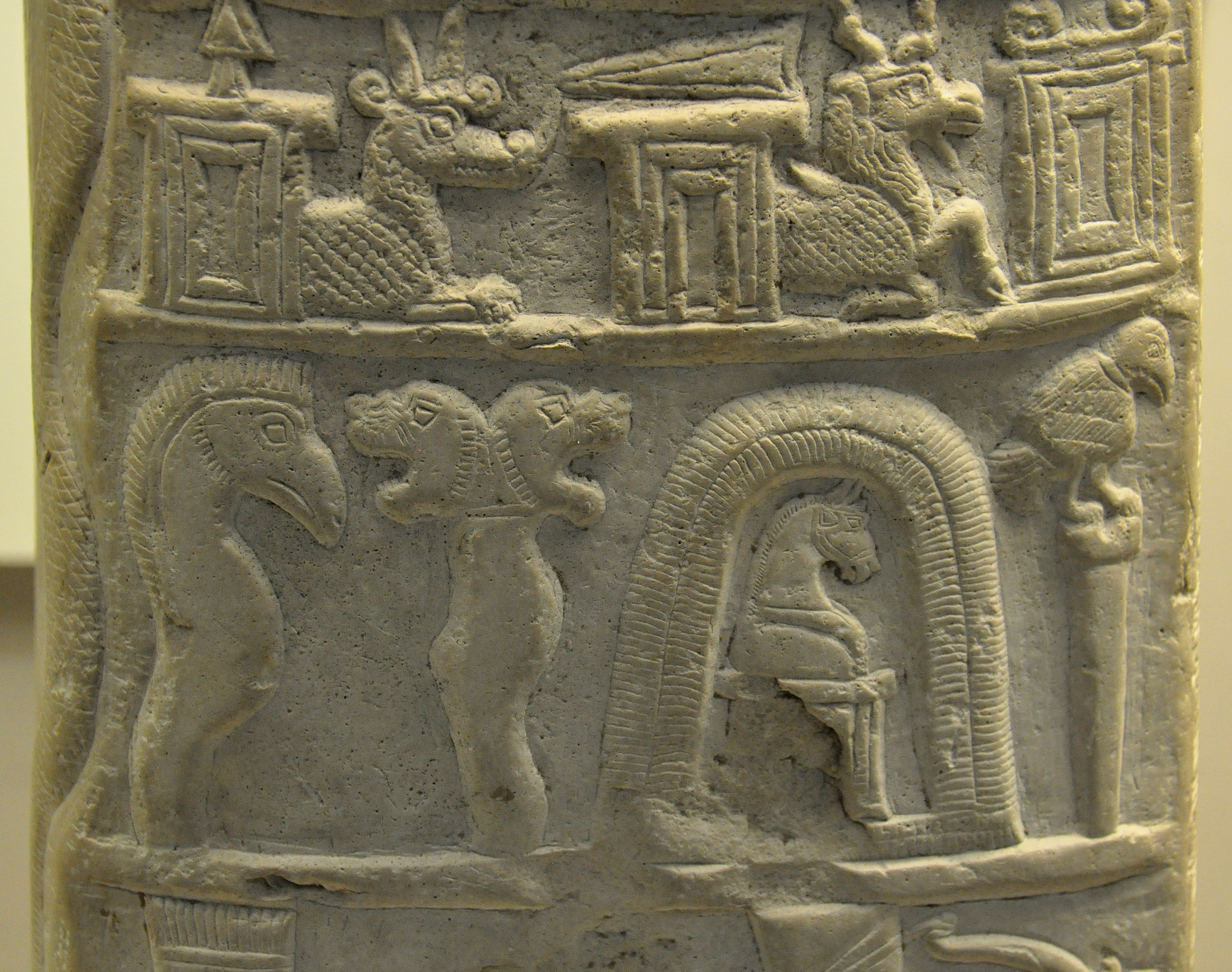
Detail from a Kudurru of Ritti-Marduk, from Sippar, Iraq, 1125–1104 BCE. A perching bird, symbolic of Šuqamuna and Šumaliya, can be seen at the lower right. British Museum.

Šuqamuna (^{d}šu-qa-mu-na) (Note: Alternatively Šugamuna (^{d}šu-ga-mu-na) or Šuqamunu (^{d}šu-qa-mu-nu), see Krebernik & Seidl 2012) and Šumaliya (^{d}šu-ma-li-ia) (Note: Alternatively Šumania (^{d}šu-ma-ni-a), Šugurra (^{d}šu-gur-ra, or Šugab (^{d}šu-gab), see Krebernik & Seidl 2012) were a pair of deities introduced to Mesopotamia during the Kassite dynasty of Babylonia. They had a close association with the royal family; the pair of gods are referred to as 'the gods of the king' (ilu (šá) šarri), with Šuqamuna being the 'king's god' (il šarri) and Šumaliya his patron goddess (lamassi šarri). Šuqamuna and Šumaliya are the only two Kassite gods known to be referenced outside of theophoric personal names and some poorly preserved glossaries, and they are the only ones to consistently receive a divine determinative.

== During the Kassite Period ==
While no archaeological or historical evidence exists for the construction of any temples to Kassite gods in Babylonia, or of their integration into mainstream Babylonian religion, Šuqamuna and Šumaliya appear in several historical texts, inscriptions, and theophoric names, mostly from the middle Kassite period. They were represented iconographically by a bird on a high perch, a symbol which often appeared on Kudurru stones. Despite their importance to the ruling dynasty, neither of these deities appear in the names of any of the Kassite kings or in Babylonian god lists, and they are not mentioned in any of the known dedicatory inscriptions left by Kassite rulers on their building projects.

Agum-Kakrime, a king of 16th-century BCE Babylon, describes himself as being of the 'pure seed' of (i.e., a descendant of) Šuqamuna in an inscription known from two late copies at Nineveh. In the same inscription, Agum claimed to be King of Babylon by the will of the major Babylonian gods, therefore using his descent from Šuqamuna to mark himself as a king outside of the traditional Babylonian aristocracy while fully integrating himself into the religious system. Likewise, Kurigalzu I claimed to have the support of all the gods in his empire, but maintained Šuqamana and Šumaliya as his personal deities.

Text MAH 15922 from the reign of Kurigalzu I centres on the role of Šuqamana and Šumaliya in kingship. The two gods exalt him during his accession, and grant him the rites of kingship; here, as in a fragment from Boğazköy, they are referred to as ilu bānû ("the begetter gods"). This text also refers to a 'temple of Šumaliya and Šuqamuna, the great gods', though this may have been a cultic room or shrine in the palace rather than an independent temple building. This marked a departure from the tradition of investiture at the Temple of Enlil, as the new dynastic gods now conferred kingship upon Babylon's rulers, bringing this source of legitimacy under palace control. However, the Kassite kings certainly did not reject Enlil as a major deity; when Kurigalzu founded his new capital of Dur-Kurigalzu, he chose Enlil as its patron deity and erected a large ziggurat there in the god's honour. Further evidence of the importance of Enlil to the Kassite kings comes from the many dedicatory inscriptions they made to Enlil and their choice to use the title 'governor of Enlil'.

On a 13th-century BCE Kudurru-stone erected by Nazi-Maruttaš, Šuqamuna and Šumaliya appear as part of a formulaic curse inscription. Their names come after those of many of the major Babylonian gods such as Anu, Enlil, and Ishtar, but prior to several other regional gods such as Ishtaran of Der. In column iv lines 21–23, they are described as 'Šuqamuna and Šumaliya, the gods who love each other' (ilānu murtâmū).

Theophoric personal names in the Kassite period did sometimes include Šuqamuna (twelve cases) and Šumaliya (three cases); these frequencies are much lower than that of another Kassite divine name, Saḫ (forty-three cases). However, unlike Saḫ or any other Kassite divine name, theophoric names of Šuqamuna and Šumaliya use the divine determinative.

In a Kassite-Akkadian glossary of names postdating the reign of Šagarakti-Šuriaš, Šuqamuna is glossed as both Nergal and Nusku on the same line. In the same text, Šumaliya is written as Šumaliya in Akkadian, but as Šugurra in Kassite.

== After the Kassite Period ==
Occasional references to Šuqamuna and Šumaliya continue to appear after the end of the dynasty. A Kudurru-stone from the reign of Nebuchadnezzar I in the 12th-century BCE mentions Šumaliya as 'the lady of the bright mountains, who dwells upon the summits, who treads beside the springs'. A small Late Babylonian godlist (CT 24 50) refers to Šuqamuna as marūtuk šá pi-sa-an-nu, 'Marduk of the basket'.

The Aššur-Babylon A text of Esarhaddon, found in a set of clay tablets from Nineveh, describes how he restored a number of tutelary deities to their sanctuaries, including 'the gods Ḫumḫumiya, Šuqamuna, (and) Šimaliya [to] Sippar-Aruru' in the 7th-century BCE.

A male deity named Kaššu (^{d}kaš-šu-ú) begins to appear alone and in theophoric names after the Kassite period, along with a female deity Kaššitu (^{d}kaš-ši-tu). These names likely refer to Šuqamana and Šumaliya, who may have become stereotyped as a result of increasing marginalisation of the Kassites.
