= Qasr Shemamok =

Archaeological site in Iraq

- Kilizu
- Location within Iraq
- 36°6′19″N 43°45′9″E
- Type: settlement
- Periods: Late Bronze Age, Iron Age, Parthian, Sassanian
- Location: Erbil Governorate, Iraq

History
- Built: 2nd millennium BC

Site notes
- Excavation dates: 1850, 1933, 2011-2020
- Archaeologists: Austen H. Layard, Giuseppe Furlani, Olivier Rouault, Maria Grazia Masetti-Rouault
- Condition: Ruined
- Owner: Public
- Public access: Yes

Qasr Shemamok (also Qasr Shamamuk and earlier Kasr of Shomamok) is an ancient Near East archaeological site about 30 kilometers south of modern Erbil (ancient Arbela, possibly ancient Urbilum) in Erbil Governorate, in the Kurdistan Region of Iraq on the west bank of the Shiwazor river. It is about 25 kilometers from the ancient site of Nimrud. Remains at the site date mainly to the Hurrian, Middle Assyrian, Neo-Assyrian, Parthian, and Sassanian times. Under the Assyrians, it was named Kilizu (or Kakzu or even Kilizi) and was a provincial capital. It is not far from the ancient sites of Kurd Qaburstan (possibly ancient Qabra), Tell Halawa, Tell Aliawa, and Tell Baqrta (which reached 80 hectares in the Early Bronze Age).

== Archaeology ==
The main tell is about 20 hectares in area and rises about 30 meters above the plain. It is cut by a gully on the northeast, which it thought to be the position of the ancient gate. A lower town, today almost completely under irrigated cultivation, extends to the south of the tell and covers about 50 hectares. The area inside the Neo-Assyrian period city wall is about 50 hectares. The area outside the main site also shows signs of occupation. The southernmost part of the site lies under a modern village. There are bomb craters on the top of the tell, in the Area A-West excavation area, from the 2003 invasion of Iraq.

The site, then known as Kasr of Shomamok, was visited by Austen H. Layard in 1850, noting it was surrounded by an embankment and was divided into two parts by a ravine or ancient watercourse. He reported that a local sheik had been excavating at the site and "had opened several deep trenches and tunnels in the mound, and had discovered chambers, some with walls of plain sundried bricks, others paneled round the lower part with slabs of reddish limestone, about 3 or 4 feet high. He had also found inscribed bricks, with an inscription declaring that Sennacherib had here built a city, or rather palace. Layard examined a high point about two miles from Shemamok, which appeared to have been topped by a "castle" of Sennacherib.

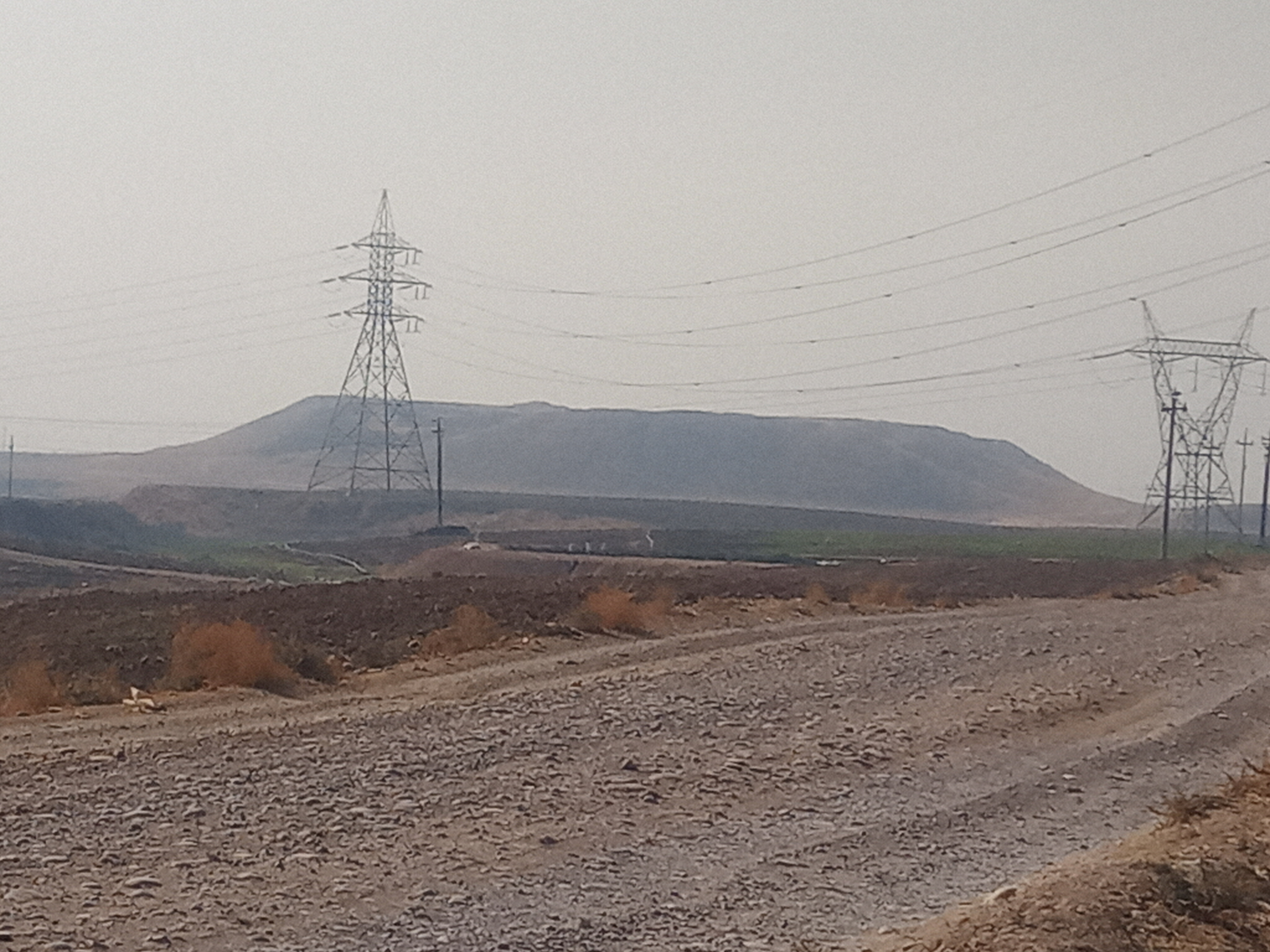
Site of Qasr Shemamok

In 1933 an Italian team led by Giuseppe Furlani excavated in Qasr Shemamok, at the tell and the lower town. They dated the city wall to the Neo-Assyrian period and confirmed the identification as ancient Kilizu/Kilizi/Kakzu based on Neo-Assyrian brick inscriptions. A large Middle Assyrian, Neo-Assyrian, and Parthian necropolis found west of the mound, 42 burials in all, was excavated. Excavation finds, including, cylinder seals, bead, pottery vases, iron objects, terracotta figurines and two large sarcophagi were divided between the Archaeological Museum of Florence and the Baghdad Museum. The status of the latter objects is unclear.

In 2011, a University of Lyon and Harvard University team led by Olivier Rouault and Maria Grazia Masetti-Rouault started working at the site, beginning with a surface survey. They then excavated a 68-meter-long by 5-meter-wide trench (Area A-East) beginning at the top of the tell (where several deposits of live machine gun ammunition were found) and bearing south through the lower town. A monumental ramp was encountered, constructed from baked bricks, some of which bore an inscription of the Neo-Assyrian ruler Sennacherib (705–681 BC). A clay nail of the Middle Assyrian ruler Arik-den-ili (c. 1317–1306 BC) was found. A second excavation, Area B, was later opened on the northeastern part of the site. Small finds included fragments of cuneiform tablets. In the northern part of the tell a palace of Middle Assyrian ruler Adad-nirari I (c. 1305–1274 BC) was found with in situ inscribed floor bearing his name. Beneath that layer, in Area A-East, were found Hurrian cuneiform tablets and a foundation document of a Hurrian ruler.

From 2012 to 2020 the Erbil Plain Archaeological Survey used satellite photographs, drone photogrammetry, and surface collection to establish occupation patterns at number of sites in the region, including Qasr Shemamok. Surface finds and satellite image analysis suggests that there was a 30 hectare industrial area in a northern extension to the site. The survey identified a large number of archaeological sites in the area around Qasr Shemamok.

In 2015, a local turned a cuneiform tablet (QS04b), later termed the "Terjan tablet", into the Erbil Museum. Based on similar fragments found in the Late Bronze levels of the citadel, its provenance was determined to be Qasr Shemamok, dating to before the Middle Assyrian period. The tablet turned out to be a foundation tablet of the ruler Irišti-enni (a hybrid Akkadian-Hurrian name), son of Shir-enni, and marked the rebuilding of the city wall of Tu’e in the "land of Kunsihhe". It was dedicated to the storm god DINGIR.ISHKUR "who loves Tu’e". Later excavations found the earlier wall, measuring 9 meters in width and fronted by a ditch.

A shabti (Egyptian funerary statue) fragment of the 'king-mother' Udjashu from the Thirtieth Dynasty of Egypt was found at Qasr Shemamok. A sikkatu (inscribed wall peg) of Assur-dan II (c. 934–912 BC) was found at the site.

== History ==
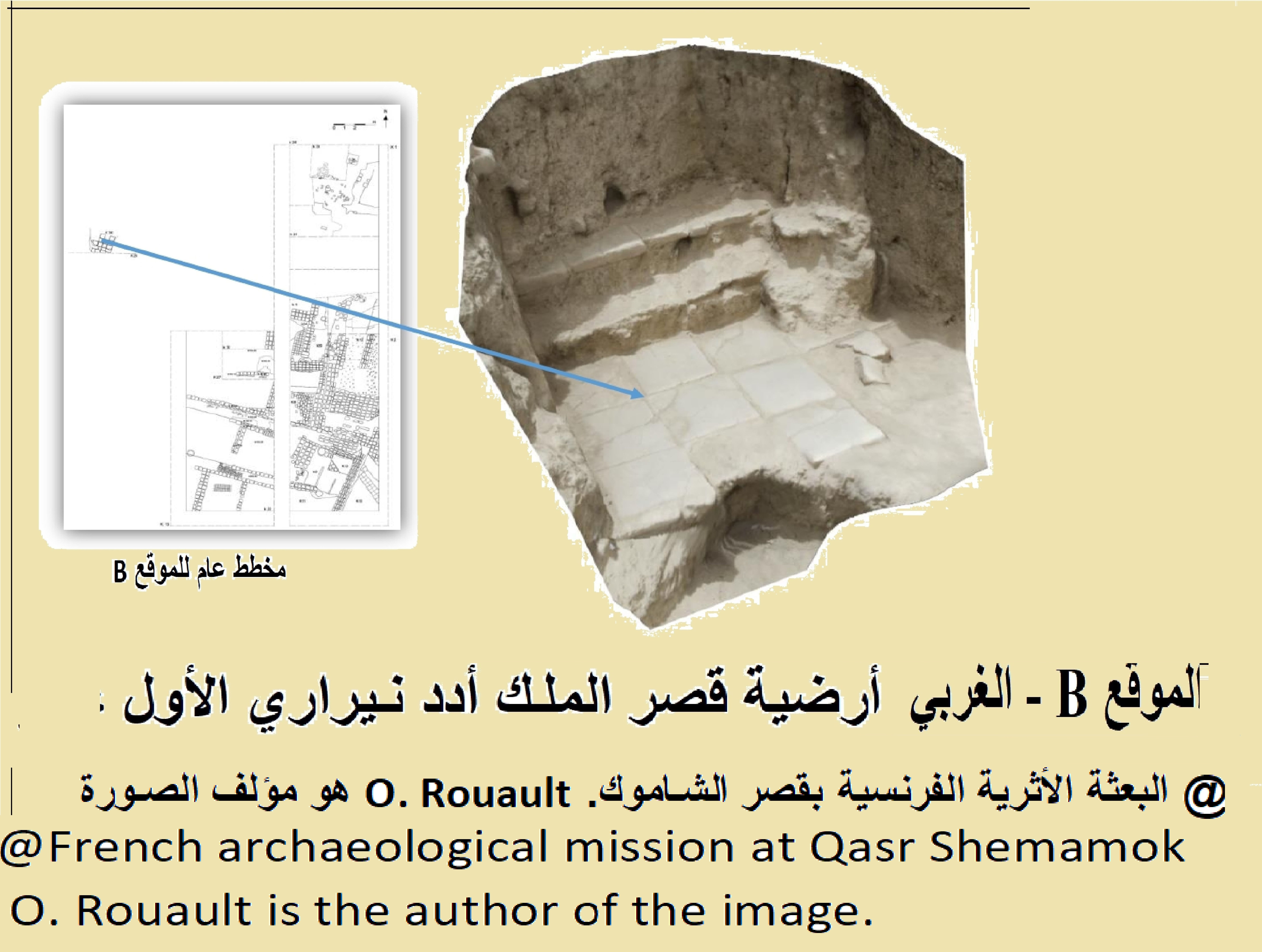
Remains of a palace built by Adad-nirari I in Qasr Shemamok hill in Erbil

Occupation at the site was light from the Hassuna, Halaf, Uruk, Ninivite V, Early Dynastic, Old Babylonian, through the Middle Bronze period. In the early portion of the Late Bronze period the site was under Hurrian influence, possibly as part of the Mitanni Empire. After that, in Middle Assyrian times, a 50-hectare city grew at the site and became Kilizu, capital of the Assyrian Kilizu province. Occupation continued into the Neo-Assyrian period and later during Parthian, Hellenistic, and Sassanian times (restricted to the 6-hectare citadel area, the tell).

The name of a governor of Kilizi from the reign of Ninurta-apal-Ekur (c. 1191–1179 BC) was "Ibassi-ilı ̄son of Assur-musallim". The city is mentioned in the Assyrian Eponym Chronicle. In 704 it reads "T[o ...] the cities Larak, Sarrabanu, [...]; the palace of the city Kilizi was built; ... in [...]; nobles against the Kulummians.". The eponym of year 703 is "Nusha[ya, governor of the city Kilizi]".

== See also ==
- Cities of the ancient Near East
- List of archaeological sites in Erbil Governorate
