= Kadashman-Turgu =

Kadašman-Turgu
- King of Babylon
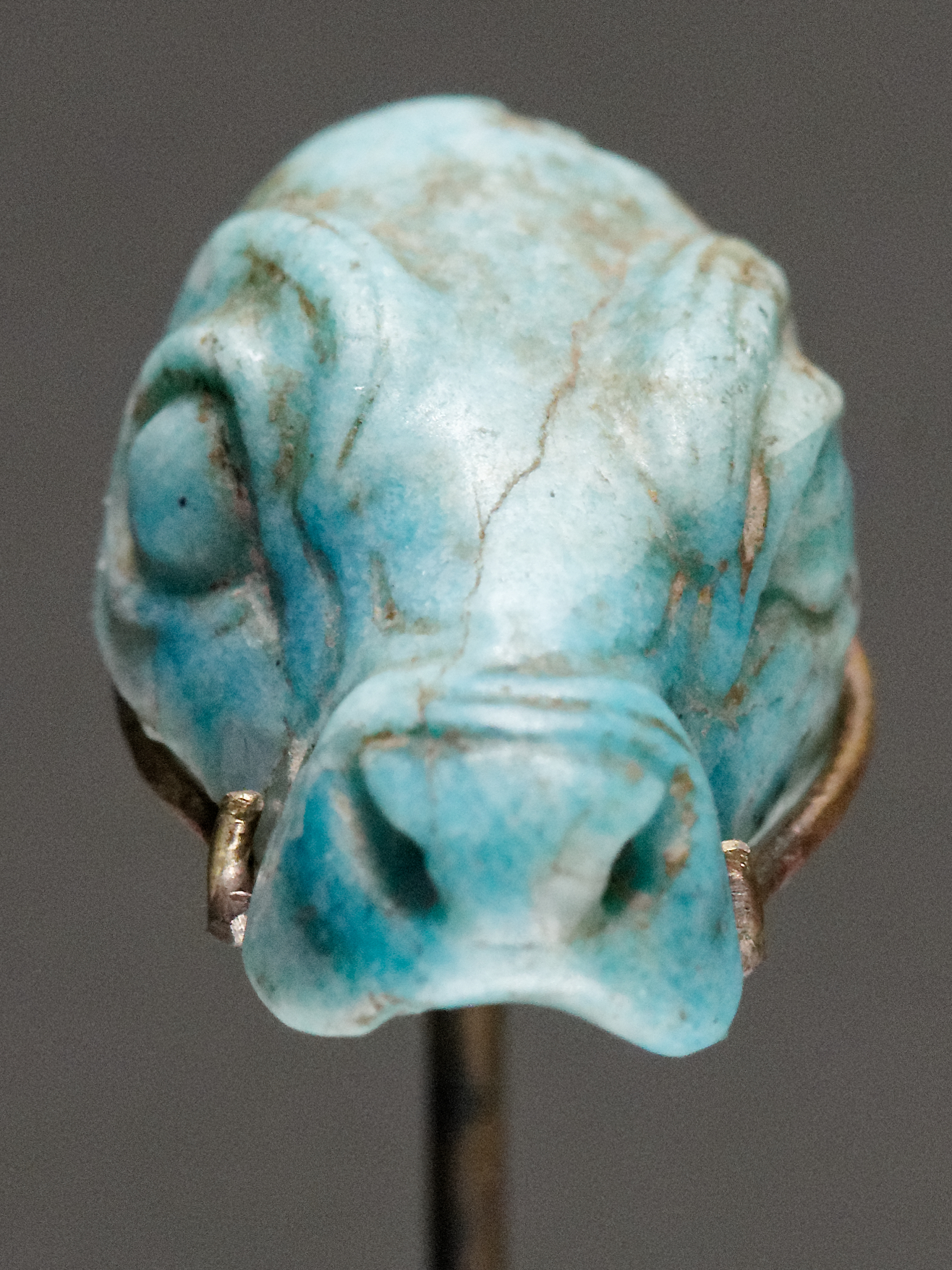
- Zoomorph amulet (Note: AO 4633 Small horse-head figure with blue glaze inscribed "Ka-da-aš-ma-an Túr-gu, LUGAL ŠÁR.") with an inscription in the name of Kadashman-Turgu, Louvre Museum
- Reign: 18 regnal years c. 1281–1264 BC
- Predecessor: Nazi-Maruttaš
- Successor: Kadašman-Enlil II
- House: Kassite

Kadašman-Turgu, inscribed Ka-da-aš-ma-an Túr-gu and meaning he believes in Turgu, a Kassite deity, (c. 1281–1264 BC) was the 24th king of the Kassite or 3rd dynasty of Babylon. He succeeded his father, Nazi-Maruttaš, continuing the tradition of proclaiming himself “king of the world” and went on to reign for eighteen years. (Note: According to the Kinglist A tablet, BM 33332, column 2, line 3, in the British Museum, but note the name is mostly obliterated.) He was a contemporary of the Hittite king Ḫattušili III, with whom he concluded a formal treaty of friendship and mutual assistance, and also Ramesses II with whom he consequently severed diplomatic relations.

== Reign ==
Kadašman-Turgu reigned during momentous times, but seems to have played only a peripheral role. Ḫattušili III, in a letter (Note: Letter from Ḫattušili III to Kadašman-Enlil II, Bo 1802 KBo 1:10 r52: šarru ša giš.tukul.hi.a.iššaknūma [uššabu], “A king who sat home when there is a war.”) to his son and successor Kadašman-Enlil II, said of him, “they used to call [your father] a king who prepares for war but then stays at home”. His personal seal (Note: VAT 9672 tablet with seal impression recovered from Assur.) included suckling animals in two registers, allegorically symbolizing his care for his subjects. The continued employment of the extinct Sumerian language in royal votive inscriptions was in decline and the Babylonian calendar was under revision with the introduction of the Akkadian term: Šanat rēš šarrūti, “accession year.” (Note: Tablet Ni.435 from Nippur)

=== Relations with Assyria ===
Early in his reign, he brokered a treaty with the Assyrian king Adad-Nīrāri, preserved on a fragmentary clay tablet (Note: Tablet VAT 15420.) where the phrase “he pardoned his son of the crime” (Note: Fragment VAT 14400 copy of VAT 15420: mar-šu i-na hi-ti u-zak-ki, “he pardoned his son for the crime.”) appears twice. Kadašman-Turgu’s father, Nazi-Maruttaš had been engaged in a protracted war with both Adad-Nīrāri and his father Arik-den-ili which had reached its dénouement in a battle at "Kār-Ištar of Ugarsallu". (Note: Synchronistic Chronicle (ABC 21) tablet C, column 1, lines 24 to 31) This settlement perhaps explains why there were no reports of any conflict between the Babylonians and Assyrians during this time. It also freed the Assyrians to turn their attention to conquering their westerly neighbor and former overlord the Mitanni.

=== The Hittite succession ===
He would no doubt have been aware of the Battle of Kadesh, in 1274, the dramatic climax of the Hittite conflict with Egypt and probably the largest chariot battle ever fought. The Hittite king Muwatalli II died around 1272 and was succeeded by his son, Urḫi-Teššup, who took the name Mursili III, and reigned for seven years. (Note: Apology of Ḫattušili III §11, “I submitted for seven years”.) But he found himself increasingly at odds with his uncle, Ḫattušili III, the heroic general of Kadesh, who eventually overthrew him. In the first instance, Urḫi-Teššup seems to have appealed to Kadašman-Turgu for support, (Note: Apology of Ḫattušili III, §12, IV 34–5, “He would have plotted another plot, and driven to the land of Babylon, but when I heard the matter, I seized him, and I sent him to the sea coast.”) before turning to the Assyrians and finally seeking asylum at the court of Ramesses.

First, Ḫattušili demanded the handover of the fugitive. Then he sought support from Kadašman-Turgu complaining of the pharaoh's lack of complicity. Kadašman-Turgu was apparently sympathetic and willing to recognize the usurper as Hatti's legitimate king, motivated perhaps more by the need for a strong alliance with the Hittites to counter the threat of the Assyrians and maintain the uneasy peace. He promised to provide Ḫattušili with military support in any conflict with Egypt and “kept the messenger of the king of Egypt at bay”, i.e. terminated diplomatic links. According to Ḫattušili, they agreed that “the survivor shall protect the children of the one who goes first to his fate”.

Relations must have warmed for at least a short time, before Kadašman-Turgu died, because Ḫattušili records in a letter to Kadašman-Enlil that his father loaned to the Hittite the services of a sculptor, who was subsequently returned. He had earlier loaned a physician named Rabâ-ša-Marduk and an exorcist to Ḫattušili’s brother Muwatalli II ("as for the exorcist about whom my brother wrote me, saying 'the exorcist whom my brother wrote me has arrived […] and has begun the ritual'” (Note: Kadašman-Turgu letter to Ḫattušili III (tablet Bo 6358 / KUB 3:71 / CTH 174) (Vorderasiatisches Museum, Berlin))) but these experts were never returned ("perhaps the exorcist has died").

=== Domestic affairs ===
His construction efforts are witnessed at the E’igi-kalama ziggurat of the tutelary deity Lugalmarada, in the city of Marad, and also in the ziggurat area at Nippur. A single lapis lazuli bead inscribed with the name of Kadašman-Turgu was found during the excavation of the Ekur temple at Nippur. A single tablet dated to year 4 of Kadašman-Turgu was found in the main palace area at Dur-Kurigalzu.

The eighteen-year reign is confirmed by progression of date formulae appearing on more than a hundred economic texts, such as those of Irîmshu-Ninurta, a prominent official in Nippur, who recorded ten storehouse transactions, from Kadašman-Turgu’s reign, to that of his successor, his son Kadašman-Enlil II, in which he receives incoming taxes, he grants loans, and pays salaries to other officers.

==== Chronological problems ====
An economic text, first published in 1982 by Veysel Donbaz, has presented a chronological dilemma regarding the sequence of succession from Kadašman-Turgu to Kadašman-Enlil as it seems to place Kadašman-Enlil’s succession year in the past whilst describing events too recent to be explained by harking back to the earlier monarch, Kadašman-Enlil I, whose reign ended 90 years before the date (1270 BC) on this document. It describes the exchange of goods and real estate between Kidin-Gula and his son Martuku with Arad-Marduk. It provides the following heading at the start and a similar summary at the end:

From the month Tašrītu of the accession year of Kadašman-Enlil to the twelfth year of Kadašman-Turgu, king. (Note: Tablet A.1998 A. (= Bab 39031): ul-tu ITI.DU_{6}.KÙ ša MU.SAG NAM.LUGAL Ka-daš-man-^{d}EN-LÍL a-di MU.12.KÁM Ka-daš-man-Túr-gu LUGAL.)

— A.1998, lines 2–4

Brinkman argues that the evidence for the traditional sequence, i.e. votive inscriptions of Kadašman-Enlil, son of Kadašman-Turgu and other contemporary documents, “is too strong simply to set aside.” In contrast, Boese suggests another Kadašman-Enlil may have briefly preceded the pair. The text comes from the archive of Itti-Ezida-lummir in Babylon (Pedersén M8) which also contains a text that may be from the 10th year of Kadašman-Ḫarbe II, (Note: Bab 39045.) a king recorded as having only reigned for less than 2 years, and, for this reason, Werner Nahm suggests they are both ancient fabrications. The title to real estate pledged as security to debt valued in copper, rather than the gold or silver citations of the period, reflects a later era after 1175 BC, when the trade routes for these precious metals had been compromised and supports doubts about its authenticity.
