= Battle of Kār Ištar =

Ancient battle

- Part of Assyrian-Kassite Wars
Date	c. 1280 BC
Location	Kār Ištar
Result	Assyrian victory

Belligerents
Assyria	Kassite Babylonia

Commanders and leaders
Adad-nirari I	Nazi-Maruttash

Strength
Unknown	Unknown

Casualties and losses
Unknown	Unknown, likely higher

The Battle of Kār Ištar was fought between Assyria and the Kassites of Babylon sometime during the reign of Assyrian king Adad-nirari I.

Under the reign of Assyrian King Ashur-uballit I, the Assyrians destroyed Mitanni, a kingdom in northern Mesopotamia that had dominated Assyria politically since the 1450s BCE. Ashur-uballit's victory allowed Assyria to become the Middle Assyrian Empire, a major Mespotamian power. This put them on a crash course with the major city of southern Mesopotamia, Babylon, currently ruled by the Kassite Peoples. Ashur-Uballit waged war with the Babylonians, defeating them and taking much territory. However this dominance appears to have been lost as Adad-nirari I recalls how his father (Arik-den-ili) "could not rectify the calamities inflicted by the king of the Kassite Lands". When Adad-nirari took the throne he inherited this war with Babylon. He met the Babylonian King Nazi-Maruttash in battle at Kār Ištar and the Assyrians gained a decisive victory. Adad-nirari I subsequently conquered Pilasqu, Arman and Lullumu. Nazi Maruttaš' successor Kadashman-Turgu then signed a peace with Adad Nirari which would create a new Assyro-Babylonian border. After a while of peace the two states would go to war again, but Assyria now had the advantage, capturing Babylon on multiple occasions. The two states would remain at war on and off for the next 675 years, until the destruction of the last Assyrian army at the Battle of Carchemish by Neo-Babylonian king Nebuchadnezzar II.
