= Dur-Kurigalzu =

Archaeological site in Iraq

- عَقَرْقُوف
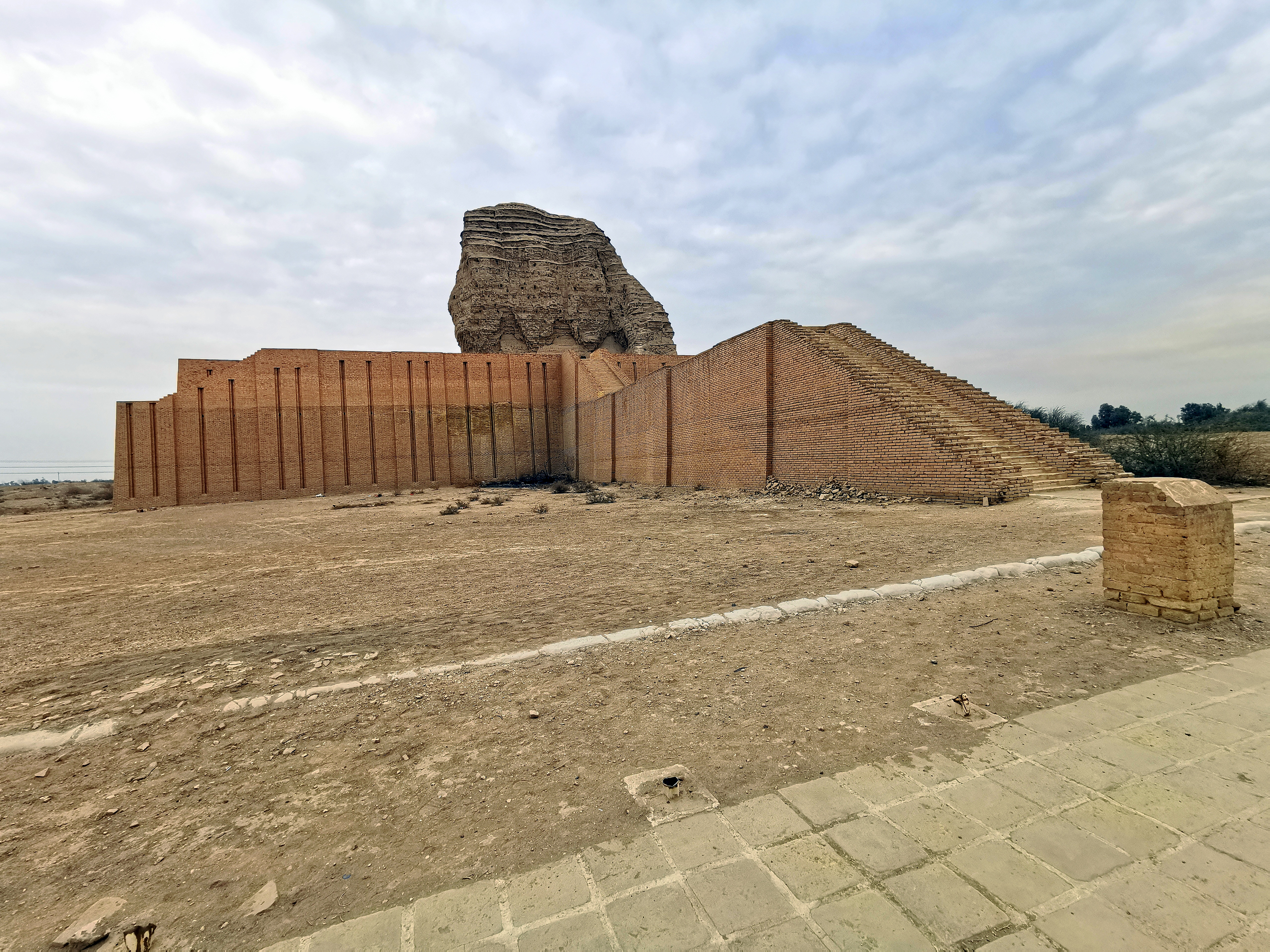
- The ziggurat of Dur-Kurigalzu, December 2021

- Location within Iraq
- 33°21′13″N 44°12′8″E
- Type: tell
- Location: Baghdad Governorate, Iraq
- Region: Mesopotamia

Site notes
- Area: 225 ha (560 acres)
- Excavation dates: 1942–1945
- Archaeologists: Taha Baqir, S. Lloyd

Dur-Kurigalzu (modern `Aqar-Qūf عَقَرْقُوف in Baghdad Governorate, Iraq) was a city in southern Mesopotamia, near the confluence of the Tigris and Diyala rivers, about 30 kilometres (19 mi) west of the center of Baghdad. It was founded by a Kassite king of Babylon, Kurigalzu I (died c. 1375 BC) and was abandoned after the fall of the Kassite dynasty (c. 1155 BC). The city was of such importance that it appeared on toponym lists in the funerary temple of the Egyptian pharaoh, Amenophis III (c. 1351 BC) at Kom el-Hettan". The prefix Dur is an Akkadian term meaning "fortress of", while the Kassite royal name Kurigalzu is believed to have meant "shepherd of the Kassites". The tradition of naming new towns Dur dates back to the Old Babylonian period with an example being Dūr-Ammī-ditāna. The city contained a ziggurat and temples dedicated to Mesopotamian gods, as well as a royal palace which covered 420,000 square meters.

The ziggurat at Aqar Quf, standing to a height of about 52 metres (171 ft), has been a very visible ancient monument for centuries. For camel caravans and modern road traffic, the ziggurat has served as a signal of the near approach to Baghdad. Because of Aqar Quf's easy accessibility and close proximity to the city of Baghdad, it has been one of Iraq's most visited and best-known sites. The ziggurat was often confused with the Tower of Babel by Western visitors to the area from the 17th century onwards.

== History ==
=== Late Bronze Age ===
The town of Dur Kurigalzu was founded by the Kassite King Kurigalzu I in the early 14th century BC and is situated along an east–west-trending limestone ridge between the Euphrates and Tigris rivers. Until the last century, the adjacent Aqar Quf depression would have been inundated with flood water part of the year. This site had access to fresh water from the Euphrates by means of the Isa Canal, known as the Patti-Enlil Canal in ancient times. The city functioned as the capital of Babylonia during the reign of Kurigalzu, and either as the capital or at least an important city during the period after. It was occupied continuously until the fall of the Kassite Dynasty in the 12th century BC when it was largely abandoned.

==== Ziggurat ====
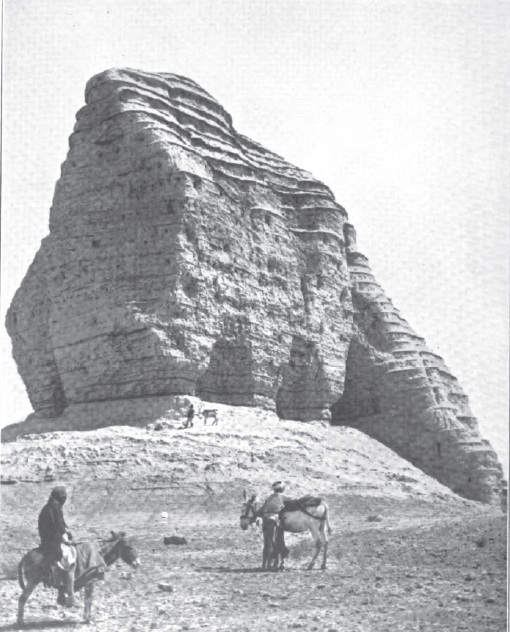
The Ziggurat of Dur-Kurigalzu (1915).

The Ziggurat of Dur-Kurigalzu, built in the early 14th century BC by Kurigalzu I, is located in the city's western area and is devoted to the chief Babylonian God Enlil, who Sumerians believed to govern over wind, air, earth, and storm.

The ziggurat's base measures 69m x 67m and it was constructed of large, well-tempered liben with many stamped baked bricks incorporated into the structure, bearing the name of Kurigalzu and his dedication of the temple E-U-GAL to Enlil. Facing the front, the Ziggurat can be approached from three main staircases leading up to the first level. Standing upright on the level withholds a terraced compound, built by layers of receding levels. At its core, there are consistent sun-dried square bricks with reed mats placed in every seven layers of brick to help hold the structure altogether. An axial flight of steps was discovered running outwards from the center of the side of the ziggurat towards the temple-complex and was built of solid kiln-baked brick set in bitumen.

=== Iron Age and later ===
The temple area, at least, was known to be active in the 7th century BC and in the Neo-Babylonian period. Up until recently (mostly between the 9th and 14th centuries AD), there have been smaller occupations at parts of Aqar Quf, with areas of the site being used for burials and for Arab settlement. It has been suggested that in earlier times the site was named Esâ.

== Archaeology ==
In Kassite times the area was defined by a wall that enclosed about 425 hectares (1,050 acres). The wall, originally built by Kurigalzu I, was later rebuilt by Kurigalzu II (c. 1332—1308 BC). The site has several defined areas, Mound A (100 meters south of the ziggurat), Tell Ahmar, Tell Abu Shijar, Tell al-Abyadh, and a private housing area. The main elements, ziggurat, palaces, etc. are all within the city wall. The currently known structures of the site consist of nine temples (T1 to T9), with T1 being the ziggurat and associated temple to Enlil, three palaces (P1 to T3), and five housing areas (H1 to H5)

The site was visited by Bengt Bengtsson Oxenstierna in 1616. Agar Quf first appeared on a modern map by Edward Ives in 1773. The site was then described by Claudius James Rich in 1811. Aqar Quf (referred to then as Akerkuf, Agger Koof, or Akar-kuf) was visited and examined in 1837 by Francis Rawdon Chesney. The name of Dur-Kurigalzu was identified by Henry Rawlinson in the mid-19th century.

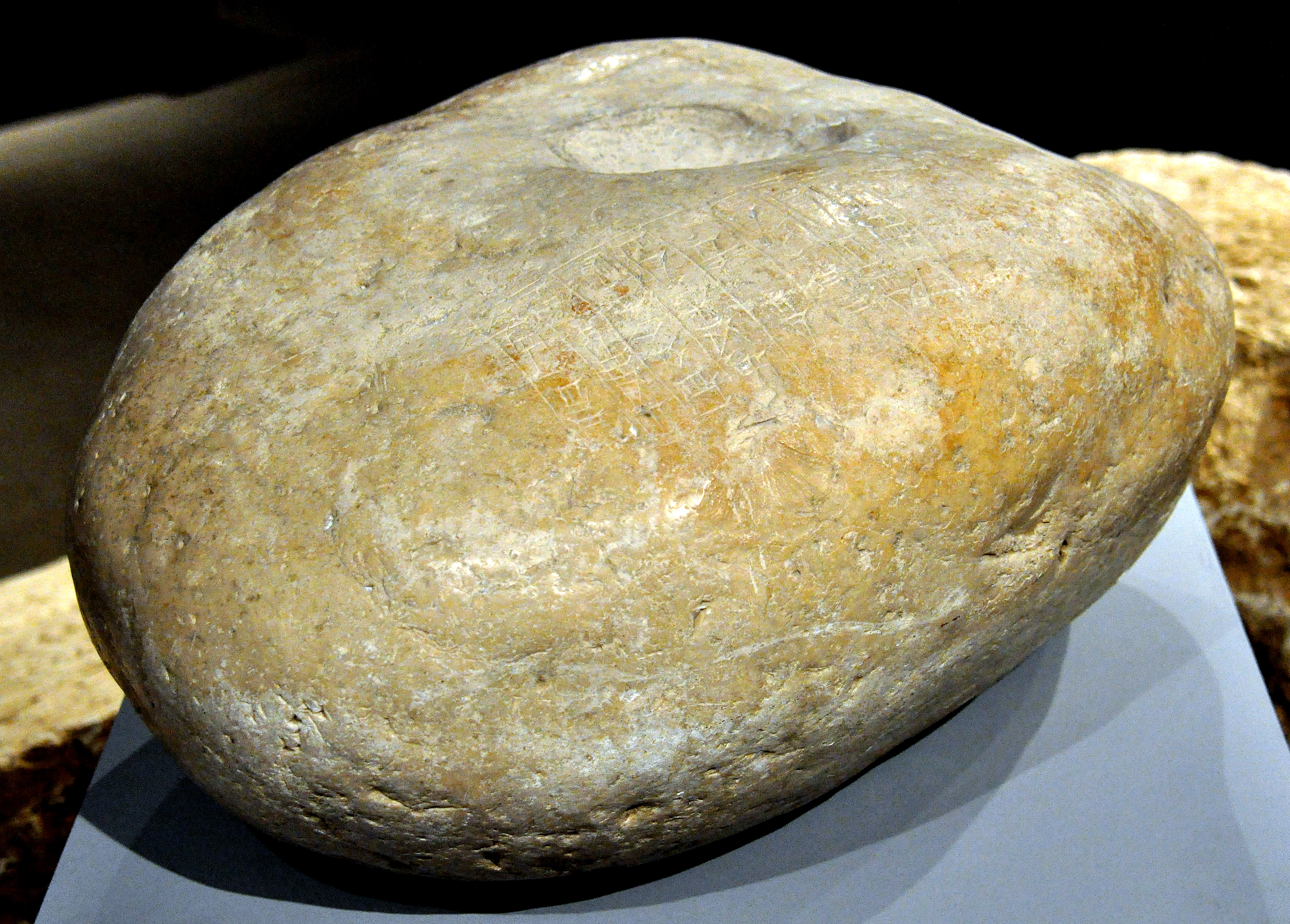
Door socket from Tell-el-'Abyad at Aqar-Quf mentioning the name of king Kurigalzu and his palace (E-GAL-KI-SAR-RA), Sulaymaniyah Museum, Iraq

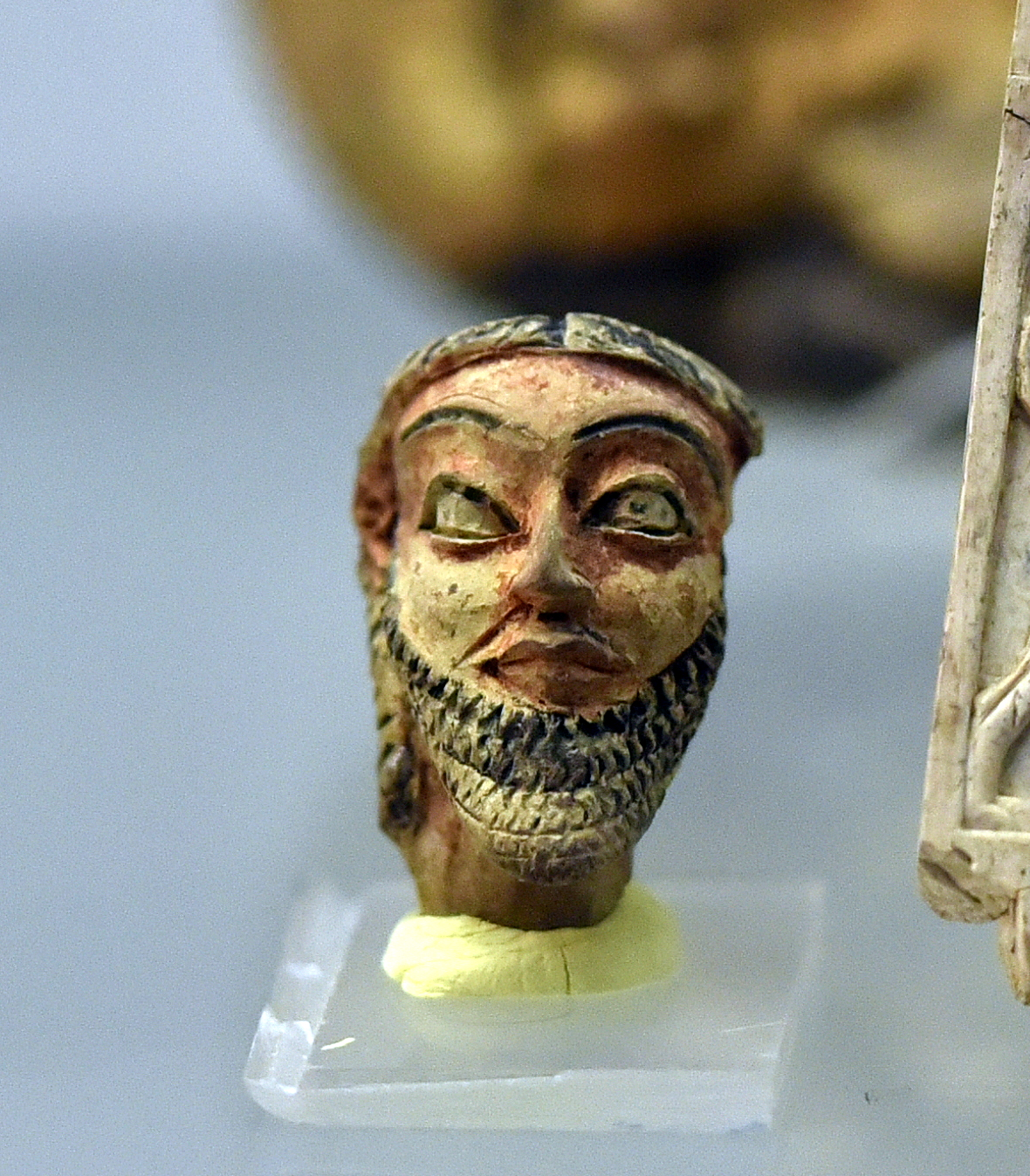
Male head from Dur-Kurigalzu, Iraq, reign of Marduk-apla-iddina I. Iraq Museum.

Excavations were conducted from 1942 through 1945, by Taha Baqir and Seton Lloyd in a joint excavation by the Iraqi Directorate-General of Antiquities and the British School of Archaeology in Iraq. Over 100 cuneiform tablets of the Kassite period were recovered, now in the Iraq Museum. Some were date-able to the reigns of Burna-Buriash II and Kashtiliash IV. They also showed that two of the palaces were named the Palace of the Mountain Sheep and the Palace of the Stag. A kudurru (IM 49991) dated to year five of Kassite ruler Nazi-Maruttash was also found. During the excavation, 5 fragments of a larger-than-life-size statue were discovered. They contain the longest yet found Kassite Sumerian inscriptions. A baked brick pavement (T5) around two kilometers northwest of Tell al-Abyadh was found to be covered with hundreds of broken terracotta figurines dedicated to the god Gula. Bricks found in situ were dated to the reign of Kassite ruler Nazi-Maruttash. The excavations included the ziggurat, three temples, and part of the palace of Dur-Kurigalzu II.

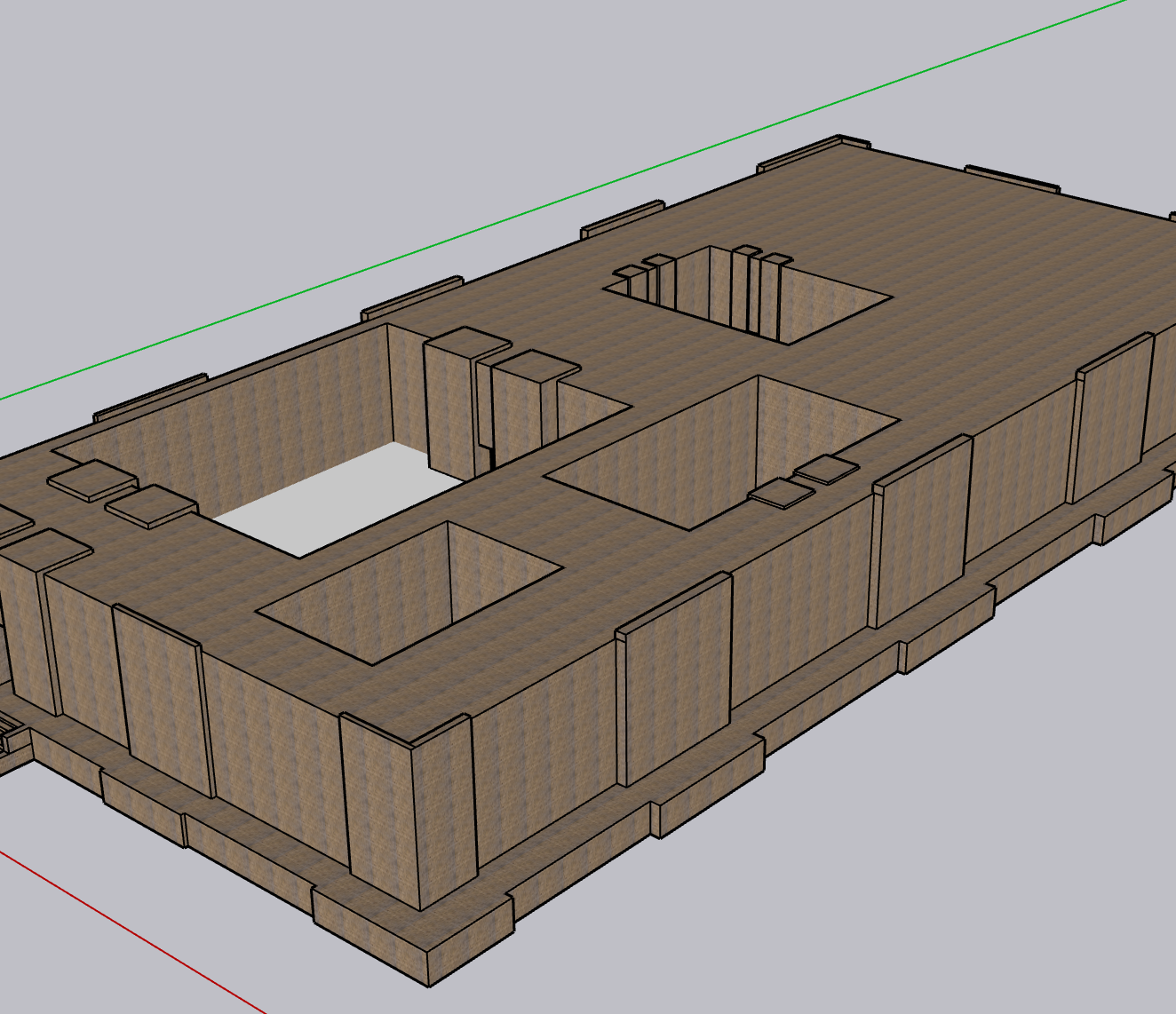
3-D reconstruction of the remains of the main palatial complex in Dur-Kurigalzu.

In the early 1960s and from 1968 to 1975 the Iraqi Directorate-General of Antiquities continued to do some excavation around the ziggurat as part of a restoration project under Saddam Hussein The three excavated areas are the mound of Aqar Quf (including the ziggurat and large temple), a public building (approximately 100 metres (330 ft) to the west), and Tell al-Abyadh where a large palace was partially uncovered (about 1 kilometre (0.62 mi) to the south-west). Several burned cuneiform tablets dated to the reign of Marduk-apla-iddina I were found there. As part of a temple restoration a pottery jar was found containing 220 Islamic silver dirhem coins from the Ilkhanid period.

Excavations continued between 1977 and 1980, led by Suphi Anwar Rashid and Amire al-Khayyat, in the temple area. Paving and wall bricks dedicated to Enlil and Ninlil were found as well as a Kassite double jar burial, an inscribed eyestone for Enlil dedicated by Kurigalzu, and two female figurines in ivory.

Another area within Dur-Kurigalzu, Tell Abu Shijar, was excavated by Iraqi archaeologists in 1992, 1993, and 2001 finding mainly late Kassite and lesser Parthian/Sassanian remains. Painted plaster wall fragments, similar to those found at Tell al-Abyadh, were recovered as well as a worn cylinder seal and thirteen cuneiform clay tablets. The tablets were unread (and may be lost) but 3 were noted to have dates of the Kassite king Nazi-Maruttash (1307—1282 BC). The site lies 1 kilometer west of the ziggurat and 500 meters southwest of Tell al-Abyadh being about 6 meters in height with only the central 120-meter by 150-meter mound undisturbed by modern activity.

In the late-1960s an Italian team conducted a photogrammatic survey of the ziggurat.

== Wall paintings at Tell al-Abyadh ==
Some of the most significant finds of Kassite period artwork are found in the main palatial complex (P1) and its surrounding complexes (located at Tell al-Abyadh) of Dur-Kurigalzu about 1000 meters northwest of the main ziggurat. The recurring motifs of the artwork found on all four levels of the palatial complex are representational and contain human processional scenes and clusters of fruit; there are also geometric designs that contain parallel bands, chevrons, and rosettes. The processional scenes date to the time of the last Kassite king Marduk-apla-iddina I. The representational motif of human figures is also some of the only surviving instances of human representation in artwork from the Kassite period and gives an indication of the artistic technique utilized at the time. The majority of large, upright wall paintings can be found in the internal rooms of the palace that would have functioned as reception or public rooms. The highest concentration of this wall painting type can be found in Unit H sector on Level II named also 'PaintedPalace', dating to the reign of Kaštiliaš IV.

Another wall painting type is also found along recesses of the courtyards and between rooms and contains the same motifs of floral and geometric designs and processional scenes that Yoko Tomabechi states function to 'brighten the doorways and the inner rooms'. The colours utilised in these paintings are 'red, cobalt-blue, dark-blue, yellow, white and black'. Much of the palatial complex and its artwork inside remain unexcavated and need further exploration. In January 2025 the site of Aqar Quf has been included in the Tentative List of UNESCO World Heritage Convention.

== Temples ==
At the base of the ziggurat steps, is a pavement that leads to one of the four excavated temples, E-U-GAL. This would also continue to lead into a court and several smaller rooms adjoining it. The other three temples are E-GASAN-AN-TA-GAL, E-SAG-DINGIR-RI-E-NE, and E-SAG-DINGIR-E-NE. King Kurigalzu appears to have built all these temples under great patronage. The entire complex mostly has liben walls that are thickly covered with plaster and may bear traces of fire, which are thought to reflect attempts in destroying the site in the past.

=== E-U-GAL ===
E-U-GAL, which is likely to mean "The House of the Great Lord," is believed to be the most important temple of Dur Kurigalzu. This name could also refer to the entire temple complex or the entire site as the text was engraved into bricks in all three temples and in the ziggurat.

=== E-GASAN-AN-TA-GAL ===
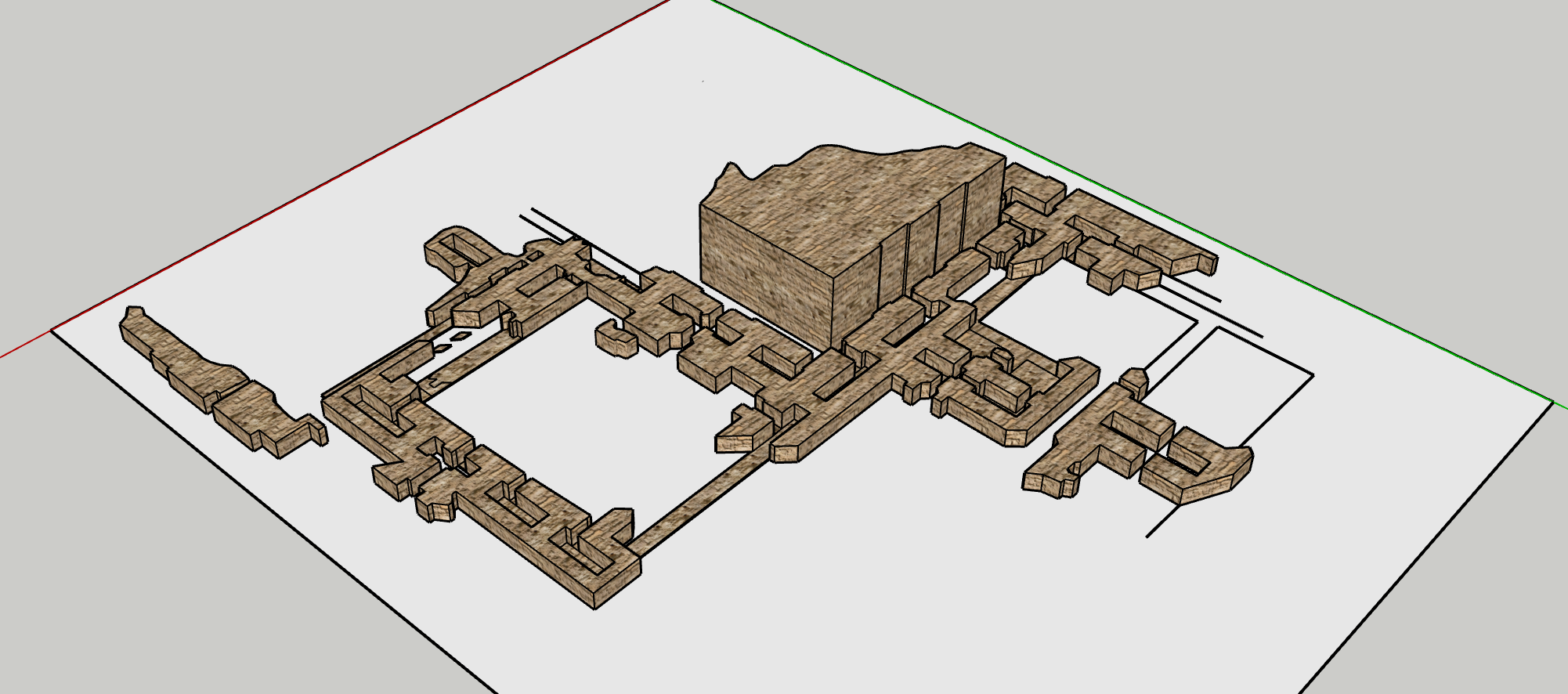
3-D reconstruction of the remains of the temple complex in Dur-Kurigalzu.

The name of the temple is a combination of "The House of the Lady" and words meaning "high", "firm", or "great". Inside this temple is a small staircase that leads up to an altar, subsidiary courts, and a room that appears to be the kitchen where a raised rectangular compartment was excavated and assumed to be an oven.

=== Tower ===
Between E-GASAN-AN-TA-GAL and E-U-GAL is a massive ruin, excavated to be 17 meters tall, that could be the foundation of a tower that was weathered away by floods. This structure was also made with liben and faced with baked bricks.

== Current status ==
For 16 seasons in the 1960s and 1970s the Iraqi government did conservation and restoration work at the site. Unfortunately the modern restoration work resulted in significant damage to the original construction it overlaid as it did at Babylon. Aqar Quf is currently suffering environmental damage and urban encroachment. Natural factors like rain and standing groundwater have contributed to the erosion of the ziggurat and damage to the ruins, especially along the southwest side. As a result of this damage, the ziggurat is in danger of further deterioration as well as collapse if preventive measures are not taken. The suburbs and industrial areas of Baghdad also continue developing near the site. Currently, there is an encroachment of modern construction along some stretches of the enclosure wall. There is also agricultural encroachment along the enclosure wall, especially on the southwest side. Iraqi Army maneuvers, involving trenches, did some damage to the site in the 1980s.

The ziggurat suffered damage as a result of the U.S. invasion of Iraq when the site was abandoned and looted during the security breakdown and chaos that followed the U.S. military's overthrow of Saddam Hussein. Little is left of the modern administration building, museum, event stage, and restaurant that once served the picnickers and students who visited the site before the war. Local government officials and the U.S. military charged with security in the area have been working to create a renovation plan. Since mid-2008, local officials have drafted plans to rebuild the historic site, yet to be implemented.

An Iraqi-Italian Archaeological Expedition by the University of Bologna and the SBAH, under the direction of prof. Nicolò Marchetti, has been working at the site of Aqar Quf since the Fall of 2022. The systematic survey of the site has been completed and, since the Fall of 2024, systematic excavations have also begun in the palace and temple areas. A new conservation project "ArTourBagh" funded by AICS and coordinated by Marchetti started in the Spring of 2025 with the aim of protecting and enhancing the mudbrick remains at the site, while promoting the touristic and social development in the area.

== Tell Basmaya ==
The site of Tell Basmaya lies about seven kilometers southeast of modern Baghdad at the Tigris-Diyala river junction and just to the northeast of ancient Dur-Kurigalzu. It covers an area of about 4 hectares and consists of eight mounds (ranging in height from 1 to 4.5 meters). All of the mounds have now been destroyed by modern development. It was first identified in a 1957-1958 regional survey by Robert Adams (site #562). It was worked for two seasons from 2013 to 2014 by the Iraqi State Board of Antiquities and Heritage, led by Taha K. Abod, in a program of rescue archaeology before the area was developed. Excavation occurred at four (5, 6, 7, 8) of the mounds only two of which (6 and 7) showed signs of occupation. On mound seven (0.96 hectares in area, 4 meters in height) eight sizable (five with 5 rooms, three with 13 rooms, one with 16 rooms) buildings were excavated. Ten fragmentary cuneiform tablets were found in those buildings with two tablets bearing year names (14th and 17th) of Kassite ruler Kadashman-Turgu (c. 1281–1264 BC) along with five cylinder seals and one sealing. One seal, of fossilized coral, contains the inscription "Marduk, have mercy on him". Small finds included metal daggers and chisels and a number of faience objects, including a face mask and three chariot fittings. Forty-four intramural and extramural graves were found including a brick tomb and a vaulted tomb. Some late Sassanian and early Arabic period remains were found including many Aramaic incantation bowls.

== Gallery ==
The following images represent the status of Aqar-Quf and its architectural remains as of December 29, 2021.

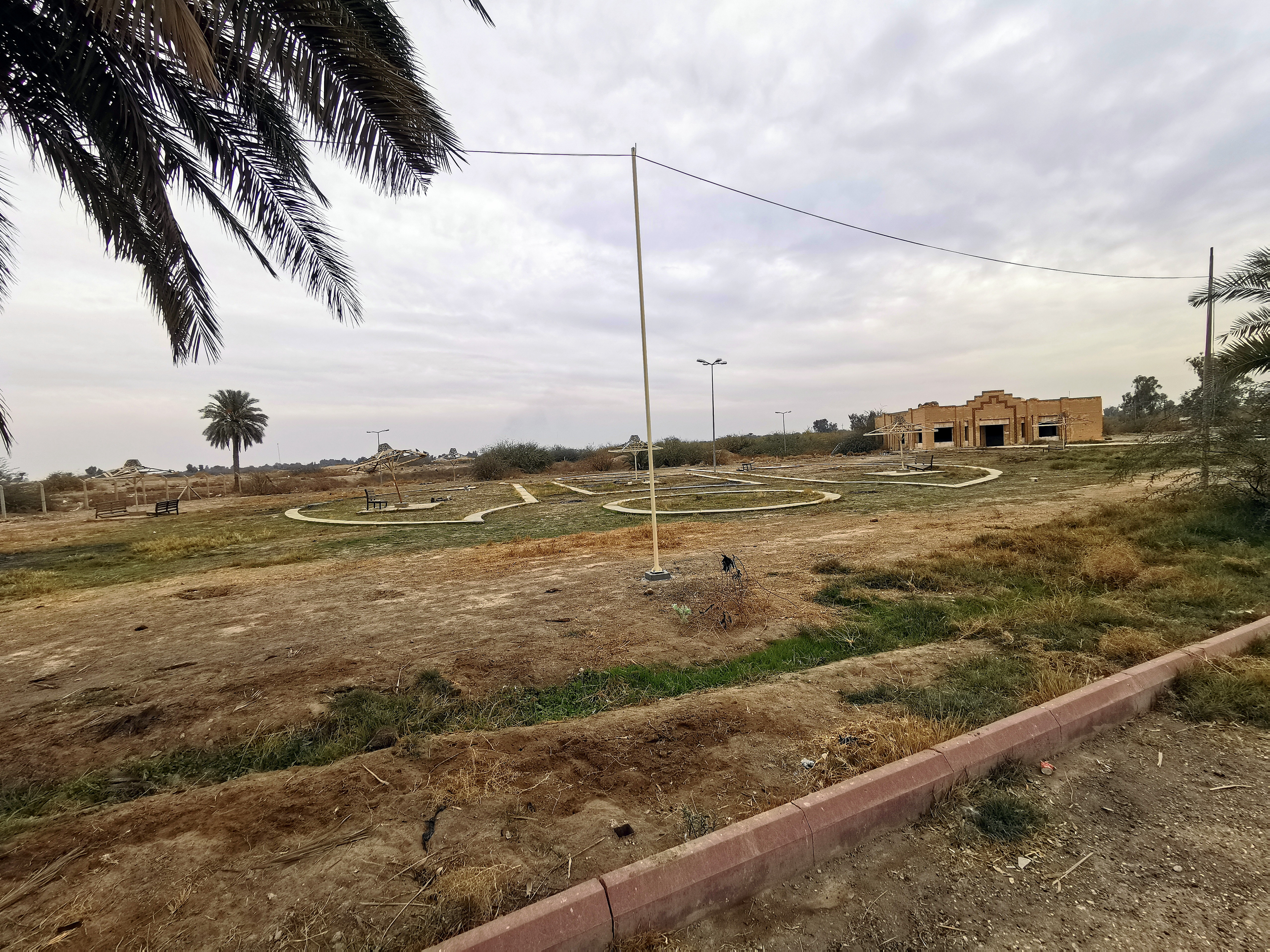
One of the modern buildings at Dur-Kurigalzu, plundered and not restored. Note the damaged outdoor park benches and umbrellas

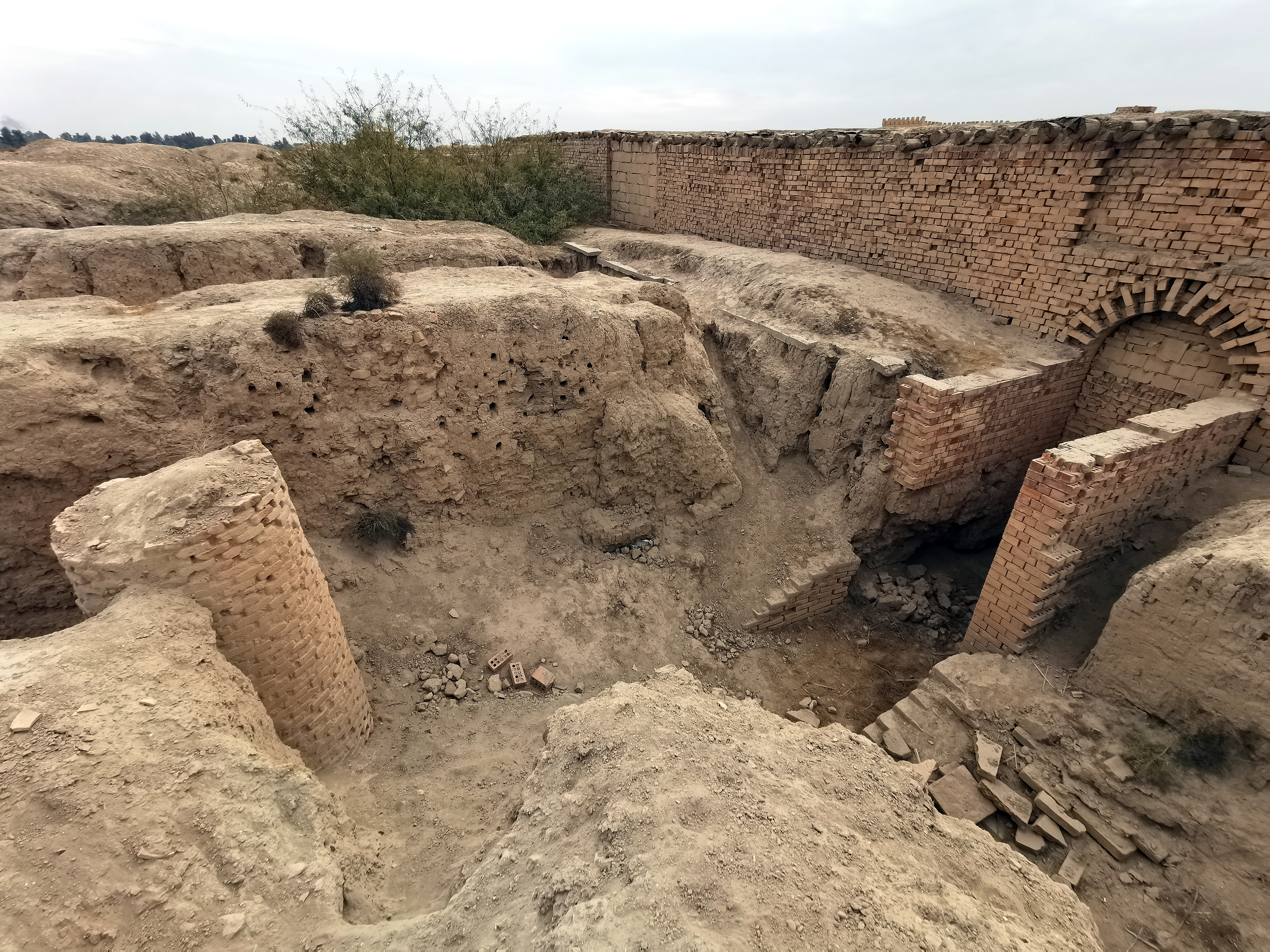
Ruins adjacent to the modernly reconstructed eastern part of the temple complex

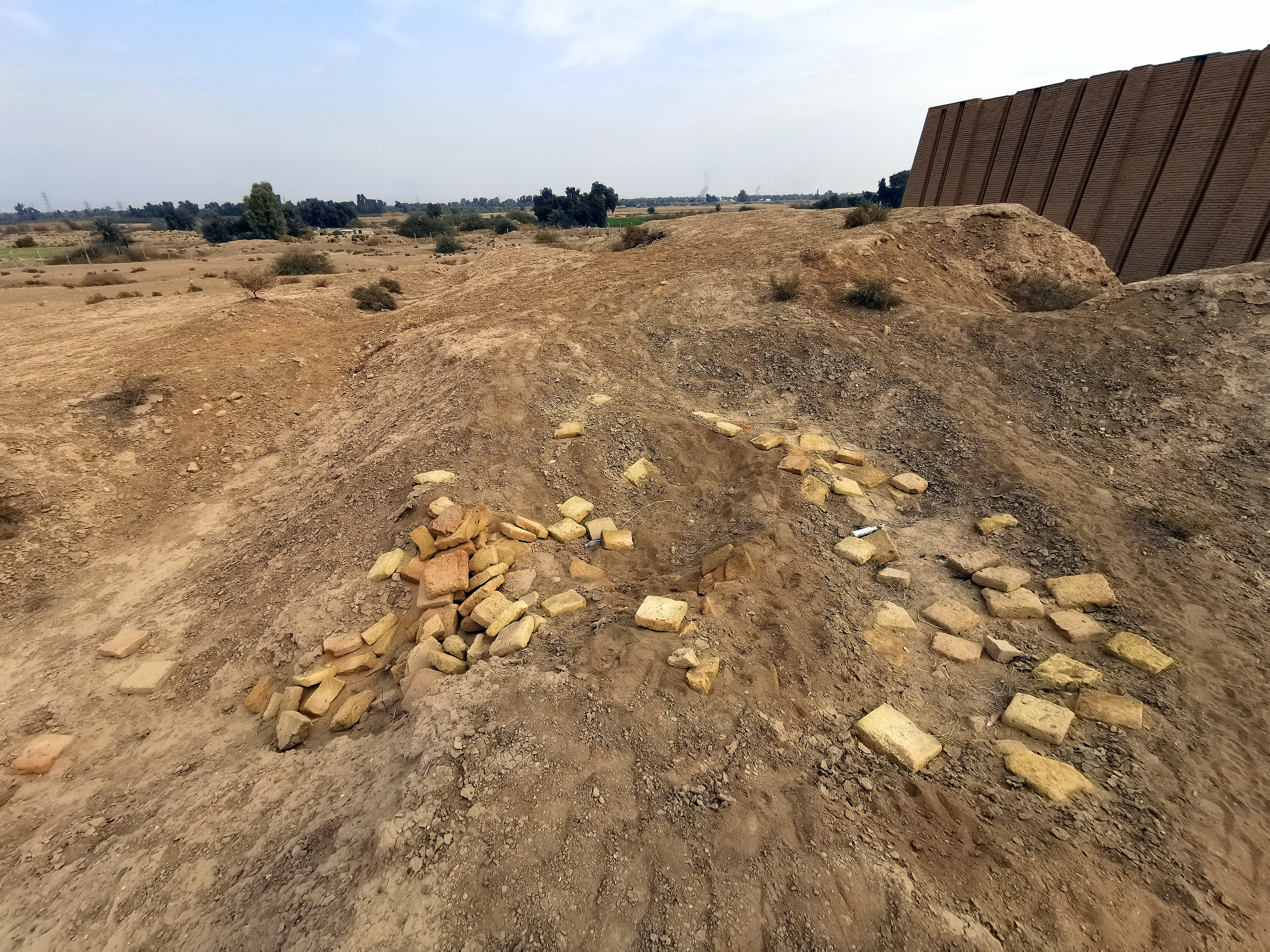
Scattered bricks near the north-east side of the ziggurat

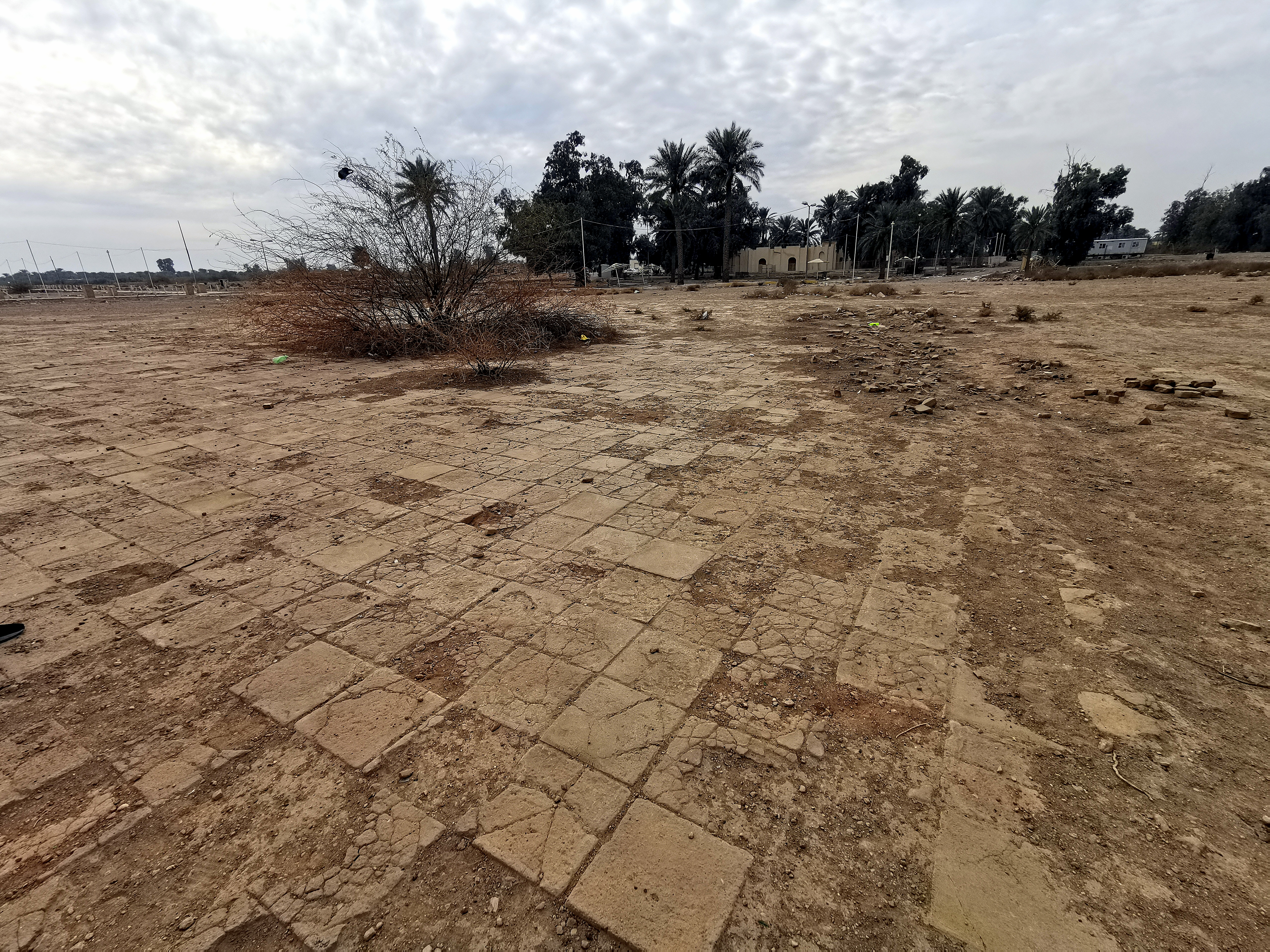
Tiles near the south-west side of the ziggurat

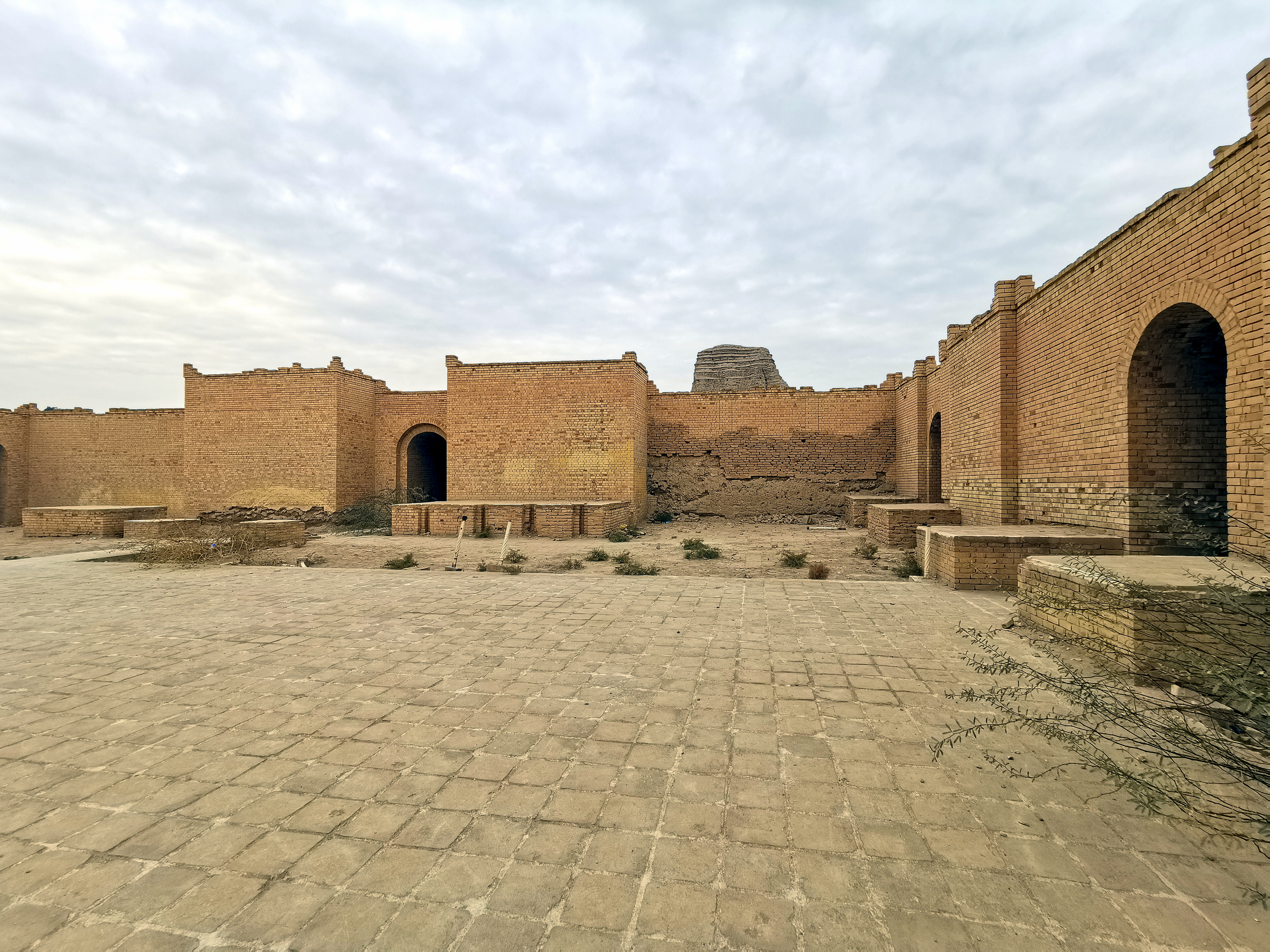
The courtyard of Enlil temple (E-U-GAL), the ziggurat is seen in the background

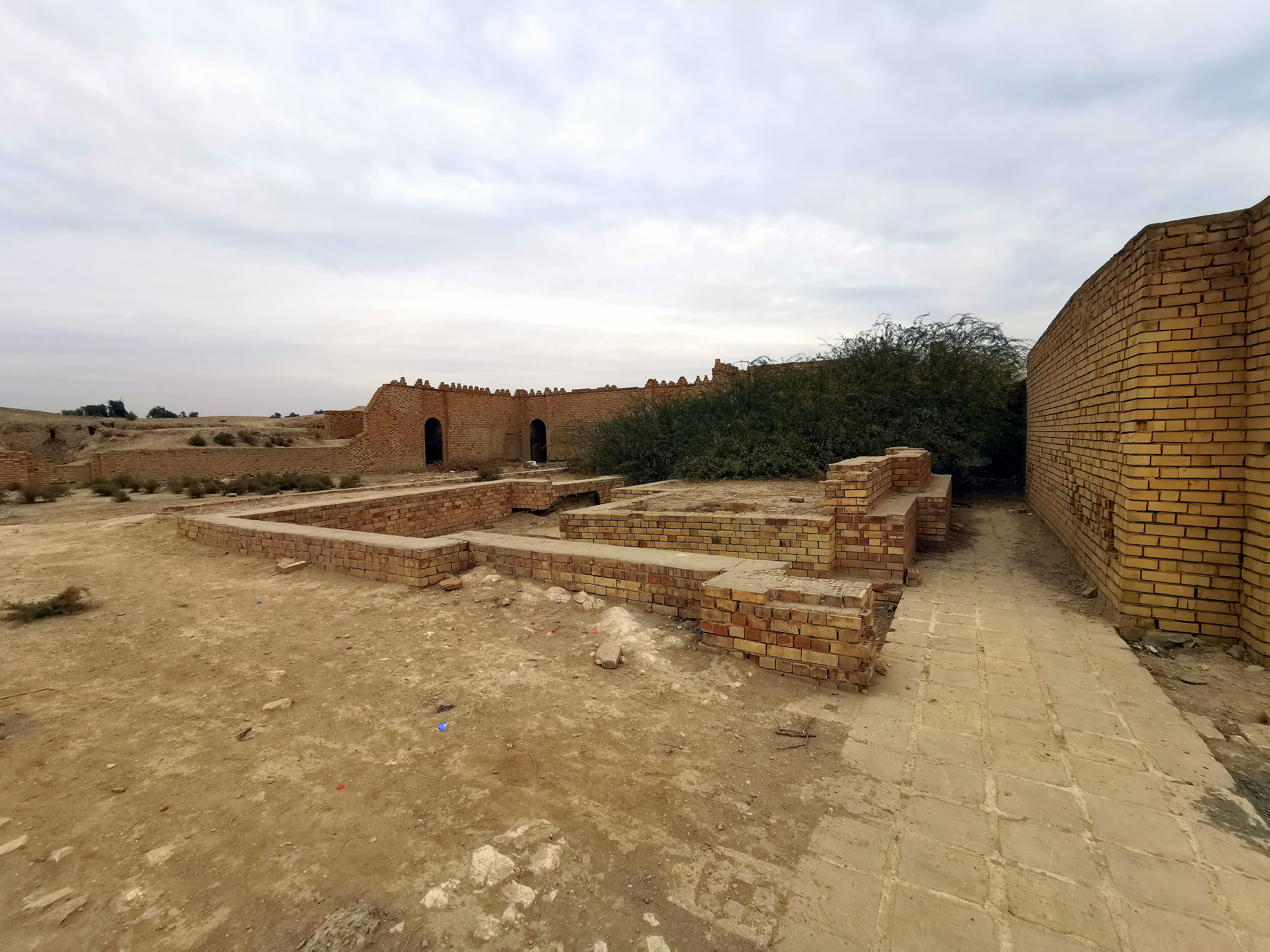
Ninlil temple (E-GASAN-AN-TA-GAL)

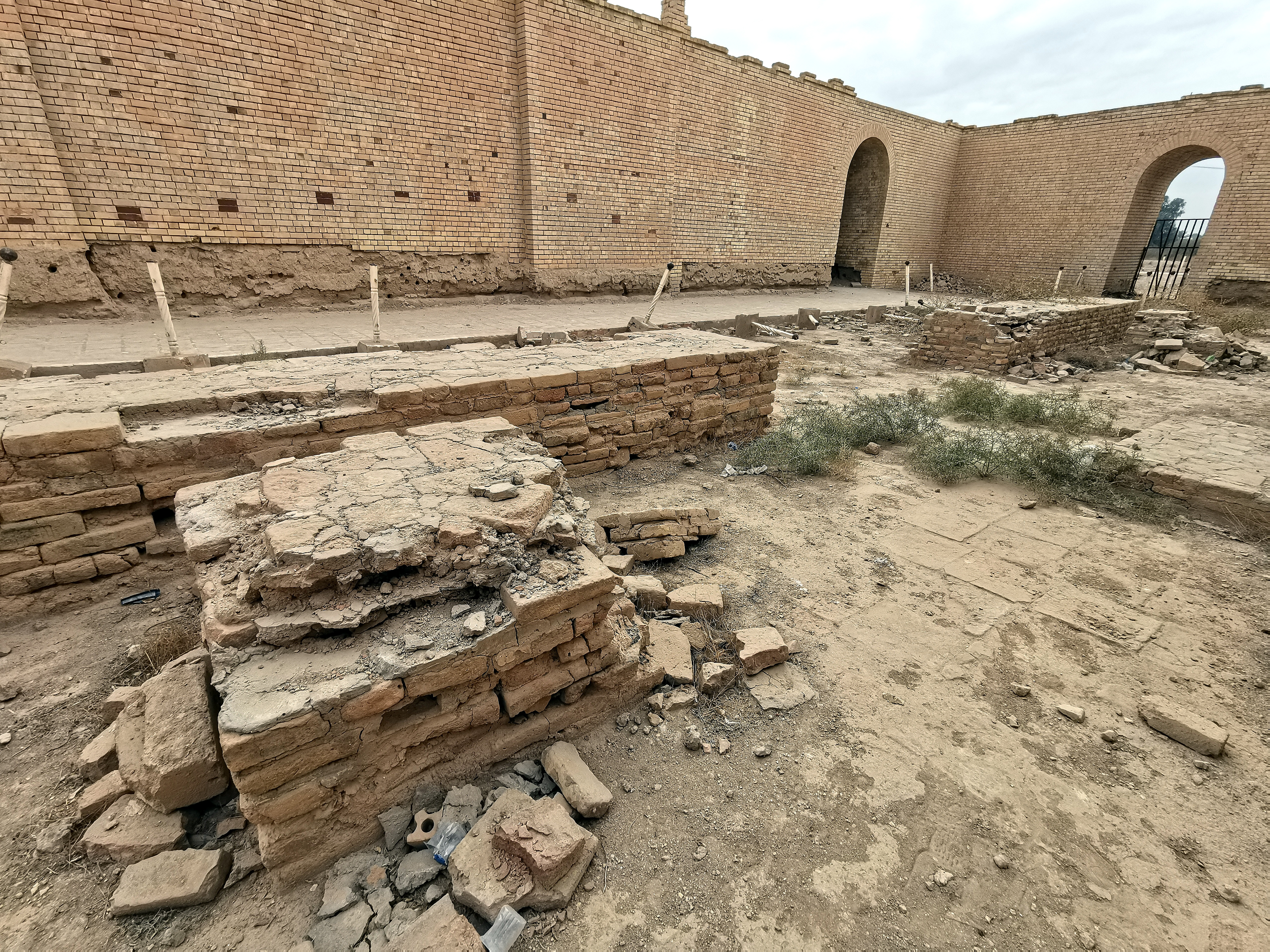
The courtyard of Ninurta temple (E-SAG-DINGIR-RI-E-NE)

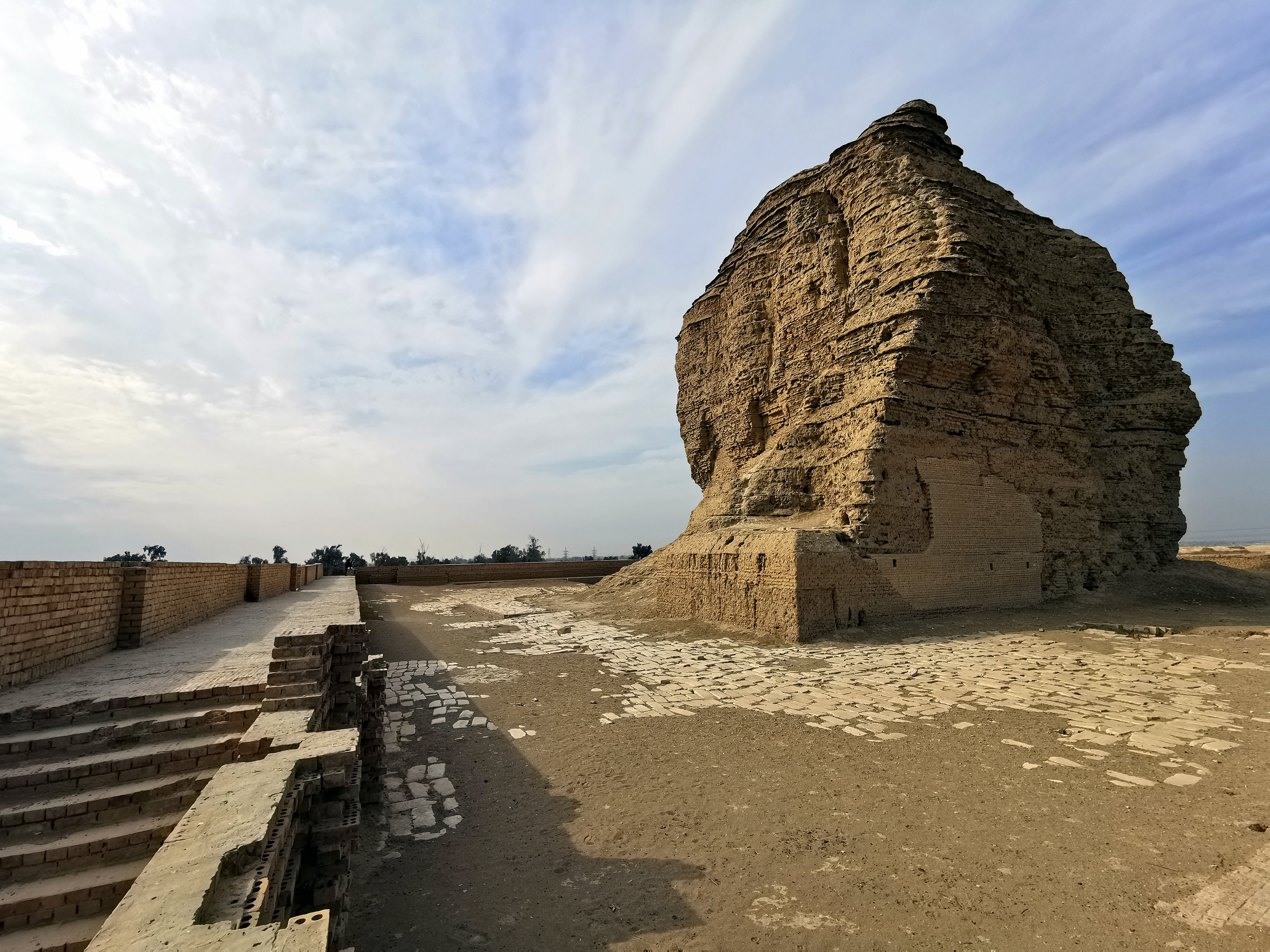
Level one of the ziggurat and its remaining core

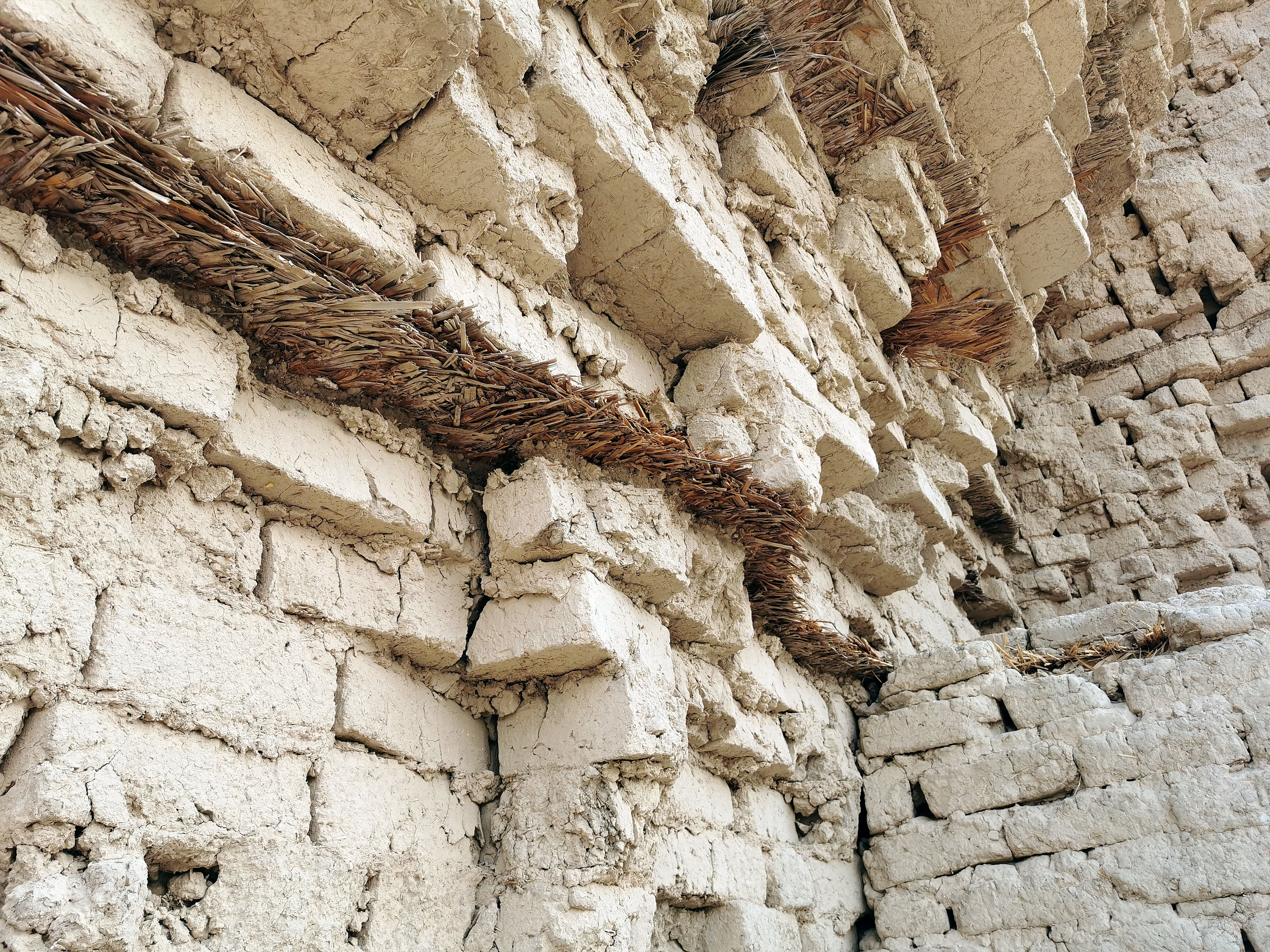
Layers of reed reinforcement, detail of the core of the ziggurat

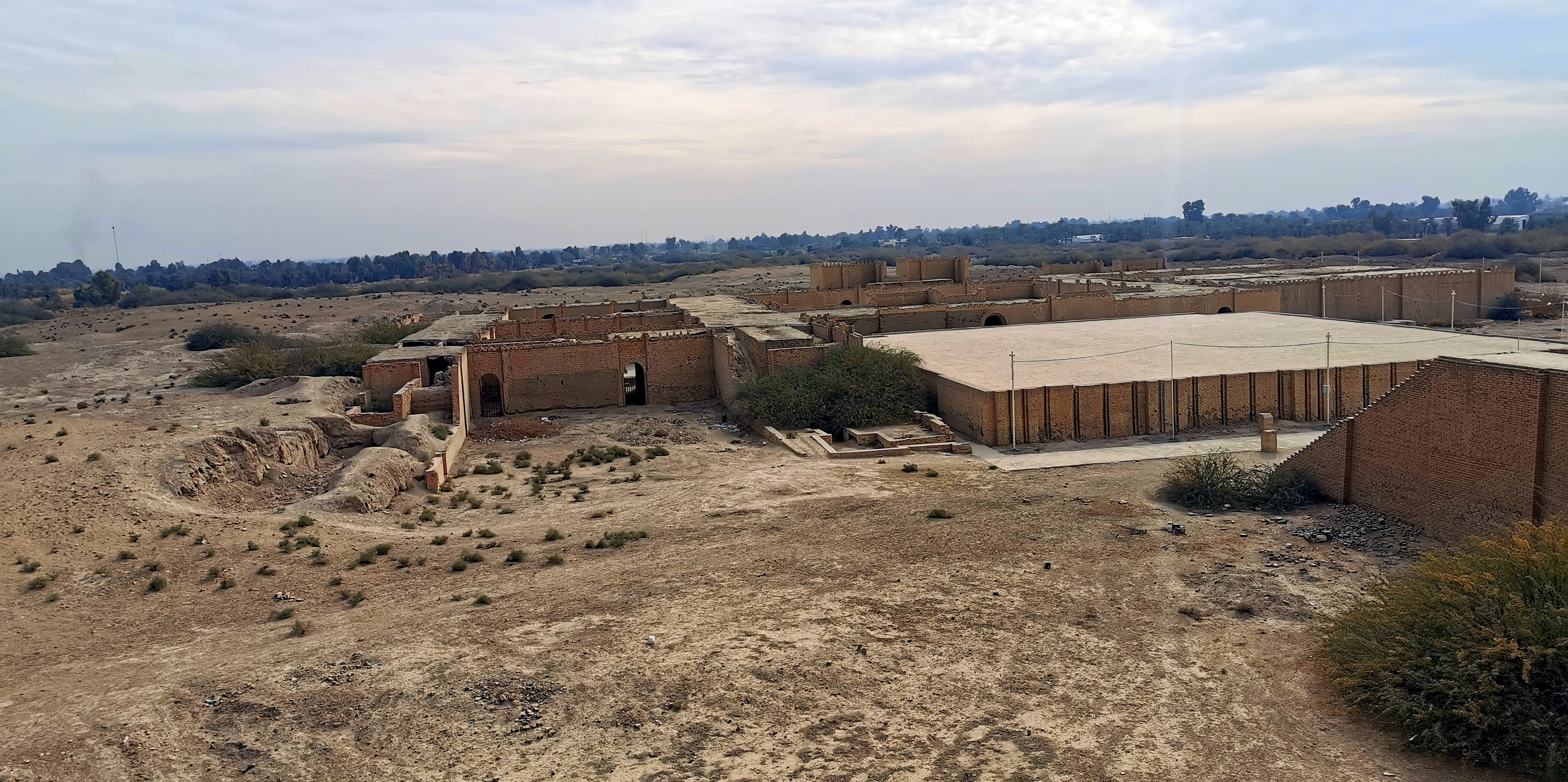
The reconstructed "platform" (right) before the axial stairway of the ziggurat. The temple complex appear

== See also ==
- Cities of the ancient Near East
- Chronology of the ancient Near East
- Kassite deities
- Kudurru
