= Nazi-Maruttash =

Nazi-Maruttaš
- King of Babylon
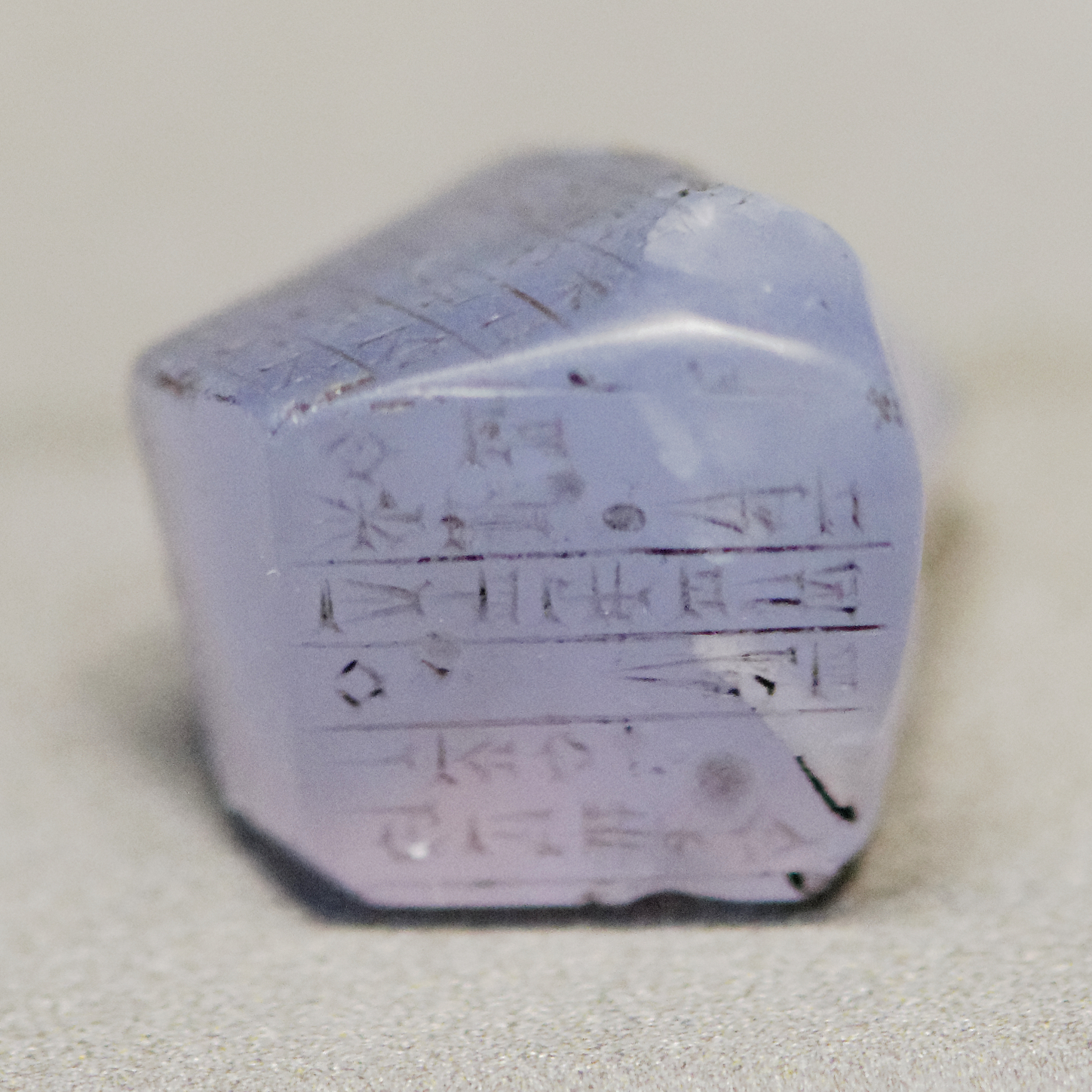
- Irregular block of chalcedony with votive inscription (Note: AO 7704, an irregular block of chalcedony with a nine-line Sumerian inscription, now held in the Louvre, transcribed: na-zi-ma-ru-ut-ta-aš, šàr kiššati (šár), mār ku-ri-gal-zu, šàr bābili (ká.dingir.ra)^{ki}, ša šumi, ša-aṭ-ra, ip-pa-aš-ši-ṭú, ^{d}Šamaš u ^{d}Adad, šum-šu lip-ši-ṭú.) of Nazi-Maruttaš in the Louvre
- Reign: 26 regnal yrs c. 1307–1282 BC
- Predecessor: Kurigalzu II
- Successor: Kadašman-Turgu
- House: Kassite

Nazi-Maruttaš, typically inscribed Na-zi-Ma-ru-ut-ta-aš or ^{m}Na-zi-Múru-taš, Maruttaš (a Kassite god synonymous with Ninurta) protects him, was a Kassite king of Babylon c. 1307–1282 BC and self-proclaimed šar kiššati, or "King of the World", according to the votive inscription pictured. He was the 23rd of the dynasty, the son and successor of Kurigalzu II, and reigned for twenty-six years. (Note: According to the Kinglist A tablet, BM 33332, column 2, line 2, in the British Museum.)

== Reign ==
His reign can be seen as the peak of the Kassite Dynasty, exemplified by his successful military campaigns against Assyria and Elam, the glyptic style of cylinder seals, the literature inspired by him (Hemerology for Nazi-Maruttaš), and his appearance in the period piece Ludlul bēl nēmeqi, which was set during his reign.

=== Military campaigns ===
==== Conflict with Assyria ====
Nazi-Maruttaš faced a growing threat from the ascendancy of Assyria under Arik-den-ili and his successor Adad-Nīrāri I. The containment of Assyria was conducted through a strategy of flank attacks supported by his agents, eastern hillmen such as the Gutians, in a protracted war, avoiding a full frontal assault. Under Arik-den-ili, he seems to have had the upper hand, because Adad-Nīrāri, who styles himself "King of the Universe", later recounts (Note: In the Epic of Adad-Nārāri, tablet VAT 9820 line 12: hi-ib-lat um-ma-ni MAN KUR ka.-.i-i a-bi ul ul-te-.èr.) that "my father could not rectify the calamities inflicted by the army of the king of the Kassite land" in a contemporary Assyrian epic.

He is mentioned in the Synchronistic Chronicle (Note: Synchronistic Chronicle (ABC 21) tablet C, column 1, lines 24 to 31.) as having fought a battle with Adad-Nīrāri's forces at "Kār-Ištar of Ugarsallu". The Assyrians claimed a complete victory over the Babylonians in this battle, plundering their camp and seizing the royal standards, thereby acquiring territory from them and causing the Assyro-Babylonian boundary to be adjusted southward. The conflict is fondly remembered in the Tukulti-Ninurta Epic, (Note: Tukulti-Ninurta Epic, extant in fragments BM 98496, BM 98730, BM 98731, BM 121033.) in its recounting of past Assyro-Babylonian conflicts, where he says, "And like Adad – I will send a devastating flood upon your camp!"

==== Other conflicts ====
There is evidence of a successful attack on Elam, because texts (Note: Ration lists Ni 6932 Šagarakti-Šuriaš year 9 and Ni 7050 Kaštiliašu IV accession year.) of this period concerning ration lists and foreign prisoners of war mention Nazi-Maruttaš in sections concerning the Elamites. A historical letter (Note: Tablet CBS 11014.) details his campaign in Mat Namri, a Hurrian region, and possibly his conquest of its twelve cities.

A fragment of a tablet (Note: K 11536 published in MSKH I as U.2.26, p. 282.) relates that "Marduk ca[used] all the lands [to bow down] at his feet". A treasury list (Note: CBS 14180.) catalogues more than 125 precious artifacts and their move from Dūr-Kurigalzu and Nippur to Ardi-Bêlit during his 5th year, possibly for safe keeping.

=== Building works ===
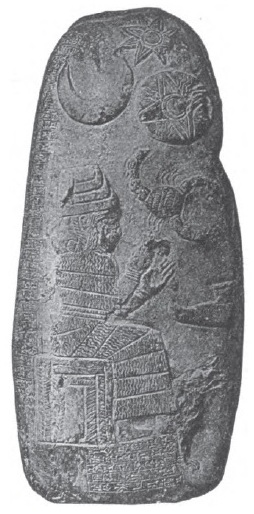
Kudurru of Nazi-Maruttaš (Note: Kudurru Sb. 21, a later stone copy of clay original.)

He is known to have made at least three Kudurru boundary stones, although the one pictured is a later stone copy made during the reign of Marduk-apla-iddina I to replace the clay original (narū ša haṣbi) which was crushed by a falling temple wall.

A shrine to Gula was uncovered in 1946 in an eroded building with a pavement of much damaged kiln-baked bricks, some inscribed for Nazi-Maruttaš. This was located in the palace area at the Kassite capital, Dūr-Kurigalzu. Work was also undertaken at Nippur, and excavations have yielded various tablets. He was also active in building as far south as Uruk, the cella of the Eḫiliana of Nanâ, as attested to by a later inscription by Esarhaddon. (Note: Esarhaddon inscription YBC 2146.) Other cities formerly abandoned such as Larsa, Ur, Adab, and Isin show evidence of revival in his reign.

There are nearly 400 economic texts dated to years up to the twenty fourth of his reign, detailing things as mundane as the receipt of barley and malt, the issuing of grain, goats, hides, sheep and oil. A tablet found in Tell Kirbasi, on the south side of the central Hor al-Hammar 30 km west of Basra, lists 47 head of cattle in the sixteenth year of Nazi-Maruttaš, showing the extent of trade.

=== The Hemerology for Nazi-Maruttaš ===
A single standard hemerology, or uttuku, was collated during his time. A 'hemerology' was a sort of almanac stating which days of each month were favorable, unfavorable, or dangerous for activities of interest to the king, such as those propitious for begetting children, or setting taxes. It was typically used by scribes, temple administrators, priests, cultic singers and exorcists and provided detailed instructions for "auspicious days".

The colophon of the work reads, "Auspicious days according to the seven a[pkallī?] originals from Sippar, Nippur, Babylon, Ur, Larsa, Uruk and Eridu. The scholars excerpted, selected, and gave to Nazi-Maruttaš, king of the world." Five extant examples (Note: KAR 147, KAR 177 (=VAT 9663), etc.) have been found, including a bilingual copy in Dur-Kurigalzu, another found in the house of LÚ.NAR.GAL "cultic singers" in Aššur and a third in the house of Kiṣir-Aššur, exorcist of the temple of Aššur during the reign of Aššurbanipal.

Lambert has argued that Ludlul bēl nēmeqi was composed during his reign based upon the identification of the protagonist Šubši-mašrâ-Šakkan with that of a character in a fragment of an epic of the Kassite times, (Note: K 9952 W G Lambert BWL pl. 12 pp 296f., BM 35322, Sp. II,893.) and to the governor, or ^{lú}gar kur, of Ur during his 16th regnal year. Nazi-Maruttaš’ name appears on the reverse of a literary text fragment known as KAR 116 (Note: KAR 116, tablet VAT 11245 r. 10.) which Lambert identified as belonging to this work.

The prominent physician, or asû, from Nippur, Rabâ-ša-Marduk, began his lengthy, well-attested career during Nazi-Maruttaš’ reign.

== See also ==
- Nazimaruttaš kudurru stone
- Maruts
