= Adad-nirari I =

- King of Assyria

King of the Middle Assyrian Empire
- Reign: 31 regnal years 1305–1274 BC (MC); 1295–1263 BC (SC)
- Predecessor: Arik-den-ili
- Successor: Shalmaneser I
- Issue: Shalmaneser I, Ibashi-ili
- Father: Arik-den-ili

Adad-nārārī I (1305–1274 BC or 1295–1263 BC short chronology) was a king of Assyria during the Middle Assyrian Empire. His annals survived in more detail than most of his predecessors, and he achieved numerous major military victories that further strengthened the position of Assyria as the most powerful state in the world at the time.

== Early life ==
His name is rendered in all but two inscriptions ideographically as ^{md}adad-ZAB+DAḪ, meaning "Adad (is) my helper,"

In his inscriptions from Assur he calls himself son of Arik-den-ili, the same filiations being recorded in the Nassouhi kinglist. (Note: Nassouhi kinglist, iii 23.) He is recorded as a son of Enlil-nirari in the Khorsabad kinglist (Note: Khorsabad kinglist iii 17.) and the SDAS kinglist, (Note: SDAS kinglist, iii 8.) probably in error.

== Reign ==
=== Early rule ===
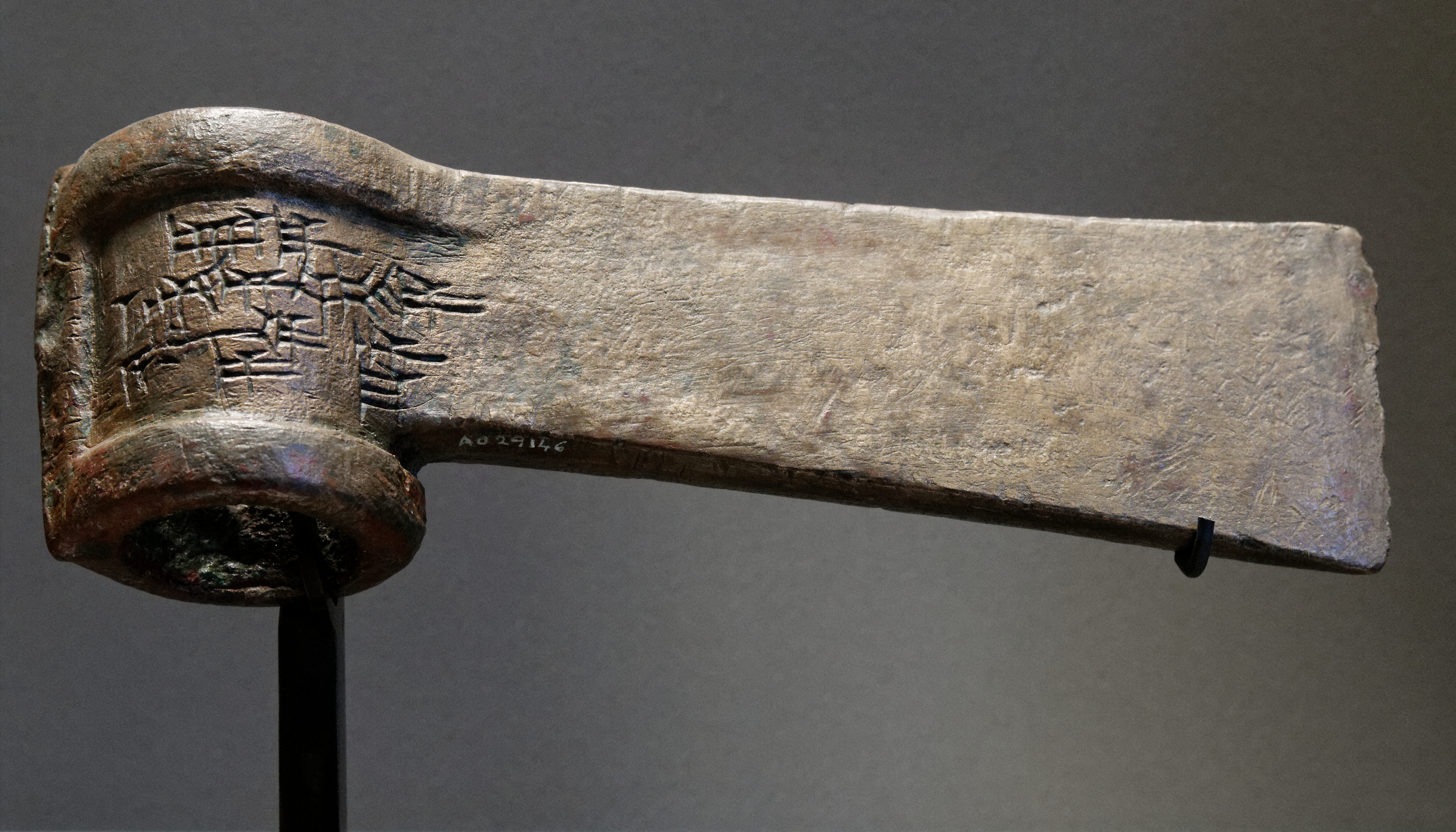
Axe blade with the name Adad-nārārī I: Kassite period. (Note: Axe blade, AO 29146.) in the Louvre.

He boasted that he was the "defeater of the heroic armies of the Kassites (the ruling dynasty of their Babylonian neighbours to the south), Qutu (their eastern Gutean neighbours in northwestern Iran), Lullumu (the pre Indo-European Lullubi tribesmen of Ancient Iran immediately east of Assyria) and Shubaru (" Hurrian and Hittite northerners in Asia Minor"). Pacifier of all enemies above and below." The defeat of Nazi-Maruttaš's Kassite forces must have been particularly sweet as his father "could not rectify the calamities inflicted by the king of the Kassite lands," during his reign. It took place at the town of Kar Ishtar in the province of Ugarsulu and victory was assured when Adad Nirari's army fell on the Kassite camp "like a devastating flood," as described gloatingly by Tukulti-Ninurta I in his eponymous epic, (Note: Tukulti-Ninurta Epic, extant in several fragments, for example BM 98496, BM 98730, BM 98731 and BM 121033 in the British Museum.) plundering and carrying off his royal standard. (Note: Synchronistic Chronicle (ABC 21) tablet C, column 1, lines 24 to 31.) This triumph resulted in a border realignment with Assyria extending its territory into southern Mesopotamia, into Pilasqu, the city of Arman in Ugarsallu and Lullumu.

Nazi-Maruttaš' successor, Kadašman-Turgu was sufficiently motivated to secure peace that he seems to have agreed to a humiliating treaty with Adad Nirari where "he pardoned his (Nazi-Maruttaš') son of the crime," twice. (Note: Tablet VAT 15420.)

=== Relations with Mitanni and Hittites ===
With peace and territorial gains in Assyria's favour towards Babylon in the south, the Assyrians could turn their attention north and westwards, taking lands from the former Mitanni Empire. Under Shattiwaza, Hanigalbat (the southern remnant of the Mitanni Empire) had become a vassal state of the Hittite empire, celebrated with a treaty, as a buffer to the ascendant Assyrians. But treaties were between individual kings during the late bronze age as nation states had yet to emerge and with the accession of Shattuara I in Hanigalbat and Urhi Teššup as Mursili III of the Hittites and a waning of Hittite engagement in international affairs, the former may have sought to adopt a more independent position.

According to Adad-nārārī, conflict was triggered by Shattuara's preemptive attack which resulted in the defeat and capture of the Mitanni king Shattuara, who was taken to Aššur and forced to swear fealty as a vassal of the Assyrians, (Note: BM 115687 dark grey stone in the British Museum, inscribed on all six sides.) apparently without any attempted intervention by the Hittites, providing regular tribute for the remainder of his reign.

Bolstered by his military victories, Adad-nārārī pronounced himself šar kiššati, "king of the universe," in imitation of his ancient predecessor Shamshi-Adad I, and greeted his Hittite counterpart on equal terms as a fellow "great king." He invited himself to visit Amman Mountain (Amanus, a cult center perhaps?) in his "brother's" territory, drawing a scathing put down from Hittite king Mursili III (Urhi Teššup),

So you've become a "Great King," have you? But why do you still continue to speak about "brotherhood" and about coming to Mt. Ammana?... For what reason should I call you "brother"?…Do those who are not on familiar terms with each other call each other "brother"? Why then should I call you "brother"? Were you and I born of the same mother? As my grandfather and my father did not call the King of Assyria "brother," you should not keep writing to me (about) "coming" and "Great King-ship." It displeases me. (Note: Tablet 7499, text KUB 23:102, Urhi Teššup letter to Adad-nārārī, see Bryce (2003), p. 87 note 21 for summary of provenance.)

By the time Hittite king Hattusili III (c. 1267–1237 BC) overthrew Urhi Teššup, the conquest was a fait accompli and a sheepish Hattušili was to request that Adad-nārārī intervene to curb the incursions of the people of Turira, a Hanigalbat frontier town, against those of Carchemish, still a loyal Hittite vassal but a future Assyrian city,

"If Turira is yours, smash it!... If Turira is not yours, write to me so that I may smash it. The possessions of your troops who are dwelling in the city shall not be claimed."

Hattušili's main complaint, however, was the breach in protocol caused when Adad-nārārī snubbed his inauguration:

"It is the custom that when kings assume kingship, the kings, his equals in rank, send him appropriate [gifts of greeting]. Clothing befitting kingship, and fine [oil] for his anointing. But you did not do this today."

Hattušili was at great pains to placate his Assyrian counterpart following the "sad experiences" encountered by his envoys in their dealings with his predecessor and call on Adad-nārārī to confirm with his own envoy, Bel-qarrad, that he had been treated well by Hattušili. Although still in the Bronze Age, iron was not unknown, and Hattušili goes on to discuss Adad-nārārī's request for the metal:

In regard to the good iron about which you wrote to me – good iron is not available in my armory in the city of Kizzuwatna. I have written that it is a bad time for making iron. They will make good iron, but they have not yet finished it. When they finish it, I will send it to you. For the moment, I have sent you a dagger blade of iron. (Note: Tablet KBo I:14 Hattušili letter to Adad-Nirari.)

Conflict with Hanigalbat resumed when Shattuara's son, Wasashatta, rebelled and engaged with the Hittites for support. Adad-nārārī was later to gloat that the Hittites took his gifts but gave nothing in return when he (Adad-nārārī) counterattacked, sacking and plundering the cities of Amasaku, Kahat, Shuru, Nabula, Hurra, Irridu, Shuduhu and Washshukanu, places largely as yet unidentified, destroying the city of Taite (Taida) and sowing kudimmus over it. (Note: The kudimmu plant, which exuded a kind of salt or lye, was planted on ruins to symbolically pronounce them barren and uninhabitable.(See Salting the earth.))

The denouement took place at Irridu (Ordi?) where Wasashatta was captured and, along with his extended family and court, deported in fetters to Aššur where he vanished from history. Adad-nārārī annexed the kingdom of Hanigalbat, enslaved its people, (Note: Imposing the "hoe, spade and basket.") and appointed a governor drawn from the Assyrian aristocracy. While the name of this individual is unknown, one of his successors, during the later reign of Šulmanu-ašaredu, was Qibi Assur who founded a short dynasty of Assyrian viceroys ruling over this region.

=== Governance ===
The seat of Assyrian governance was possibly Wasashatta's former capital, Taida, because his monumental steles recounted that it "had become dilapidated and (he) removed its debris. (He) restored it," (Note: Assur 5764 and 9309.) rebuilding the palace replete with a suitably boastful commemorative inscription prepared but never installed as it was found in the ruins of Assur. His building restorations in the city of Assur were celebrated in monumental inscriptions and include the Step Gate of the temple of the god Ashur, various of the city's walls, its quay along the river Tigris, the temple of Ishtar and the storehouses of the gate of An and Adad.

His reign lasted for 31 years, but only around 12 Limmu officials, from the Assyrian Eponym dating system have yet been identified, primarily from monumental inscriptions, and these include Shulmanu-qarradu, Andarasina, Ashur-eresh, variant Ashur-erish (son of Abattu), Ana-Ashur-qalla (officer of the palace), Iti-ili-ashamshu, Sha-Adad-ninu, Qarrad-Ashur, Assur-dammiq, (Note: Tablet KAJ 262, Urad-serua #23 corn loan.) Sin-n[a....], (Note: Tablet KAJ 77, Urad-serua #53 corn loan.) Ninurta-emuqaya, (Note: Tablet KAJ 76, Urad-serua #11 corn loan.) Bābu-aḫa-iddina and Adad-šumu-lesir, the eponym in whose year he died. Bābu-aḫa-iddina was a high-ranking official, some sources say "chancellor," son of Ibassi-ili, who served under Adad-nārārī and his two successors. He celebrated his eponym year towards the end of Adad-nārārī's reign as attested in texts relating the activities of Assur-kasid son of Sin-apla-eris at Billa. His archive, called "archive 14410," consisting of 60 tablets was found in a tomb under a house in Assur.

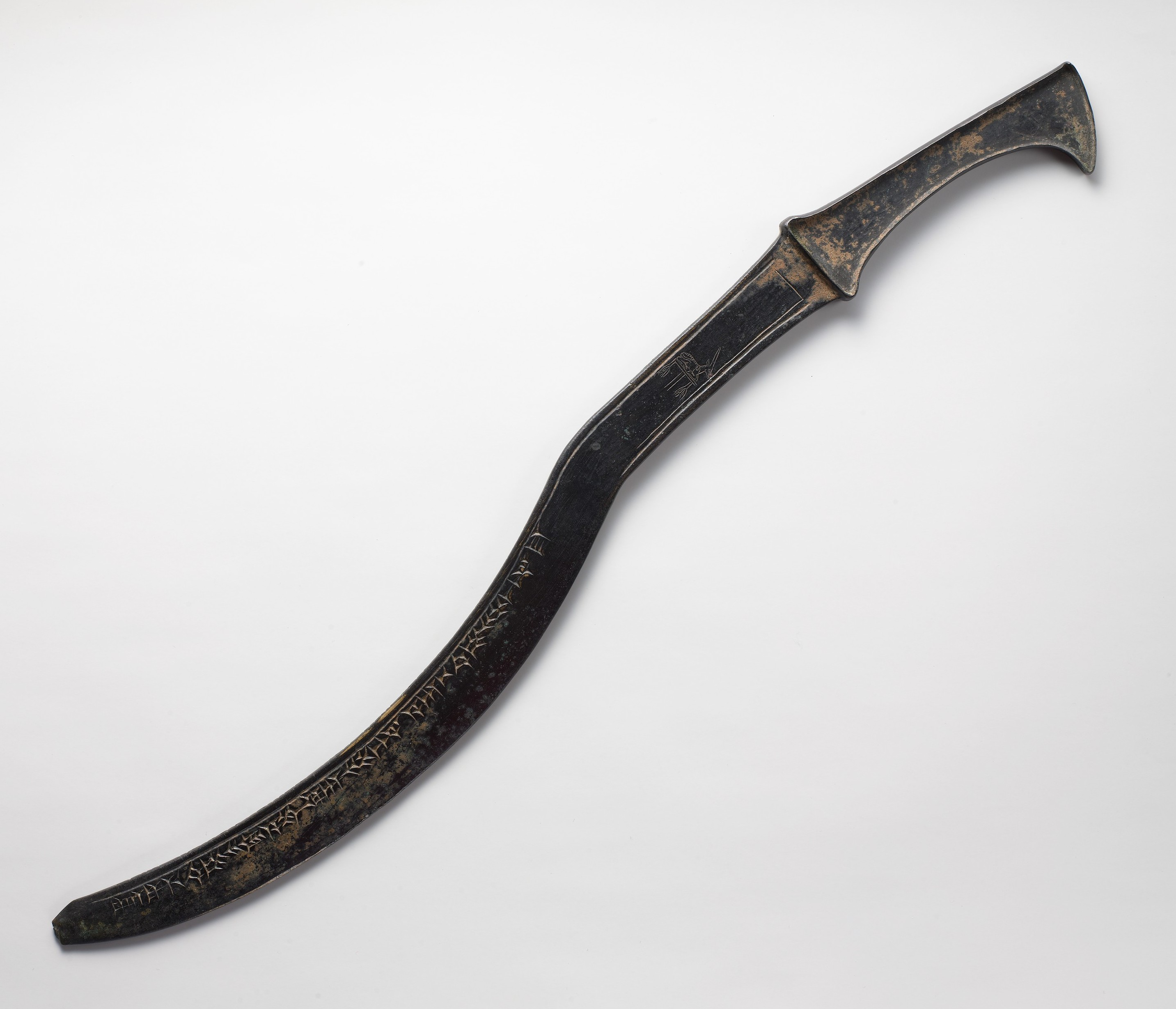
Sword of Adad-Nirari I. Public Domain

A bronze sword of Adad-nārārī I can be seen in the Metropolitan Museum of Art.

=== The Adad-nārārī epic ===
This historical epic is extant in four fragments (Note: Tablets Rm 293, in the Rassum siglum in the British Museum and VAT 10084, VAT 9820 and VAT 10889 in the Vorderasiatisches Museum Berlin.) and concerns the conflict between Adad-nārārī and his Babylonian contemporary Nazi-Maruttash, with whom he clashes and ultimately vanquishes in battle. The surviving pieces do not allow for a detailed narrative to be reconstructed. They do, however, suggest a sequence of events, where Adad-nārārī harks back to the setbacks faced by his father, "the seed of the men has disappeared forever," his petitioning of the god Šamaš, "O Šamaš you are the true judge," in preparation for his denouement with "the unjust Kassite king," and so on.

== Archaeological discoveries ==
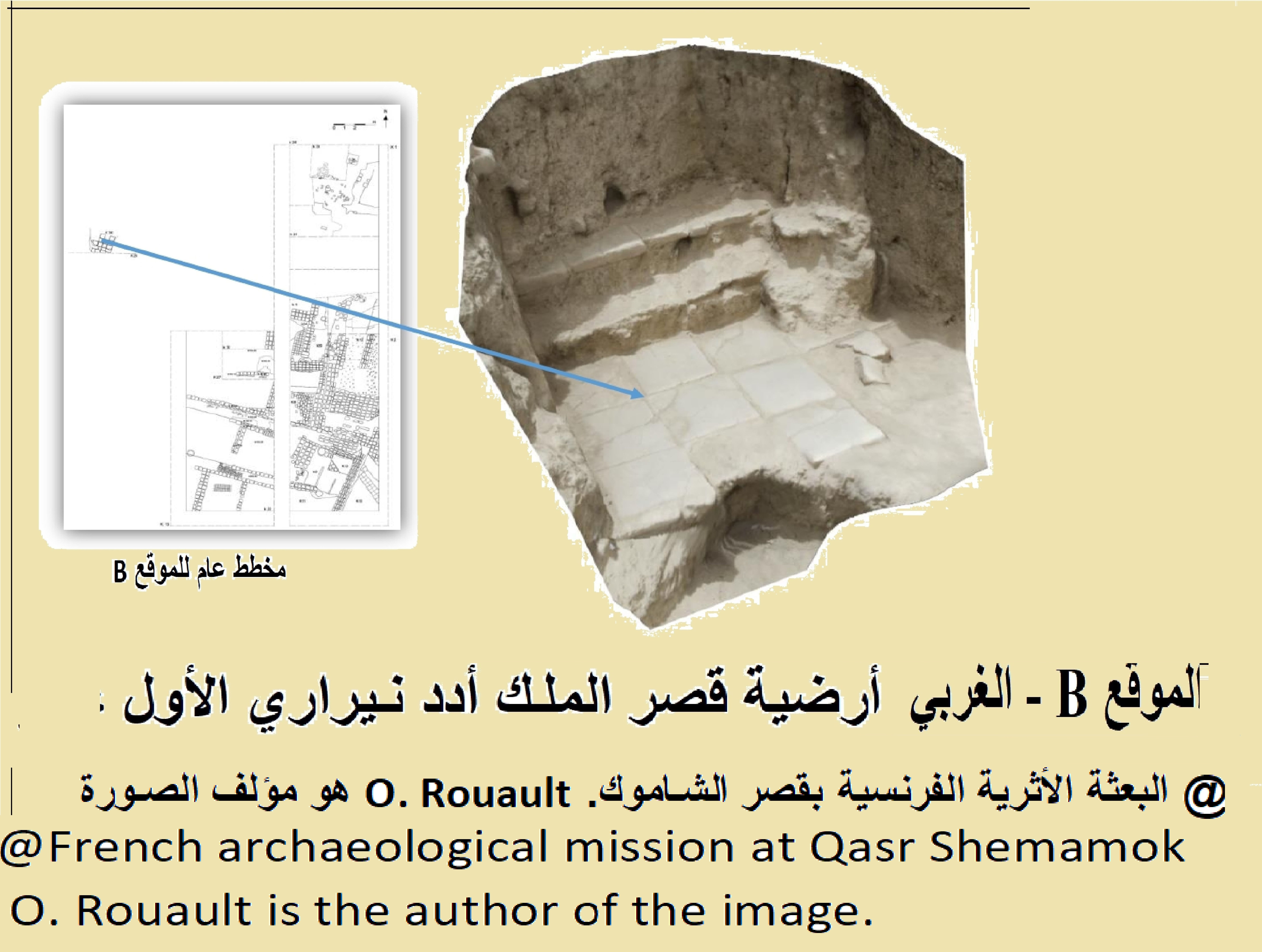
remains of a palace built by Adad-nirari I. in Qasr Shemamok hill in Erbil

In 2018, inscriptions were discovered at Qasr Shemamok on four brick molds referring to the celebration of building a palace by the Assyrian king Adad-nirari I (1308-1275 BC) in Kilizu.

== Notes ==
| Preceded by Arik-den-ili | King of Assyria; 1305 – 1274 BC | Succeeded by Shalmaneser I |
