= Arik-den-ili =

- King of Assyria

King of the Middle Assyrian Empire
- Reign: 12 regnal years 1317–1306 BC
- Predecessor: Enlil-nirari
- Successor: Adad-nirari I
- Issue: Adad-nirari I
- Father: Enlil-nirari

Arik-den-ili, inscribed ^{m}GÍD-DI-DINGIR, “long-lasting is the judgment of god,” was King of Assyria c. 1317–1306 BC, ruling the Middle Assyrian Empire. He succeeded Enlil-nirari, his father, and was to rule for twelve years and inaugurate the tradition of annual military campaigns against Assyria's neighbors.

== Biography ==
The sources are slim for his reign, less than ten inscriptions, a fragmentary chronicle and references to his affairs in those of his son Adad-nirari I’s accounts. He seems to have been the first of the Assyrian kings to have institutionalized the conduct of annual military campaigns, some of which appear to be little more than livestock-rustling expeditions, as the chronicle mentions “a hundred head of sheep and goats and a hundred head of their cattle [...] he brought to Aššur.”

Arik-den-ili's first victories were against his eastern neighbours (the Pre-Iranic inhabitants of what was to become Persia), Turukku and Nigimhi, and all the chiefs of the (Zagros) mountains and highlands in the broad tracts of the Gutians to subdue the nomadic tribes on Assyria's northern and eastern frontiers. The Gutians had been vassals of the Kassites who ruled in Babylon and may have acted as their agents. Nigimhi's ruler was Esini. The Assyrians had invaded and carried off their harvest and in retaliation Esini led a force into Assyria which resulted in a massacre of his forces. Arik-den-ili besieged the town of Arnuna, in which Esini was holed up. Destruction of the gate and walls forced Esini's capitulation and so he swore allegiance to his Assyrian overlord.

The chronicle then lists Habaruha, Kutila, Tarbiṣu, Kudina, Remaku and Nagabbilhi. Of these only Tarbiṣu is known, a town a short distance from Nineveh. The residents of Halahhu seem to have borne the brunt of his wrath as he claimed to have killed 254,000 of them, a fairly preposterous boast even for the period. He then turned westward into The Levant (modern Syria and Lebanon), where he subjugated the Suteans, the Aḫlamû and the Yauru, the nomadic West Semitic tribesmen who would become the Arameans, in the region of Katmuḫi in the middle Euphrates.

But his activities were not limited to warfare. The temple of Šamaš at Aššur, as a mud-brick construction, had decayed into a mound of dirt surrounded by ad hoc shrines. “In order that the harvest of my land might prosper,” he had them cleared and rebuilt the temple, laying its foundation during the eponym year of Berutu, a son of the earlier king Eriba-Adad I. His own son credited him with the construction of the great Ziggurat of Aššur in one of his own building dedications.

Like his father, Enlil-nirari, before him he had to battle inconclusively against Babylonia, in this case against king Nazi-Maruttaš. His son was to recall “my father could not rectify the calamities inflicted by the army of the king of the Kassite land” in a contemporary Assyrian epic. That dispute was finally resolved with his son, Adad-nirari I's victory over the Babylonians at the Battle of Kār Ištar.

| Preceded by Enlil-nirari | King of Assyria; 1317–1306 BC | Succeeded by Adad-nirari I |
