= Land grant to Marduk-apla-iddina I by Meli-Shipak II =

Ancient Mesopotamian entitlement stele

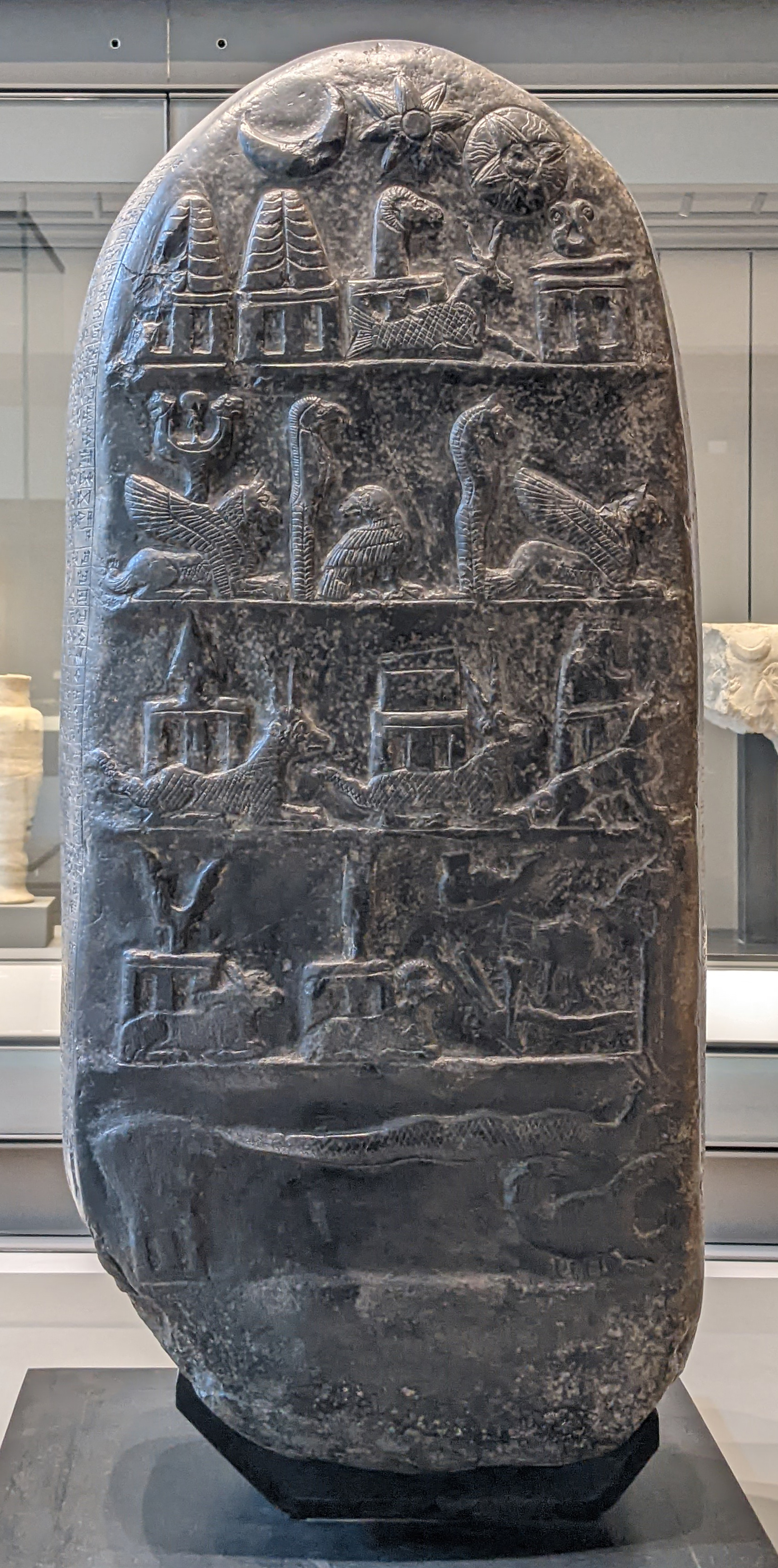
- Material: Limestone
- Height: c. 76 cm
- Width: 42 cm
- Created: c. 1180 BC
- Discovered: 1899; Shush, Khuzestan, Iran
- Present location: Paris, Ile-de-France, France

The Land grant to Marduk-apla-iddina kudurru is a grey limestone 0.7-meter tall ancient Mesopotamian narû or entitlement stele recording the gift of four tracts of cultivated land with settlements totaling 84 GUR 160 qa by Kassite king of Babylon, Meli-Šipak (c. 1186–1172 BC), to a person described as his servant (arassu irīm: "he granted his servant") named Marduk-apla-iddina, who may be his son and/or successor or alternatively another homonymous individual. The large size of the grant together with the generous freedom from all territorial obligations (taxation, corvée, draft, foraging) has led historians to assume he was the prince. There are thirty six kudurrus which are placed on the basis of art-history to Meli-Šipak's reign, of which eight are specifically identified by his name. This is the best preserved of all of them.

== The stele ==
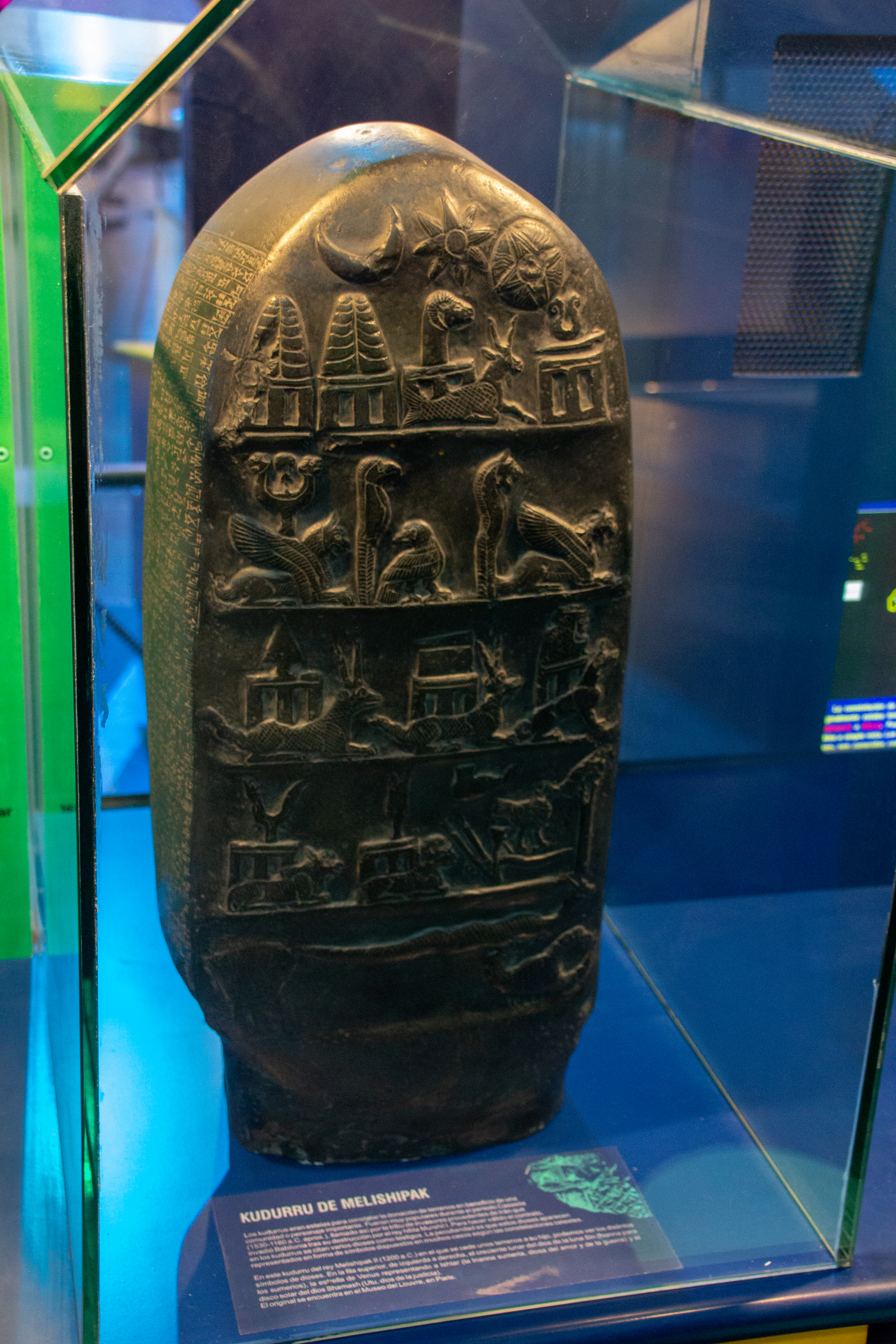
Replica of the stele at the Museum of Science and the Cosmos, Tenerife

The kudurru was recovered in 1899 from Susa, excavation reference Sb 22, by the French archaeological expedition under the auspices of Jacques de Morgan and brought to the Musée du Louvre where it still resides. The object is inscribed on three sides in seven columns and 387 lines. Like most kudurrus, it portrays Mesopotamian gods graphically in segmented registers on the stone. In this case the divine icons number twenty-four in five registers, rather more than usual.

The bequest was for communal land of the city of Agade located around the settlement of Tamakku adjacent to the royal canal in Bīt-Piri’-Amurru, a province in northern Babylonia. In a passage granting exemptions from service and taxation to the residents of the transferred territory, a list of officials are forbidden from appropriating the land and levying labor with restrictions placed on their conduct. This includes the king himself, the šakin māti (the governor of the land), and the pīḫātu (rank uncertain) of Bīt-Piri’-Amurru, contradicting the image of oriental despotism sometimes portrayed concerning the period.

The text concludes with an unusual series of blessings and curses including a rather gruesome curse of Gula, "may she place in his body her oozing (sores), a persistent carbuncle, of no release, so that, for as long as he lives, he may bathe in blood and pus like water!", which seems to have been reproduced on the Stele of Meli-Šipak. There are no witnesses listed to validate the bequest, more evidence to suggest it was a gift between royalty.

=== The cast of characters ===
- Meli-Šipak, the king, donor
- Marduk-apal-iddina, his servant, beneficiary

The survey team:

- Ibni-Marduk, "son (=descendant) of Arad-Ea", presumably the šādid eqli, or field surveyor, as he appears as such on the land grant to Ḫasardu kudurru
- Šamaš-nādin-šumi, son of Arad-nubatti, ša rēš šarri (^{lú}SAG LUGAL), a court official
- Šamaš-šum-līšir, son of Ultu-ilu, ḫazannu, or mayor, of Bīt-Pir’i-Amurru province

=== Divine symbols ===
The iconic representations of the gods, where they are known, are given in the sequence left-to-right, top-to-bottom:

Top register:
1. Sîn – crescent moon
2. Šamaš – sun-disc
3. Ištar – Venus-star
4. Anu – shrine with tiara
5. Enlil – shrine with tiara
6. Ea – goat-fish in front of shrine
7. Shrine with a nail or dagger

Second register:

8. Ninurta – double lion-headed symbol
9. Zababa – vulture-headed symbol
10. Kassite deity Ḫarbe – bird looking backwards
11. Nergal – lion-headed symbol
12. Crouching dragon with wings

Third register:

13. Marduk – Mušmaḫḫū crouched before shrine with spade
14. Nabû – horned dragon before brick shrine with wedge
15. Gula – dog before shrine with bust

Fourth register:

16. Adad – bull reclining beneath lightning bolt
17. Crouching ram with chisel on shrine
18. Nusku – lamp
19. Plough with double-handle
20. Bau – the walking bird
21. Šuqamuna and Šumalia – bird on a perch

Fifth register:

22. Shrine with sea-shell
23. Ištarān – coiled snake
24. Išḫara – scorpion

=== Principal publications ===
- V. Scheil (1900). Mémoires de la Délégation en Perse, Tome II: Textes Élamites - Sémitiques. Paris. pp. 99–111. pl. 21–24 translation and photographs
- W. J. Hinke (1911). Selected Babylonian Kudurru Inscriptions. E. J. Brill. pp. 4–14. line art

== See also ==
- Melišipak–(Meli-Shipak II)
- Kudurru
