= Nazimaruttaš kudurru stone =

Ancient boundary stone

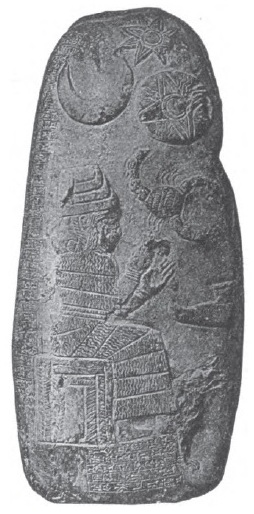
- Created: c. 1295 BC
- Discovered: Shush, Khuzestan, Iran
- Present location: Paris, Île-de-France, France

The Nazimaruttash kudurru stone is a boundary stone (kudurru) of Nazimaruttaš, a Kassite king of Babylon, c. 1307–1282 BC (short chronology). It was found at Susa and is now displayed at the Louvre.

Some kudurrus are known for their portrayal of the king, etc., who consigned it. Most kudurrus portray Mesopotamian gods, often portrayed graphically in segmented registers on the stone. Nazimaruttash's kudurru does not use registers; instead, graphic symbols are used. Nineteen deities are invoked to curse the foolhardy individual who seeks to desecrate it. Some are represented by symbols, such as a goat-fish for Enki, a bird on a pole for Papsukkal, a spear-head for Marduk, an eight-pointed star for Ishtar, and a disc for Shamash.
