= Kusarikku =

Ancient Mesopotamian mythological demon

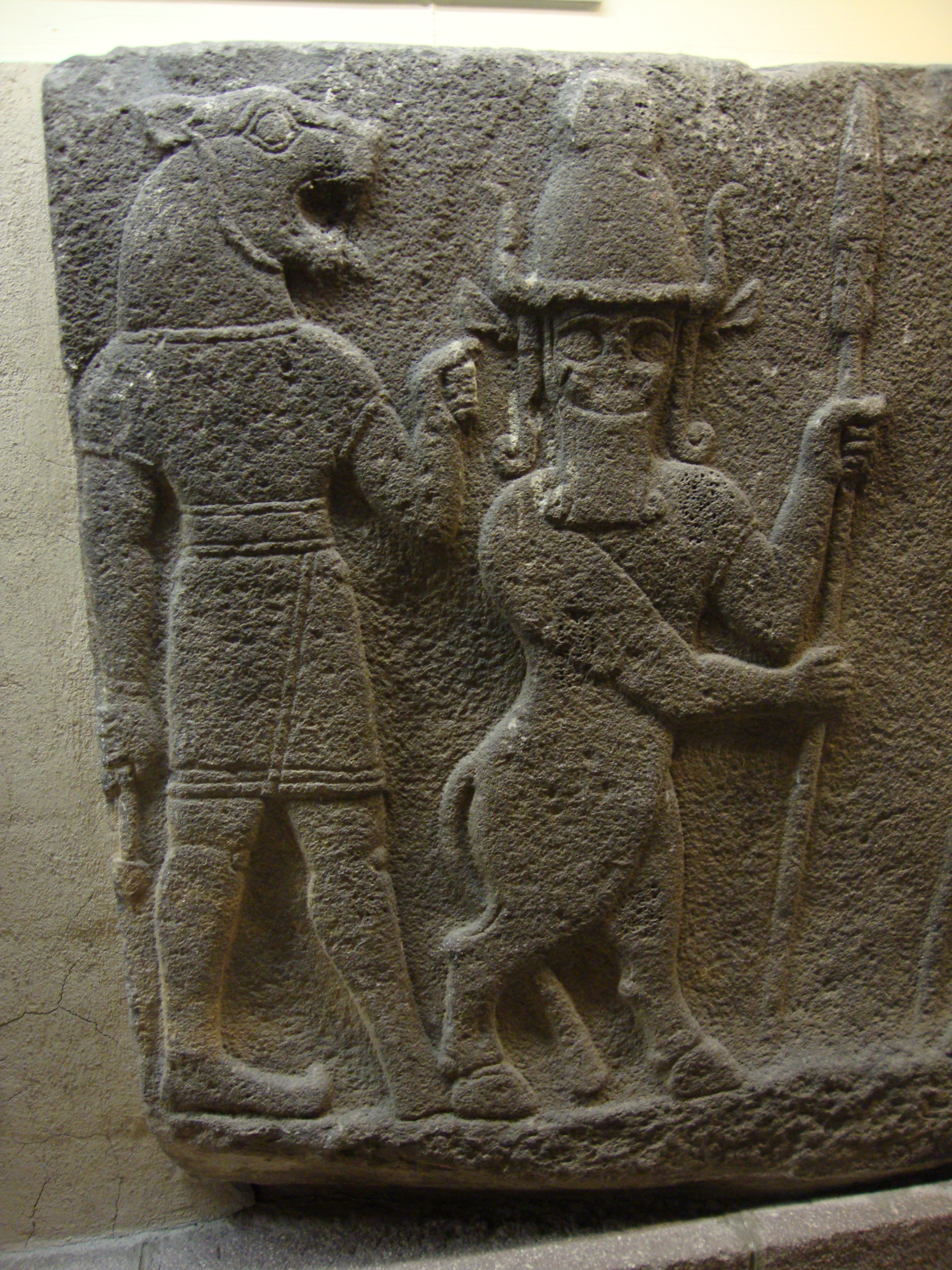
A kusarikku on the right holding a lance with an ugallu on the left on a Hittite relief from Carchemish.

Kusarikku ("Bull-Man") (Note: Sometimes inscribed GUD.DUMU.^{d}UTU, GUD.DUMU.AN.NA and sometimes phonetically ku-sa-rik-ku(m), synonymous with the Sumerian GU_{4}/gud-alim and perhaps also alim (see below for caveat).) was an ancient Mesopotamian mythological demon shown in artistic representation from the earliest (late Uruk period) times with the arms, torso and head of a human and the ears, horns and hindquarters of a bull. He is portrayed as walking upright and characterized as a door keeper to protect the inhabitants from malevolent intruders. He is one of the demons which represented mountains. He is pictured in late iconography holding a banduddû, "bucket". On a stela of Meli-Šipak, the land grant to Ḫasardu kudurru, he is pictured carrying a spade.

== Mythology ==
In the Sumerian myth, Angim or "Ninurta's return to Nippur", the god "brought forth the Bison (gud-alim) from his battle dust" and "hung the Bison on the beam". He is one of Tiāmat's offspring vanquished by Marduk in the Epic of Creation, Enûma Eliš. In the prologue of the Anzû Myth, Ninurta defeats the kusarikku "in the midst of the sea". In an incantation against the evil eye of the Lamaštu, an incantation meant to soothe a crying child, kusarikku is portrayed as being negeltû, "roused", and gullutu, "frightened". Along with Ugallu, Girtablullû, and others, are some of the apkallu shown on neo-Assyrian palace reliefs, and with figurines – to guard against the influence of evil spirits. The constellation of kusarikku, or gud-alim, corresponds to part of Centaurus.

He was associated with the god of justice, Šamaš, along with Girtablullû, the "Scorpion-Man", and alim, the "Bison". There were three species of ungulates in Mesopotamia: the Aurochs, the Bison, and the Water buffalo, and it is not always certain as to which of these was represented in some of the earlier text references. There seems to have been a distinction between the Sumerian terms gud-alim, "bison-man", and alim, "human-faced bison".

== See also ==
- Bull of Heaven
- Lamassu
