= Eanna-shum-iddina =

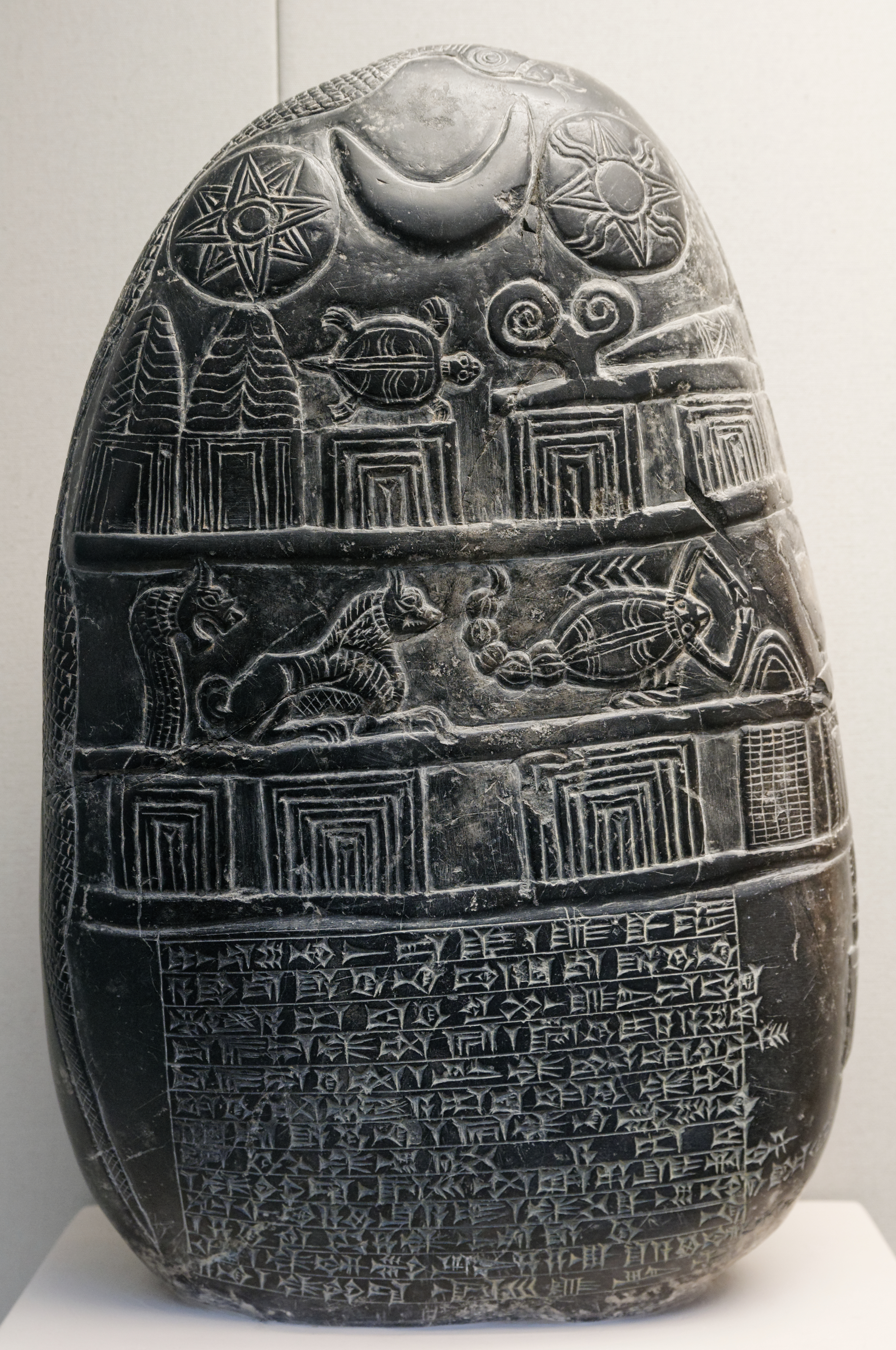
Kudurru recording Eanna-shum-iddina's land grant, British Museum

Eanna-shum-iddina was a governor in the Sealand Dynasty of Babylon in the middle of the second millennium BC. Sealand was the region of southern Iraq, of the Tigris-Euphrates-(Mesopotamia) along the coast. Eanna-shum-iddina is known to have made at least one Kudurru boundary stone.

The Eanna-shum-iddina kudurru was a land grant to Gula-eresh, witnessed by his surveyor Amurru-bel-zeri. The iconography of the stone includes cuneiform text, two middle registers with gods, and a larger upper, scenic register of gods, with sky–glyph representations of gods.

The British Museum dates this kudurru to the period 1125–1100 BC.

== See also ==
- Eanna-shum-iddina kudurru
- Kudurru
