= Marduk-apal-iddina II kudurru =

The Marduk-apal-iddina II kudurru is a boundary stone (kudurru) of Marduk-apal-iddina II, who ruled Babylon from 722 BC - 710 BC.

Some kudurrus are known for their representations of the king, etc, who consigned the production. Most kudurrus represent Mesopotamian gods, which are often displayed graphically in segmented registers on the stone.

Marduk-apal-iddina's kudurru contains one register at the stones upper section. A series of gods are represented.

== See also ==
- Kudurru
- Marduk-apal-iddina II
