= Battle Beast =

Battle Beast may refer to:

- Battle Beast (video game), fighting game released for the PC
- Battle Beast (band), Finnish metal band
  - Battle Beast (album), self-titled album of the band above
- Battle Beasts, line of small figurine action figure toys, in the form of an anthropomorphised animal with body armor and a unique weapon
- Battle Beast (Invincible), a fictional character in Invincible and the Image Universe

== See also ==
- Beasts of battle, poetic trope in Old English and Old Norse literature
- Battle Bison beast, (from Sumerian gud-alim: bison bull), in Sumerian mythology, one of the Heroes slain by Ninurta, patron god of Lagash, in Mesopotamia
