= Kudurru for Šitti-Marduk =

Boundary stone of Nebuchadnezzar I of Babylon

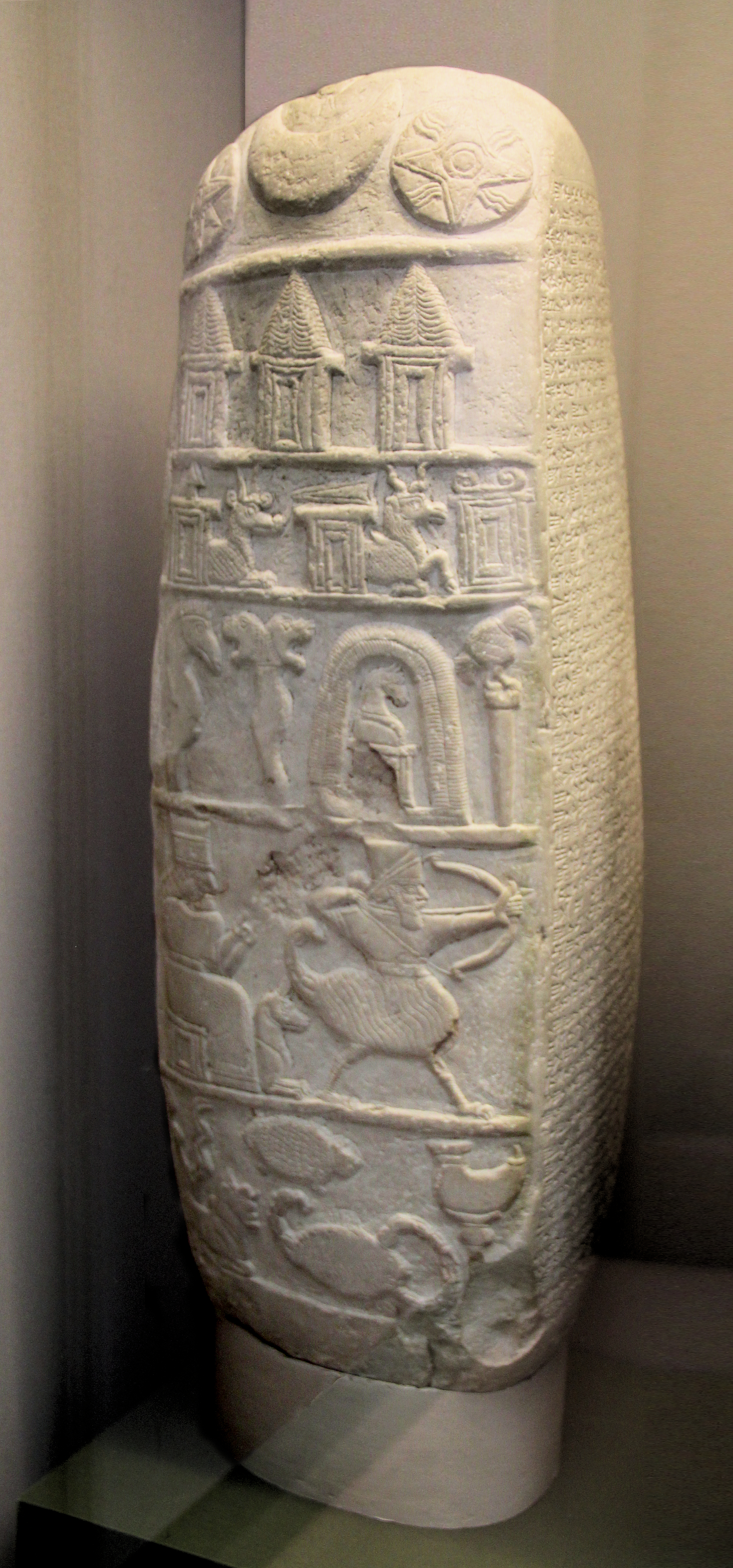
- Material: Limestone
- Created: c. 1150 BC
- Discovered: before 2008
- Present location: London, United Kingdom

The Kudurru for Šitti-Marduk is a white limestone boundary stone (Kudurru) of Nebuchadrezzar I, a king of the 2nd Dynasty of Isin, c. the late 12th century BC. He is known to have made at least four kudurru boundary stones.

Some kudurrus are known for their representations of the king, etc., who conscripted the stones production. Most kudurrus are attested by honored gods of Mesopotamia and are often displayed graphically in segmented registers on the stone.

The obverse of the Kudurru for Šitti-Marduk is composed of six registers, with gods, beings (a Scorpion man for example), etc. The recto contains cuneiform text, relating the military services of Šitti-Marduk.

== See also ==
- Kudurru
- Nebuchadnezzar I
