= Kudurrus of Marduk-nadin-ahhe =

Boundary stones of Babylonian king

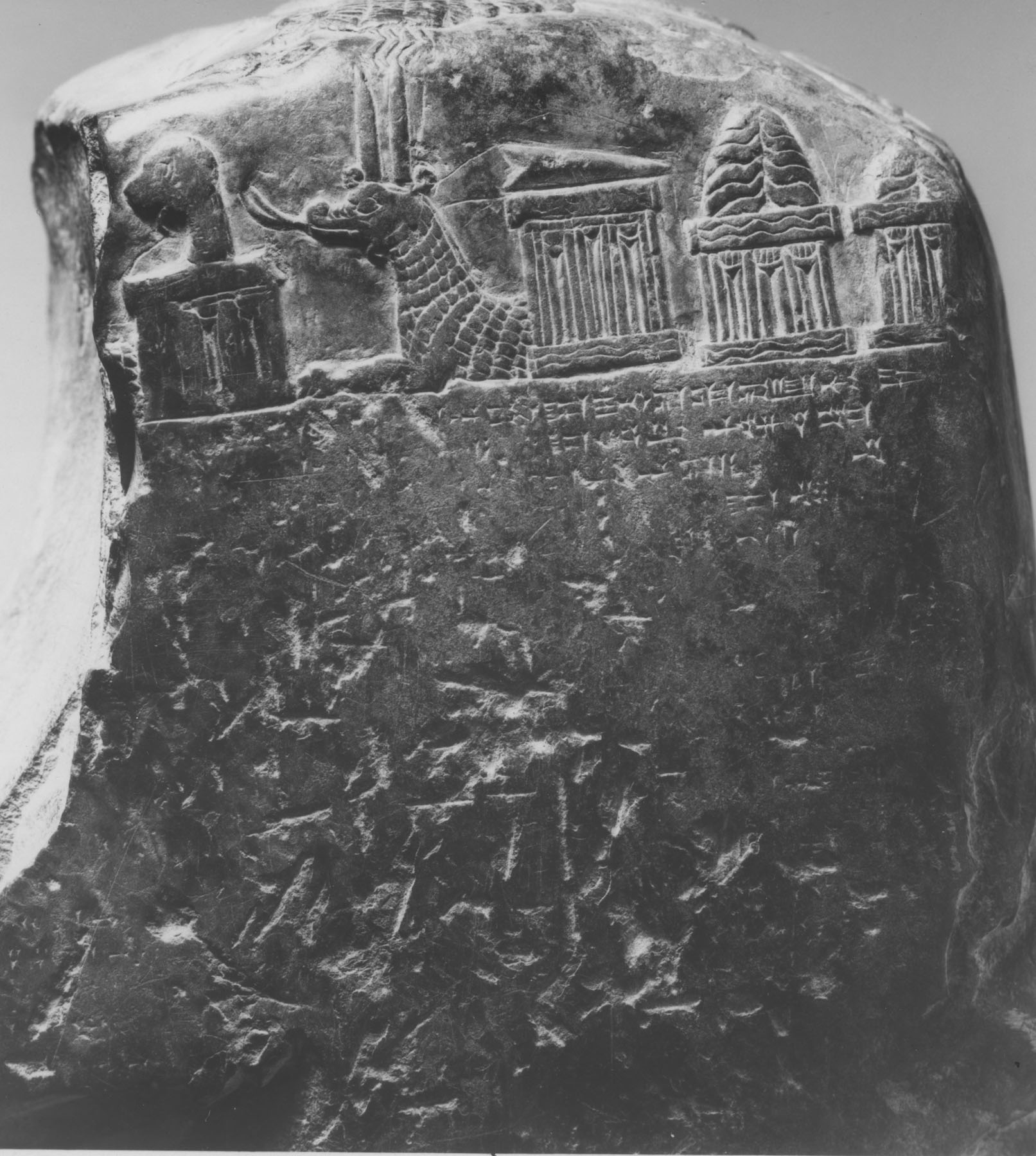
Walters Art Museum no. 2110 kudurru.

The Kudurrus of Isin (Babylonian Kingdom), king Marduk-nadin-ahhe, late 2nd millennium BC, c. 1099-1082 BC.

== British Museum kudurru ==
The British Museum kudurru is a black limestone boundary stone (kudurru) of Marduk-nadin-ahhe, who ruled ca. 1100 BC – 1082 BC in Dynasty IV of Babylon.

Some kudurrus are known for their representations of the king, etc., who consigned it. Most kudurrus represent Mesopotamian gods, which are often displayed graphically in segmented registers on the stone.

The Marduk-nadin-ahhe kudurru shows the king standing in royal garb, holding a bow and two arrows. Above his portrayal is one register displaying the gods represented on the boundary stone contract. A caption attests that he is the "Avenger of the People".

The obverse of the kudurru with King Marduk-nadin-ahhe is separated from the reverse by part of a snake, and a text in cuneiform comprises the reverse of the kudurru.

== Walters no. 2110 kudurru ==
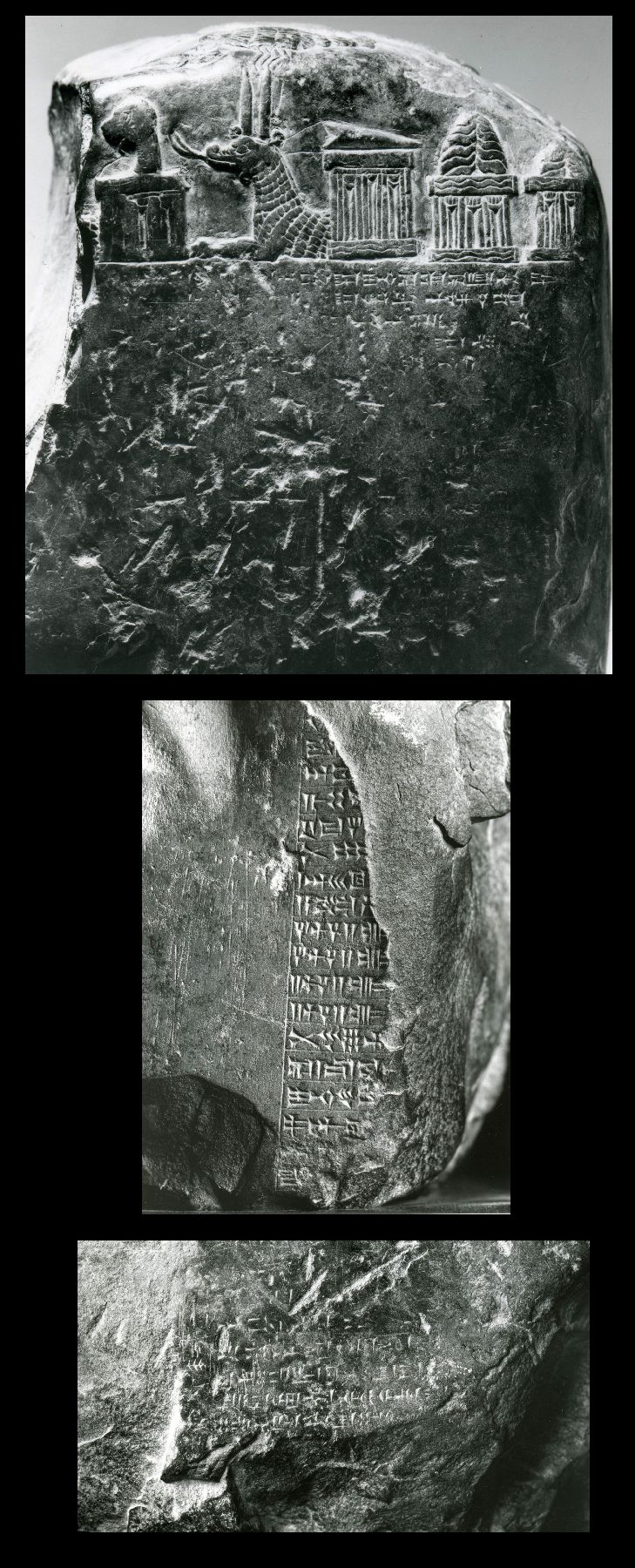

Walters museum no. 2110 is a damaged kudurru with parts in good shape, as well as legible cuneiform text.

== Deed kudurru, Marduk-nasir ==
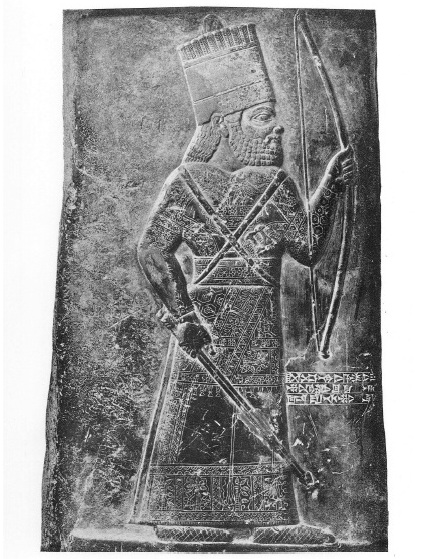
Marduk-nasir deed kudurru (king's officer).

A deed (kudurru) recording the purchase of five GUR of corn-land by Marduk-nasir, the king's officer. The kudurru appears to be a flat, inscribed stone type.

== Land grant to Adad-zer-iqiša ==
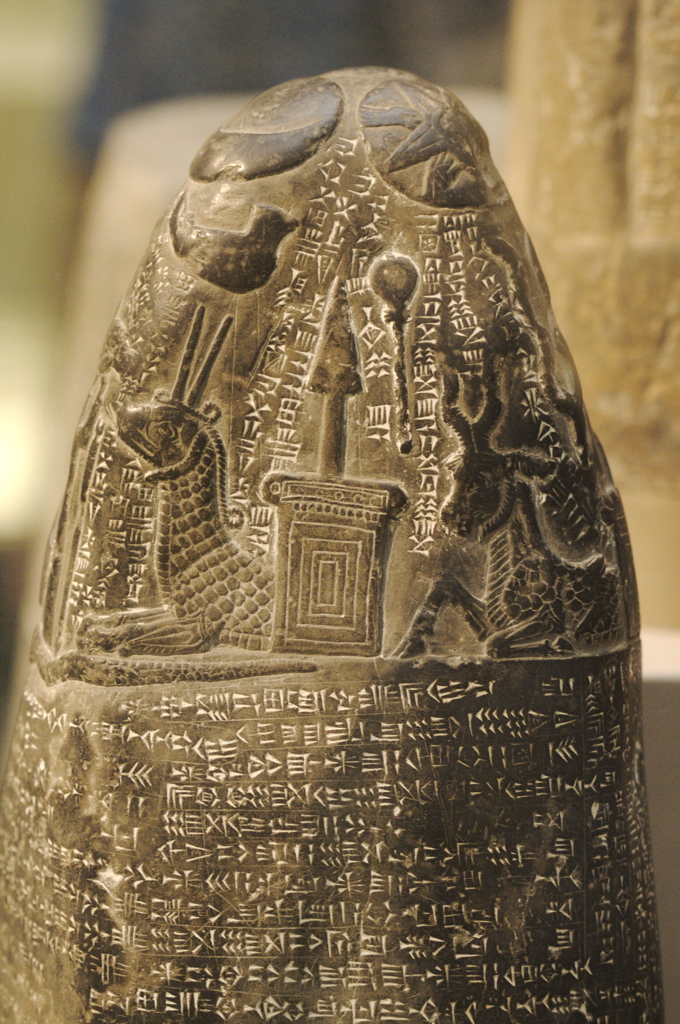
British Museum kudurru, Land grant to Adad-zer-iqiša kudurru.

The British Museum kudurru, Land grant to Adad-zer-iqiša, is a large, stone kudurru, in fine shape, with multiple images of gods, and their iconic graphic symbols; the gods, and symbols encircle the top, approximately cone, circle-shaped top of the kudurru. Cuneiform is written amongst the graphic symbols of the upper cone. An extensive cuneiform script, below an encircling register line, around the top cone, tells the story of the kudurru.

== See also ==
- Marduk-nadin-ahhe
- Kudurru
