= Šandabakku =

The office of šandabakku, inscribed Sumerian: 𒇽𒄘𒂗𒈾, romanized: ^{LÚ}GÚ.EN.NA) (Note: Lexical lists such as IM 77106, 12 N 129 OIP 122 text 119, obv.4.) or sometimes as 𒂷𒁾𒁀𒀀𒂗𒆤𒆠 (GÁ.DUB.BA.A EN.LÍL^{KI}), the latter designation perhaps meaning "archivist of (the god) Enlil," was the name of the position of governor of the Mesopotamian city of Nippur from the Kassite period (mid second millennium BC) onward. Enlil, as the tutelary deity of Nippur, had been elevated in prominence and was shown special veneration by the Kassite monarchs, it being the most common theophoric element in their names. This caused the position of the šandabakku to become very prestigious and the holders of the office seem to have wielded influence second only to the king.

== The office ==
The term šandabakku first appears in texts from Mari, where it seems to represent a high-ranking administrative official, but it is not until the Kassite period that it became synonymous with the city of Nippur. Nippur had been depopulated sometime towards the end of the reign of Samsu-iluna (ca. 1686–1648 BC, short chronology) and remained abandoned until the end of the fifteenth century when the Kassites began a program of restoration of cultic centers. The earliest inscriptions of this restoration belong to Kurigalzu I.

The office may be related in some manner to that of the nišakku (Sumerian: 𒇽𒉡𒀊, romanized: ^{LÚ}NU.ÈŠ) of Enlil, probably the senior priestly or dignitary position of the Ekur. Whether the post was held concurrently with that of the šandabakku, or at some, perhaps, earlier stage in the career of the prospective governor, has yet to be determined, but it is clear that Enlil-kidinni and his immediate successors, all held both offices, and Amil-Marduk and Enlil-šuma-imbī were similarly honored. Only during the reign of Nazi-Maruttaš, were they held by separate individuals, with Nūr-Delebat and his son Ninurta-rēṣušu assuming the nišakku-priest position, the latter of whom naming Enlil-kidinni’s father Enlil-bānī and Amīlatum as ancestors, on his clay quadrangular prism, (Note: BM 92699, votive prism.) a votive dedication to the storm-god Adad.

The most prominent of the šandabakku officials were - Enlil-kidinni, who corresponded (Note: Tablet CBS 19796, BE XVII no. 91.) and exchanged gifts with the Assyrian crown prince Enlil-nirari, if his name has been correctly restored, and, Amil-Marduk around a hundred years later, under whose rule Nippur experienced significant restoration work undertaken by servile laborers whose purchase documents and ration lists make up much of the so-called “governor's library.” In the later Achaemenid period, from the reign of Xerxes I, the title was replaced by that of the paqdu.

=== List of šandabakku officials at Nippur ===
The šandabakku’s who held office during the Kassite period:

- Amīlatum, father of Enlil-bāni (uncertain date)
- Uššur-ana-Marduk, son of Usi-ana-nuri-^{?} (uncertain position in sequence, but early) (Note: Cylinder seal of Uballissu-Marduk BM 122696.)
- Ninurta-nādin-aḫḫē, son of Enlil-bānī (from Kadašman-Enlil I until Burna-Buriaš, 1359–1333 BC)
- Enlil-kidinni, son of Ninurta-nādin-aḫḫē (from Burna-Buriaš, through Kurigalzu II, 1332–1308 BC, until early Nazi-Maruttaš, 1307–1282 BC)
- Enlil-alsa, son of Enlil-kidinna (attested in Nazi-Maruttaš year 8, 1300 BC (Note: Tablet UM 29-15-653.))
- Uzi-Šu[gab] (during Nazi-Maruttaš’ reign) (Note: CBS 12914, BE 14, no. 39, line 1.)
- Nazi-Enlil (during Nazi-Maruttaš’ reign)
- Ninurta-apla-idinna, son of Nazi-Enlil (Nazi-Maruttaš or later, Kadašman-Turgu, 1281–1264 BC, Kadašman-Enlil, 1263–1255 BC)
- Amil-Marduk (from Kudur-Enlil, 1254–1246 BC, until Šagarakti-Šuriaš’ reign, 1245–1233 BC)
- Enlil-zākir-šumi (Note: The Estate of Takil-ana-ilīšu kudurru, BM 90827.) (during the reign of Adad-šuma-iddina, 1222–1217 BC)
- Enlil-šuma-imbī, son of Daian-Marduk (during the reign of Adad-šuma-uṣur, 1216–1187 BC)

The officials with this title in the post-Kassite period:

- Nusku-zêra-iddina (Note: Legal tablet BM 139424.) (Nabû-šumu-libūr year 1 or 1033 BC)
- Nazi-Enlil (Note: Kudurru AO 6684 in the Louvre, published as RA 16 (1919) 125–126.) (during Marduk-zâkir-šumi’s reign, 855-819 BC)
- Enlil-apla-uṣur, son of Nazi-Enlil (during the reign of Marduk-balāssu-iqbi, 819–813 BC)
- Kudurru (during the reigns of Nabu-naṣir, 747–732 BC, and Nabû-mukin-zēri, 731–729 BC)
- Ēṭeru and Ērešu (around the time of Kudurru)
- ? Šuma-idinna (executed by Esarhaddon in his sixth year, 675 BC)
- Enlil-bāni, Šamaš-šum-ukin's seventh year, c. 660 BC
- Enlil-šāpik-zēri (apparently of Ṣurru near Uruk and not actually Nippur, during the reign of Nabû-kudurri-uṣur II, 634-562 BC)
- Nabû-šumu-ēreš (during the reign of Nabû-naʾid, 556-539 BC)
- Širiktu-Ninurta (from last year of Nabû-naʾid [539 BC] until the accession year of Darius I [522 BC])
