= Kudurru of Gula =

Ancient artifact

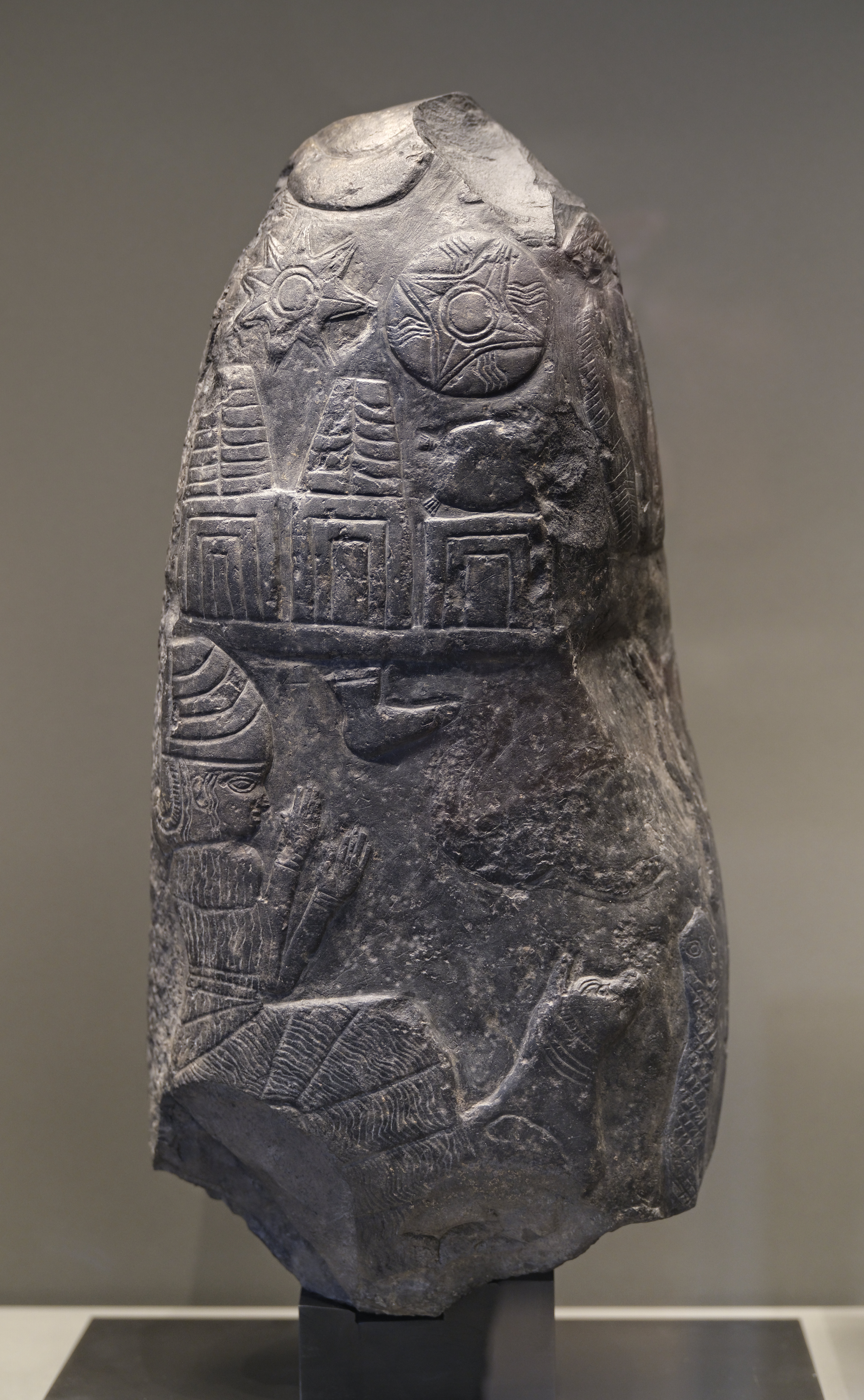
- Created: c. 1300 BC
- Present location: Paris, Île-de-France, France

The Kudurru of Gula is a boundary stone (Kudurru) for the Babylonian goddess Gula. Gula is the goddess of healing. It is from the 14th - 13th century BC Kassite Babylonia, and is located at the Louvre.

The Kudurru of Gula shows Gula seated on her chair with her dog adjacent. Another side of the kudurru has registers representing symbols of gods, and also sections of cuneiform text.

== See also ==
- Kudurru
- Nintinugga
