= Stele of Meli-Šipak =

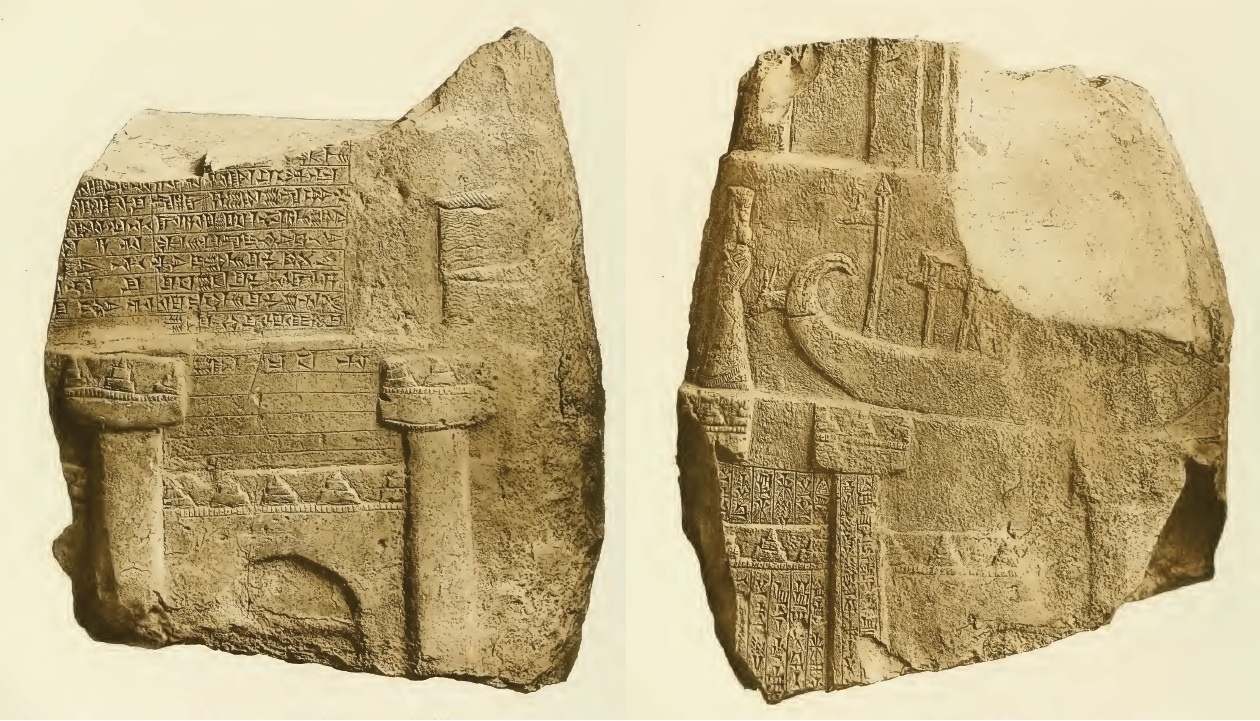
- The Stele of Meli-Sipak identified by a colophon provided by Elamite king Sutruk-Nahhunte
- Created: c. 1200 BC
- Discovered: c. 1902; Shush, Khuzestan, Iran
- Present location: Paris, Ile-de-France, France

The Stele of Meli-Šipak is an ancient Mesopotamian fragment of the bottom part of a large rectangular stone edifice engraved with reliefs and the remains of Akkadian and Elamite inscriptions. It was taken as spoil of war by Elamite king Šutruk-Naḫḫunte I during his invasion of Babylonia which deposed Kassite king Zababa-šuma-iddina. It was one of the objects found at Susa between 1900 and 1904 by the French excavation team under Jacques de Morgan that seems to have formed part of an ancient Museum of trophies, or ex-voto offerings to the deity Inšušinak, in a courtyard adjacent to the main temple.

== The stele ==
The limestone stele is engraved with towers, crowning battlements and separating a crenelated wall fortification below, where there is an archway in the lower of perhaps three registers. At least one row of divine symbols appears in an upper register. A human figure dressed in an ornate fringed robe and a high crown of feathers, faces a ship. A standing nude figure has been intentionally chiseled away.

The object was first published by Jean-Vincent Scheil in 1902 and is currently kept in the Musée du Louvre in Paris, with excavation reference Sb 14 and Museum reference AS 6049. It is the colophon added by Šutruk-Naḫḫunte (one of several, but which is very similar to that inscribed on the Victory stele of Narām-Sîn), written perpendicular to the Middle Babylonian cuneiform and up one of the carved towers, which identifies it as an artifact of Meli-Šipak, as the remnants of the original inscription do not provide any historical information:

I (am) Šutruk-Naḫ[ḫunte, the son] of [Ḫalluduš-Inšušin]ak, the beloved servant [of (the god) Inšušinak], the king of Anzan [(and) Susa, the enlarge]er of [my realm, the caretaker of Elam, [the prince of Elam].As Inšušinak, [my god, instr]uct[ed me, I smote] (the land) Karintaš. [I] acquired the stele of Meli-[Šipak] in Kari[ntaš] [(and brought it to Elam)].

The royal name preserved is given by Brinkman as ^{m}˹Me-x˺ [ ] which he described as providing “little support for such an interpretation” while Slanski observed that the faint traces following ˹Me˺ conform rather well to the sign –li-. Little more of the text other than the tail end of the curse formula is preserved:

[Gula, mistress of] the gods, may she afflict him with her oozing (sores), a persistent carbuncle, so that he may bathe in blood and pus like water!

This is reminiscent of the curses which appear on column seven of the Land grant to Marduk-apal-iddina I kudurru, and provides the main reason for identifying this object within the genre of kudurrus, the Babylonian entitlement narûs.
