= Meli-Shipak II =

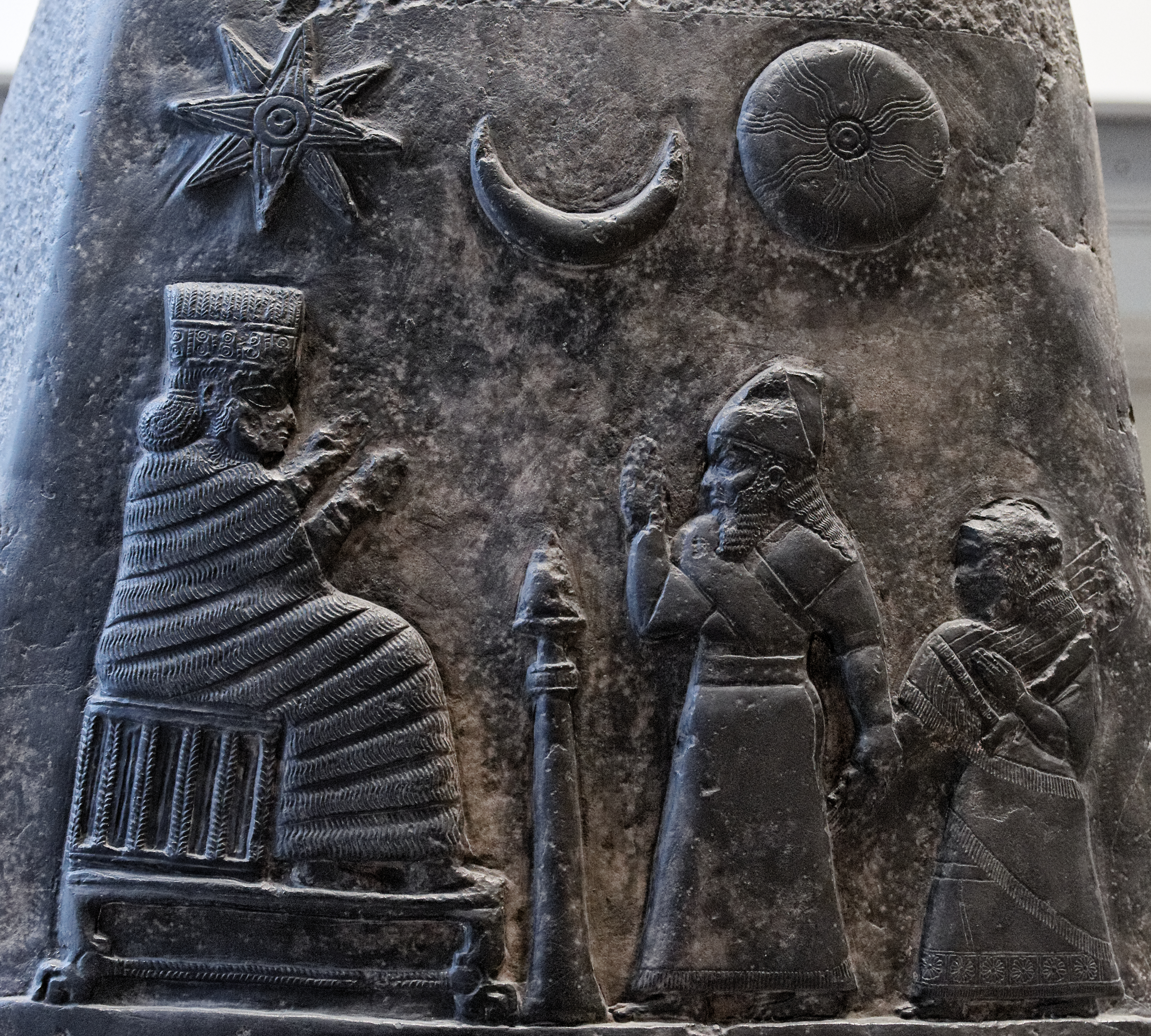
- Meli-Shipak II on a kudurru-Land presenting his daughter Ḫunnubat-Nanaya to the goddess Nanaya. The eight-pointed star was Inanna-Ishtar's most common symbol. Here it is shown alongside the solar disk of her brother Shamash (Sumerian Utu) and the crescent moon of her father Sin (Sumerian Nanna) on a boundary stone of Meli-Shipak II, dating to the twelfth century BC. (Note: Land grant to Ḫunnubat-Nanaya kudurru, Sb 23, published as MDP X 87, found with Sb 22 during the French excavations at Susa.)

King of Babylon
- Reign: c. 1186–1172 BC
- Predecessor: Adad-shuma-usur
- Successor: Marduk-apla-iddina I
- Died: c. 1172 BC
- Issue: Marduk-apla-iddina I Ḫunnubat-Nanaya
- Father: Adad-shuma-usur

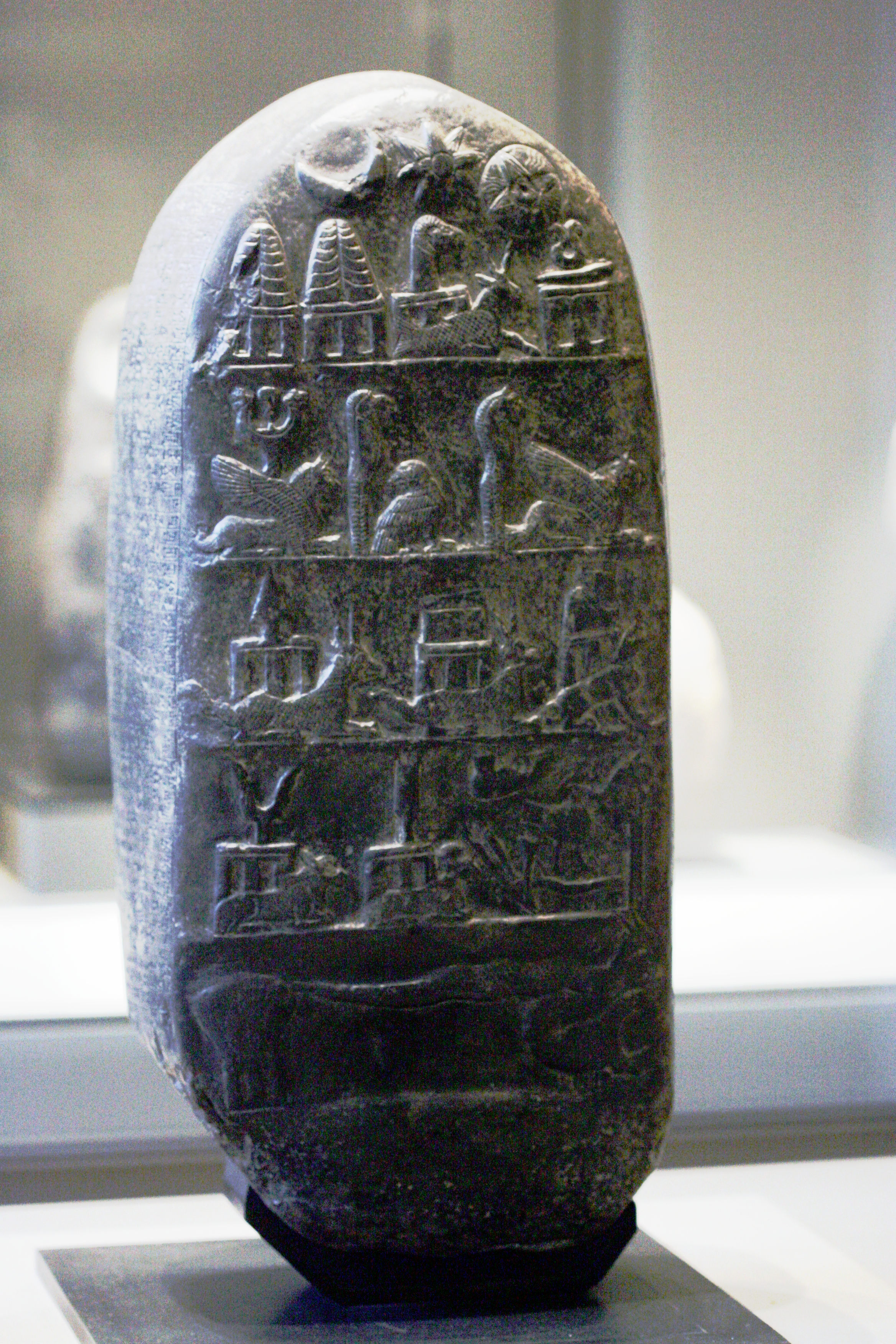
Melišipak kudurru: Land grant to Marduk-apal-iddina I (Note: Melišipak kudurru-Land grant to Marduk-apal-iddina I, Sb 22, published as MDP II 99, found during the French excavations at Susa.)

Meli-Šipak II, or alternatively Melišiḫu (Note: Me-li-^{d}ŠI-ḪU or ^{m}Me-li-ŠI-ḪU, where the reading of ḪU is uncertain, -ḫu or -pak.) in contemporary inscriptions, was the 33rd king of the Kassite or 3rd Dynasty of Babylon c. 1186–1172 BC and ruled for 15 years. (Note: Kinglist A, BM 33332, ii 12.) Tablets with two of his year names, 4 and 10, were found at Ur. His reign marks the critical synchronization point in the chronology of the Ancient Near East.

== His provenance ==
He is recorded as the son of Adad-šuma-uṣur, his predecessor, on a kudurru. (Note: Estate of Takil-ana-ilīšu kudurru, BM 90827, published as BBSt 3, column 4, line 31, but note King’s 1912 edition uses the alternative reading of the cuneiform –MU-ŠEŠ to give Adad-nadin-aḫi.) Elsewhere he seemed reluctant to name him in his royal inscriptions, despite Adad-šuma-uṣur’s apparent renown as restorer of Kassite independence, which has been the subject of much speculation amongst historians.

The “II” designation is possibly an error caused by over reliance on a single inscription (Note: ”Knob” of red stone with votive inscription, BE 6378.) naming one Meli-Šipak, son (=descendant) of Kurigalzu II. He was the last king to bear a wholly Kassite name. Meli means servant or slave, Šipak was a moon god, but Šiḫu was possibly one of the Kassite names for Marduk.

== Significance to Near Eastern chronology ==
At various points in the sequence of Assyrian and Babylonian kings, references are made by one king to their contemporary. Not until the reign of Meli-Šipak, however, do these connections allow a firm placement in time, which has led Malcolm Wiener to declare:

Confirmation of the firm foundation of Near Eastern chronology was provided recently by the discovery at Assur of his correspondence with Ninurta-apil-Ekur of Assur (FRAHM n.d.), thus confirming the overlap of these reigns as required by the independent chronologies of Assur and Babylon set forth over thirty years ago by J. Brinkman.

— Malcolm H. Wiener, Egypt & Time

The length of Ninurta-apil-Ekur’s reign is uncertain, as extant copies of the Assyrian King List differ, between three or thirteen years. From the reign of his son and successor, Aššur-dan I, they are consistent, and supported by extant limmu lists from 892 BC on.

== Bronze Age collapse ==
Meli-Shipak's rule is understood to have been peaceful. Not so for the edges of his kingdom, where the catastrophic collapse at the end of the Bronze Age was starting to dramatically unfold with many of the cities of the Levant experiencing destruction. The city of Emar, situated in northern Syria, was sacked and a legal document (Note: Legal text Msk. 73273.) was found on the floor in a private house there, dated to his second year. The tablet (Emar 26, found in House 5 of Chantier A)) was made of local clay and is a short-term contract involving a teacher, Kidin-Gula. Historian Daniel Arnaud has concluded that only a very short time (“weeks”) elapsed between its preparation and the cataclysmic destruction of the city by “hordes of enemies”.

Despite the carnage wrought by the times on mighty empires such as that of the Hittites, whose capital Hattusa was sacked around the middle of his reign, there continued to be scribal and construction activity in Babylonia. A divination text (Note: Omen text BM 108874.) lists 25 omens determined by the flight path of a falcon, or surdû, and raven, or āribu, and was written by Bēl-nadin-šumi, son of Ila-ušaršanni, and dated the month of Araḫsamnu, the 8th day, the 3rd year, the 2nd year, (Note: MU.3.KÁM.2.KÁM.) using the curious double-dating formula adopted during his predecessor’s reign. It begins, “If a man goes off on his errand and a falcon crosses from the right of the man to the left of the man - he will attain his desire.” Meli-Šipak was responsible for building work on the Ekur at Nippur, (Note: Stamped bricks from altar of the Enlil temple, Nippur, from the Oriental Institute’s 1950 excavation.) the Egalmaḫ at Isin, and a later text, (Note: Temple inventory IM 57150.) a Neo-Babylonian temple inventory, records his benefactions at Ur.

== Relations with Elam ==
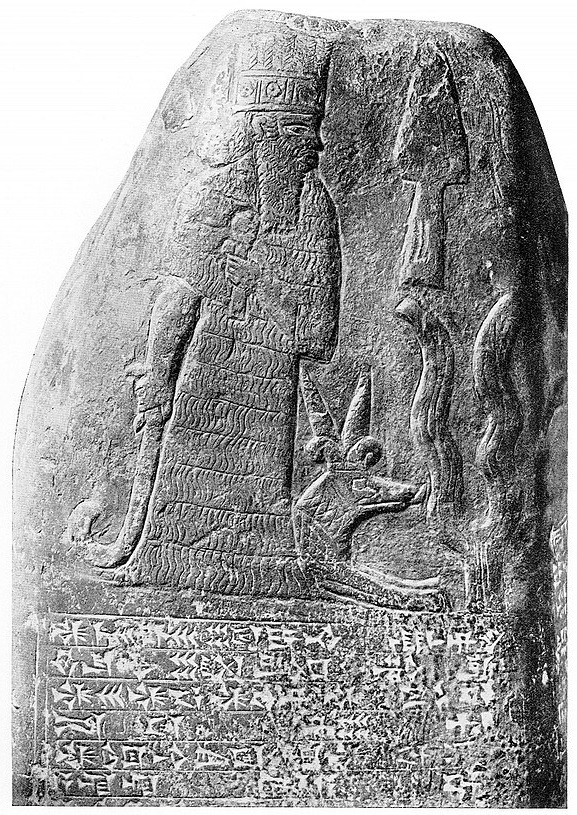
Stele of the time of Meli-Shipak

One of his daughters, allegedly the eldest, was married to the Elamite ruler Shutruk-Nahhunte. It was the latest in a series of diplomatic marriages between the Kassite rulers of Babylon and the Elamite Kings but was to have unforeseen consequences as it would lead Shutruk-Nahhunte to believe that he had a claim on the Babylonian throne. When he was to later invade and carry away plunder back to Susa, he would have additional inscriptions added to the objects he took in commemoration, for example:

I am Shutruk-Nahhunte, king of Elam. The god Inshushinak gave me the order...The city of Sippur I defeated...I plundered (lit. “brought into my hand”) the Stele of Naram-Sin and brought it back to Elam... The Stele of Meli-Šipak I plundered from [Kassite king] Karaindash and brought back to Elam...

— Shutruk Nahhunte, Royal Inscription

== The kudurru tradition ==
A boundary stone (kudurru) reports of his passing some land with tax exemptions to his son and successor Marduk-apal-iddina I (Land grant to Marduk-apal-iddina). His daughter Ḫunnubat-Nana(ya) was also the recipient of a land grant, which her father had purchased on her behalf, disproving the erstwhile theory of Kassite feudalism that all land belonged to the Monarch.

A kudurru records the lawsuits concerning the estate of Takil-ana-ilīšu over three reigns, spanning Adad-šuma-iddina, Adad-šuma-uṣur and Meli-Šipak. This is notable because Meli-Šipak upholds the decisions of both his predecessors, one of whom, Adad-šuma-iddina, may have been merely a vassal king of Assyrian patronage.

The proliferation of the kudurru tradition around this time suggests increased patronage from a monarch trying to bolster loyalty to his reign, perhaps to counter the problems of legitimacy or instability. A kudurru granting fifty gur of corn-land in the province of Bit-Pir'-Amurri by the king to Ḫa-SAR-du, an official or sukkal mu’irri, may be one such example, (Note: Land grant to Ḫasardu kudurru, BM 90829, published as BBSt 4, in the British Museum.) and the grant to [Me]li-Ḫala may be another. (Note: Land grant to [Me]li-Ḫala kudurru, Louvre 6373, published as MDP II 112.) A tablet records a rikiltu (grant, decree) issued by king Meli-Šipak in his second year of reign to the Sangü and the Satammu (temple administrator) of Ezida, a temple in Borsippa. (Note: Meli-Šipak's decree BM 38124 tablet in the British Museum.)

=== List of Meli-Šipak-dated kudurrus ===
- Land grant to Ḫunnubat-Nanaya kudurru
- Melišipak kudurru-Land grant to Marduk-apal-iddina I
- Land grant to Ḫasardu kudurru
- Land grant to [Me]li-Ḫala kudurru
- Estate of Takil-ana-ilīšu kudurru
- Unpublished kudurru (Note: Unpublished kudurru, mentioned in MDP I 180 no. 12.)
- Stele of Meli-Šipak with Šutruk-Naḫḫunte colophon (Note: Stele of Meli-Šipak with Šutruk-Naḫḫunte colophon, Sb 14, published as MDP IV 163.)
