= Land grant to Ḫunnubat-Nanaya kudurru =

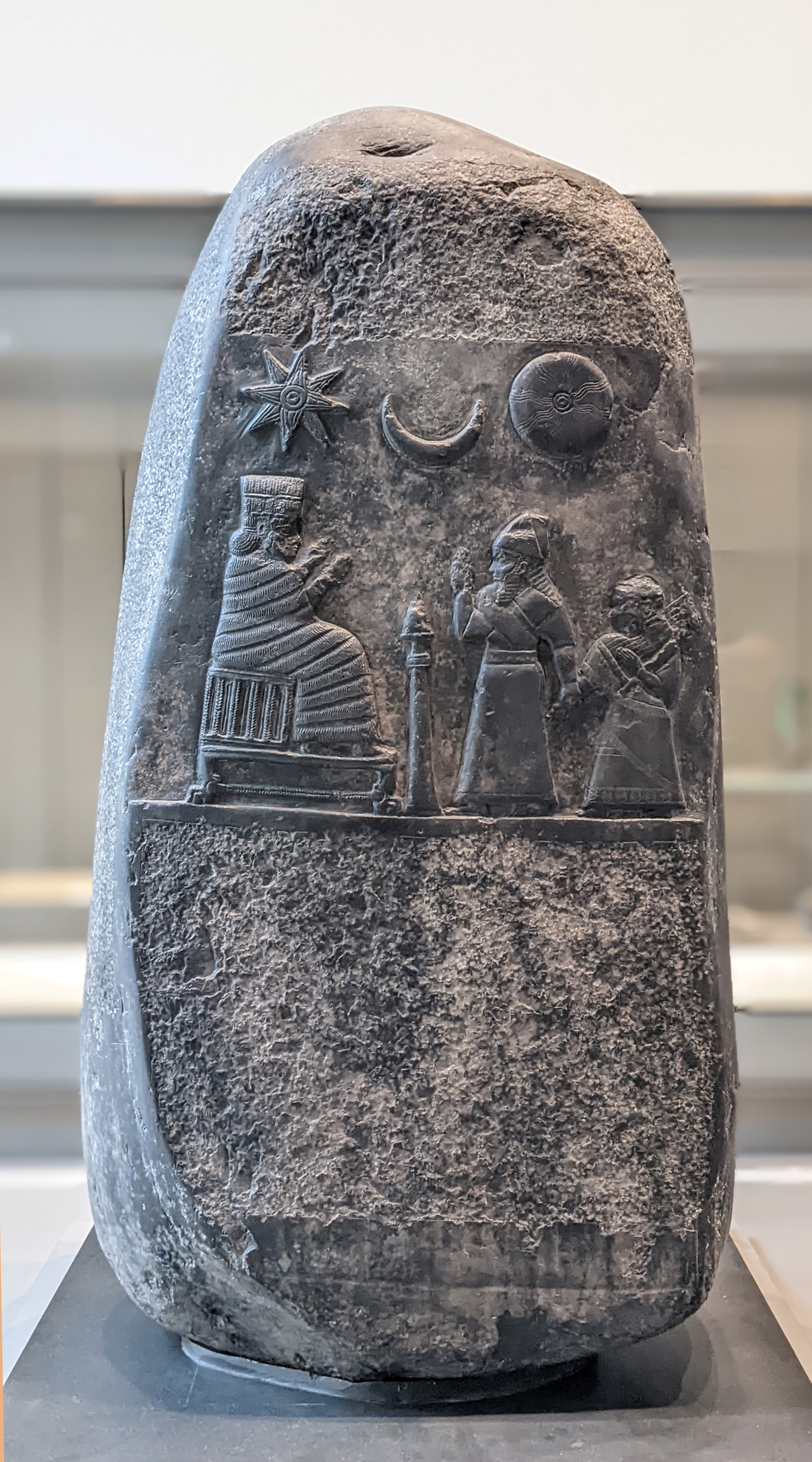
- Material: Limestone
- Height: 65 cm
- Width: 30 cm
- Created: c. 1180 BC
- Discovered: before 1909; Shush, Khuzestan, Iran
- Present location: Paris, Ile-de-France, France

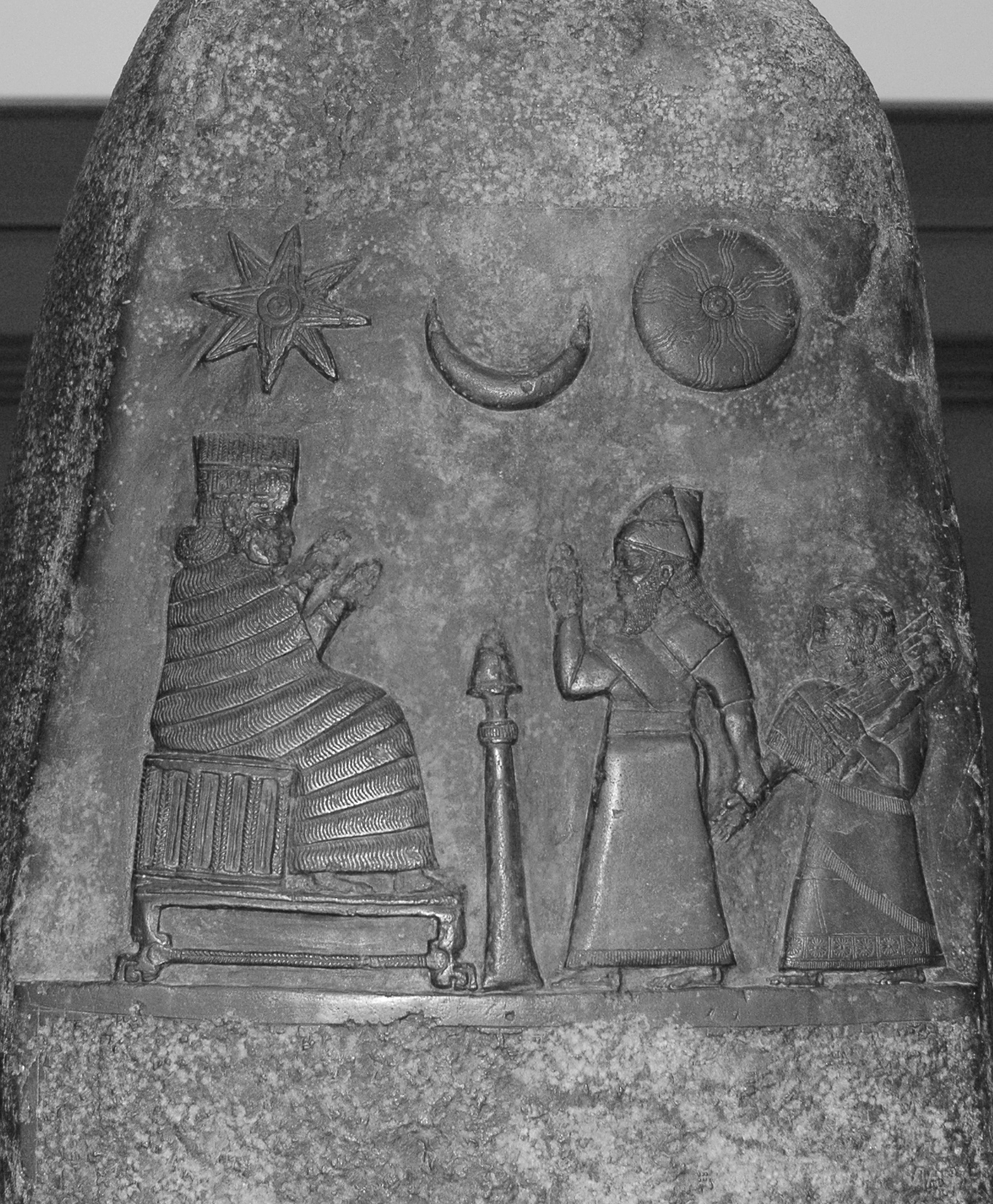
Meli-Šipak presents his daughter to the goddess Nannaya.

The Land grant to Ḫunnubat-Nanaya kudurru is an ancient Mesopotamian entitlement narû recording the gift of forty GUR (around a thousand acres) of uncultivated land and control over three settlements by Kassite king Meli-Šipak to his daughter and the provision of exemptions from service and taxation to villages in the region guaranteed with a sealed tablet given to her, presumably to make the land transfer more palatable to the local population. It was excavated by a French archaeological team under the auspices of Jacques de Morgan at the turn of the twentieth century at Susa where it (excavation reference Sb 23) was found with a duplicate (reference Sb 24). It had been taken as booty by Elamite king Šutruk-Naḫḫunte after his 1158 BC campaign that brought about the demise of the regime of Babylonian king Zababa-šuma-iddina, the penultimate monarch of the Kassite dynasty. It is significant in that it shows the king making a second bequest with land he purchased to provide for his beneficiary, contradicting the earlier view of Kassite feudalism, where all land belonged to the monarch.

== The stele ==
The rounded top, shaped kudurru is covered on three sides by an inscription of Meli–Šipak. On the fourth side, a rectangular recessed scene shows the king dressed in a long robe with his right hand raised in a gesture of greeting. With his left hand, he grasps the wrist of his daughter. The princess carries in her left hand a nine-stringed harp. Both face an enthroned goddess (Nanaya, a deity worshipped especially at Uruk) who is dressed in a flounced or segmented garment and donning a feathered mitre and sits on the far side of a cultic censer (inscribed: NÍG.NA; Akkadian: nignakku) on a stand. Apart from the area carved in relief, this side of the stele has been entirely defaced, possibly by an Elamite king intending to have his own inscription engraved. Only three divine icons remain, that of a star of Ištar, the crescent moon of Sîn and the sun-disc of Šamaš.

The surviving parts of the inscription describe an additional three-way real-estate transaction concerning a small orchard (of three GUR) in the Sealand where the vendor sells his property to the governor of the Sealand, presumably his overlord, who in turn passes it on to the king, thereby relinquishing all claim over its jurisdiction. The main bequest was located in the province of Malgû, on the Tigris, south of its confluence with the Diyala. A later literary work, known as the Berlin letter, provides a historical background where an Elamite king, who may be Šutruk-Naḫḫunte, claimed he married the eldest daughter of Meli–Šipak and this may be the purpose of this legal text, to arrange a substantial dowry for a diplomatic marriage, legitimized with the intercession of the goddess Nanaya. The subject matter of the second and third columns dwells on the provision of a prebend and ritual arrangements for the cult of deity, suggesting an alternative purpose for the bequest, that of elevating Ḫunnubat-Nanaya to a senior priestess position through the largesse of her father.

=== The cast of characters ===
- Meli-Šipak (the purchaser)
- Ḫunnubat-Nanaya (the beneficiary)
- Bêl-ana-kala-bani, the governor of Sealand (the intermediary)
- Naṣiru, son of Muštalu (the vendor)
- Uballiṭ-Marduk, scribe
- Nabû-naṣir, scribe
- Takišam-Gula (agent who compensates the scribes)
