= Estate of Takil-ana-ilīšu kudurru =

Mesopotamian stele

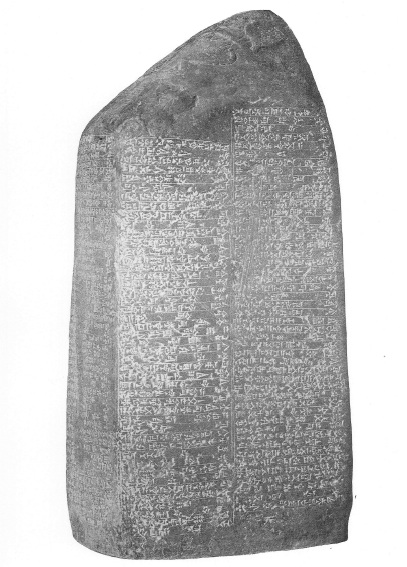
- Kudurru recording the legal wrangles over the land of Takil-ana-ilisu, who died intestate
- Created: c. 1170 BC
- Discovered: 1880; Hillah, Babylon, Iraq
- Discovered by: Hormuzd Rassam and Daud Thoma
- Present location: London, England, United Kingdom

The estate of Takil-ana-ilīšu kudurru is an ancient Mesopotamian white limestone narû, or entitlement stela, dating from the latter part of the Kassite era which gives a history of the litigation concerning a contested inheritance over three generations or more than forty years. It describes a patrimonial redemption, or "lineage claim", and provides a great deal of information concerning inheritance during the late Bronze Age. It is identified by its colophon, asumittu annītu garbarê šalati kanīk dīnim, "this stela is a copy of three sealed documents with (royal) edicts" and records the legal judgments made in three successive reigns of the kings, Adad-šuma-iddina (c. 1222–1217 BC), Adad-šuma-uṣur (c. 1216–1187 BC) and Meli-Šipak (c. 1186–1172 BC). It is a contemporary text which confirms the sequence of these Kassite monarchs given on the Babylonian king list and provides the best evidence that the first of these was unlikely to have been merely an Assyrian appointee during their recent hegemony over Babylonia by Tukulti-Ninurta I, as his judgments were honored by the later kings.

== The stela ==
The kudurru was excavated from the ruins of the Marduk temple in Babylon by Hormuzd Rassam and his chief foreman Daud Thoma in 1880 and is now in the British Museum assigned museum reference BM 90827. The text is inscribed on six columns on a two foot high stone block topped by a triangular apex carved with fifteen divine symbols.

The case begins "When the house of Takil-ana-ilīšu lapsed for want of an heir in the time of King Adad-šuma-iddina, King Adad-šuma-iddina gave the house (i.e. the estate) of Takil-ana-ilīšu to Ur-Nintinuga, brother of Takil-ana-ilīšu."

=== Deities invoked in curses ===
As was customary on such monuments, various deities were invoked to curse any party who might dispute the legal decision recorded on the kudurru. These included Anu, Enlil, and Ea (evil eye), Sîn, Šamaš, Adad and Marduk (tearing out the foundation); Ningursu and Bau (joyless fate), Šamaš and Adad (lawlessness); Pap-nigin-gara (destruction of the landmark), Uraš and Ninegal (evil); Kassite deities Šuqamuna and Šumalia (humiliation before the king and princes), Ištar (defeat); all the named gods (destruction of the name).

=== Cast of characters ===
The roles and readings of the names of the participants have changed since the first publication of the text and the identifications given here follow Paulus (2007), who argues that the outcome of the case hinges on the performance of the "River ordeal".

The protagonists:

- Takil-ana-ilīšu, the deceased, a barû or diviner
- Ur-Nintinuga, son of Sāmu, a fellow or "brother" barû to the deceased

Litigants and witnesses during the reign of Adad-šuma-iddina:

- Kidin-Ninurta, son of [I]luš[u-, son of the daughter of Takil-ana-ilīšu, first plaintiff, loses case
- Zāqip-Pap[nigara], "brother" of the deceased, second plaintiff, loses case
- Ninurta-muštāl, "brother" of the deceased, third plaintiff, loses case
- Enlil-zākir-šumi, the son of N[a-, šandabakku of Nippur, witness
- Kudurana, the son of Enlil-[. . . . .], witness
- sons of Ami[. . . . . . . . . .], witness

Litigants and witnesses under the reign of Adad-šuma-uṣur:

- Izkur-Ea, the son of Adallalu, the son of a daughter of Bit-Takil-ana-ilīšu, fourth plaintiff, loses case
- Enlil-šum-imbi, the son of Daian-Marduk, the nišakku-priest of Enlil, and šandabakku of Nippur, acts on King's instructions
- Takil-ana-ilīšu, the son of Ninurta-riṣûa, a bēl pīḫāti, provincial governor, an official sharing the name of the deceased, uncertain role
- Bēlānu, unwitting purchaser of 10 GUR of the estate, acquired from an unnamed son of the deceased
- Rīmūtu and Tābnūtu, the sons of Bēlānu, fifth and sixth plaintiffs, compensated following the redemption of the land
- Amīl-Nabû, the King's representative

Litigants and witnesses under the reign of Meli-Šipak:

- Aḫu-dārû, son of (the house of?) Enlil-kidinnī, seventh plaintiff, complains he was overlooked when young, forcibly seizes the land, and wins his case when he undergoes the river ordeal
- Marduk-kudurrī-uṣur, son of Ur-Nintinuga
- Nabû-šakin-šumi, uncertain relationship, but links Aḫu-dārû to the house of Enlil-kidinnī
- Enlil-nādin-šumu, son of Aḫu-dārû, eighth and last plaintiff, exchanges seizure for compensation after Marduk-kudurrī-uṣur is vindicated by a second river ordeal in Parak-māri

== Principal publications ==
- C. W. Belser (1894). "Babylonische Kudurru-Inschriften". In F. Delitzsch, Paul Haupt (ed.). Beiträge zur Assyriologie, II. J. C. Hinrichs. pp. 187–203. "Grenzstein" no. 103
- F. E. Peiser (1892). "Inschrift aus der Zeit der Könnige Rammân-šum-iddin, Rammân-nâdin-aḫi, Mili-Siḫu". In K. B. Schrader (ed.). Keilinschriftliche Bibliothek, III. Reuther & Reichard. pp. 154–163.
- L. W. King (1912). Babylonian Boundary Stones and Memorial-Tablets in the British Museum. British Museum. pp. 7–18, pls. V–XXII
- F. X. Steinmetzer (1922). Die babylonischen kudurru (Grenzsteine) als Urkundenform. no. 3
- Ursula Seidl (1989). Die Babylonischen Kudurru-Reliefs: Symbole Mesopotamischer Gottheiten. Academic Press Fribourg. no. 12
- Susanne Paulus (2012). Die babylonischen Kudurru-Inschriften von der kassitischen bis zur frühneubabylonischen Zeit (AOAT 396). Ugarit-Verlag. (Forthcoming)
