= Battle Bison beast =

The Bison-beast (from Sumerian: gud-alim 'bison bull') in Sumerian religion was one of the Heroes slain by Ninurta, patron god of Lagash, in Mesopotamia (ancient Iraq).

Its body was hung on the beam of Ninurta's chariot (lines 55–63).

== See also ==
- Bull of Heaven
- Kusarikku
- Lamassu
- Ninlil
- Sumerian religion
- Anzû
