= Kudurru =

Boundary stone in the ancient Near East

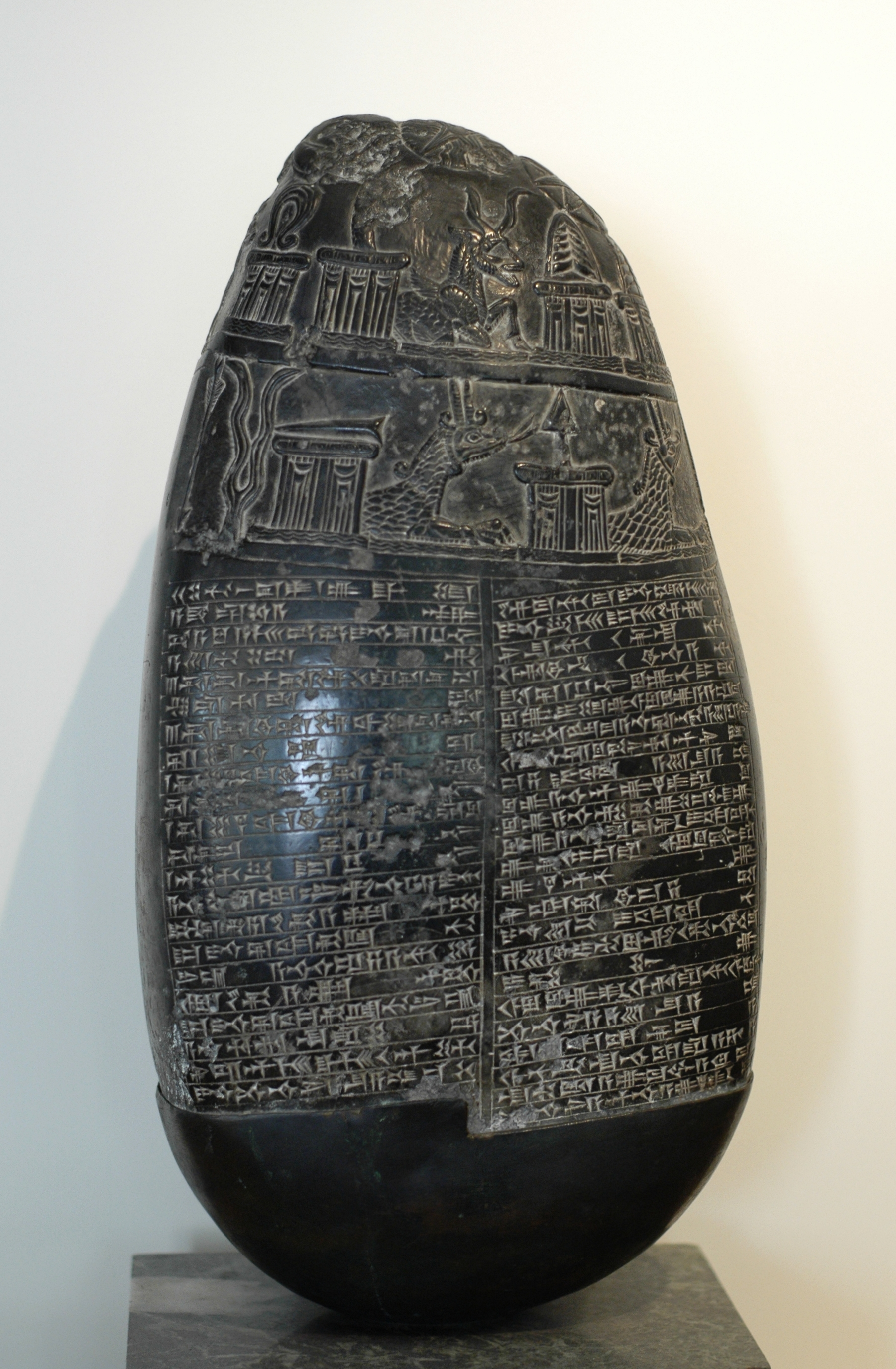
Babylonian kudurru of the late Kassite period found near Baghdad by the French botanist André Michaux (Cabinet des Médailles, Paris)

A kudurru was a type of stone document used as a boundary stone and as a record of land grants to vassals by the Kassites and later dynasties in ancient Babylonia between the 16th and 7th centuries BC. The original kudurru would typically be stored in a temple while the person granted the land would be given a clay copy to use to confirm legal ownership. Kudurrus are often linked to what are usually called "ancient kudurrus", land grant stones from the third millennium (typically Sargonic and Ur III) which serve a similar purpose though the word kudurru did not emerge until the 2nd millennium (Middle Babylonian in fact).

== Background ==
The objects are traditionally called kudurru which is Akkadian for "frontier" or "boundary". because early epigraphers frequently found that word in the text and assumed they were placed in agricultural setting, not the temples they actually were. While there is consensus on the main group of kudurru there are other "debatable kudurru" for which opinion is divided, such as those on clay nails. Kudurru typically referred to themselves as narû which is Akkadian for stone or stele (occasionally as kudurru, asumittu, or abnu). About one third of the 160 known kudurru were found in temples at Susa where they were taken when the Elamites conquered Mesopotamia. Half of those excavated in Babylonia were also found in temples. They range in height from 10 cm (3.9 in) to 1 m (3 ft 3 in) and the inscriptions on them ranged from 39 to 390 lines. Examples are in the Louvre, the British Museum, and the National Museum of Iraq. One kudurru, of Marduk-nadin-ahhe (1095–1078 BC) of the Second Dynasty of Isin is found in the Warwick Museum. Another kudduru of that ruler, long and essentially complete, was found near Ctesiphon and is held in the Baghdad Museum. They are examples of how kudurru usage continued for several centuries after the end of the Kassite Dynasty. The last known kudurru was of the Babylonian ruler Ashur-nadin-shumi (700–694 BC).

== Content ==
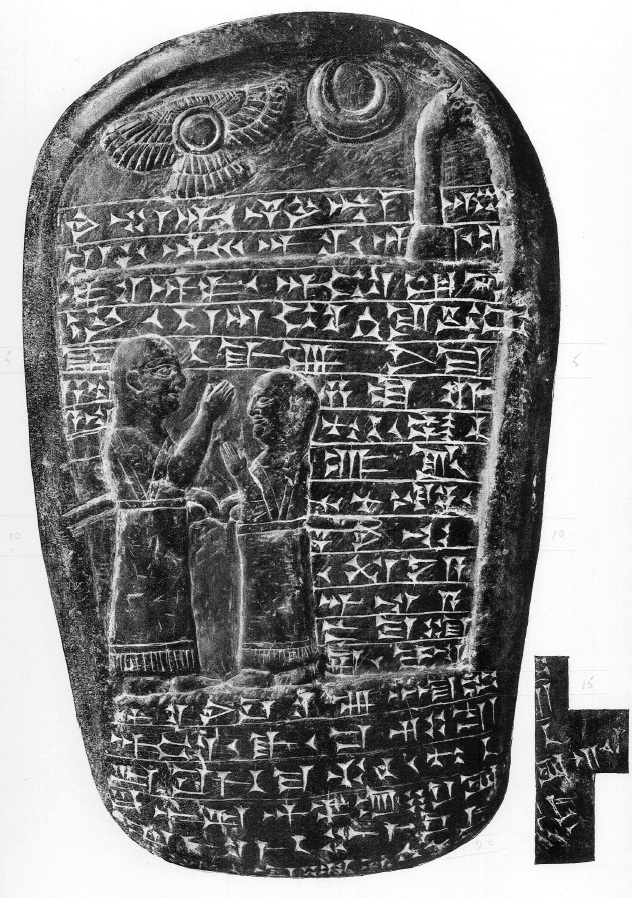
BM 90834

While most kudurru record land grants some serve other purposes. Two kudurrus of Nebuchadnezzar I (1121–1100 BC) record his victory over the Elamites and his recovery of the cult statue of Marduk, the city god of Babylon, captured years earlier. Another example, from the reign of Nabu-apla-iddina (886–853 BC) commemorates the recovery of the Sippar city-god Shamash, lost circa 1100 BC when the Suteans overran several cult centers in Babylonia. This replaced a sun disk erected by the ruler Simbar-shipak (1021–1004 BC) as a stand in. Other kudurru record legal cases, usually when loss of life is involved, making it the domain of the ruler. Finally, some kudurru record gifts of prebends (income from land for temples or priests) or royal relief from taxes or labor for individuals.

Kudurru have a standard format with some features being optional. They contain:

- A description of the kudurru's intent, granting land, etc. There may be a relief illustrating this, showing the king, the grantee, or the defendant as appropriate.
- A call upon the gods to recognize and endorse the kudurru and to curse anyone who violates the intent or damages the stone. There may be symbols of the relevant gods on the stele to strengthen this call. These symbols have been the cause of much speculation over the years, some of it chronological.

== Examples of kudurrus ==
- Enlil-bānī land grant kudurru
- Nazimaruttaš kudurru stone
- Kudurru of Kaštiliašu
- Land grant to Ḫunnubat-Nanaya kudurru
- Land grant to Marduk-apla-iddina I by Meli-Shipak II
- Estate of Takil-ana-ilīšu kudurru
- Land grant to Ḫasardu kudurru
- Land grant to Marduk-zākir-šumi kudurru
- Land grant to Munnabittu kudurru
- Kudurru of Gula
- Kudurru for Šitti-Marduk
- Eanna-shum-iddina kudurru
- Marduk-nadin-ahhe kudurru
- Marduk-zakir-šumi I kudurru
- Marduk-apal-iddina II kudurru

== See also ==
- Sun God Tablet
- Tablet of Shamash
- Stele of Meli-Šipak
- Kurgan stelae
- Runestone
