= Register (art) =

Part of a visual design

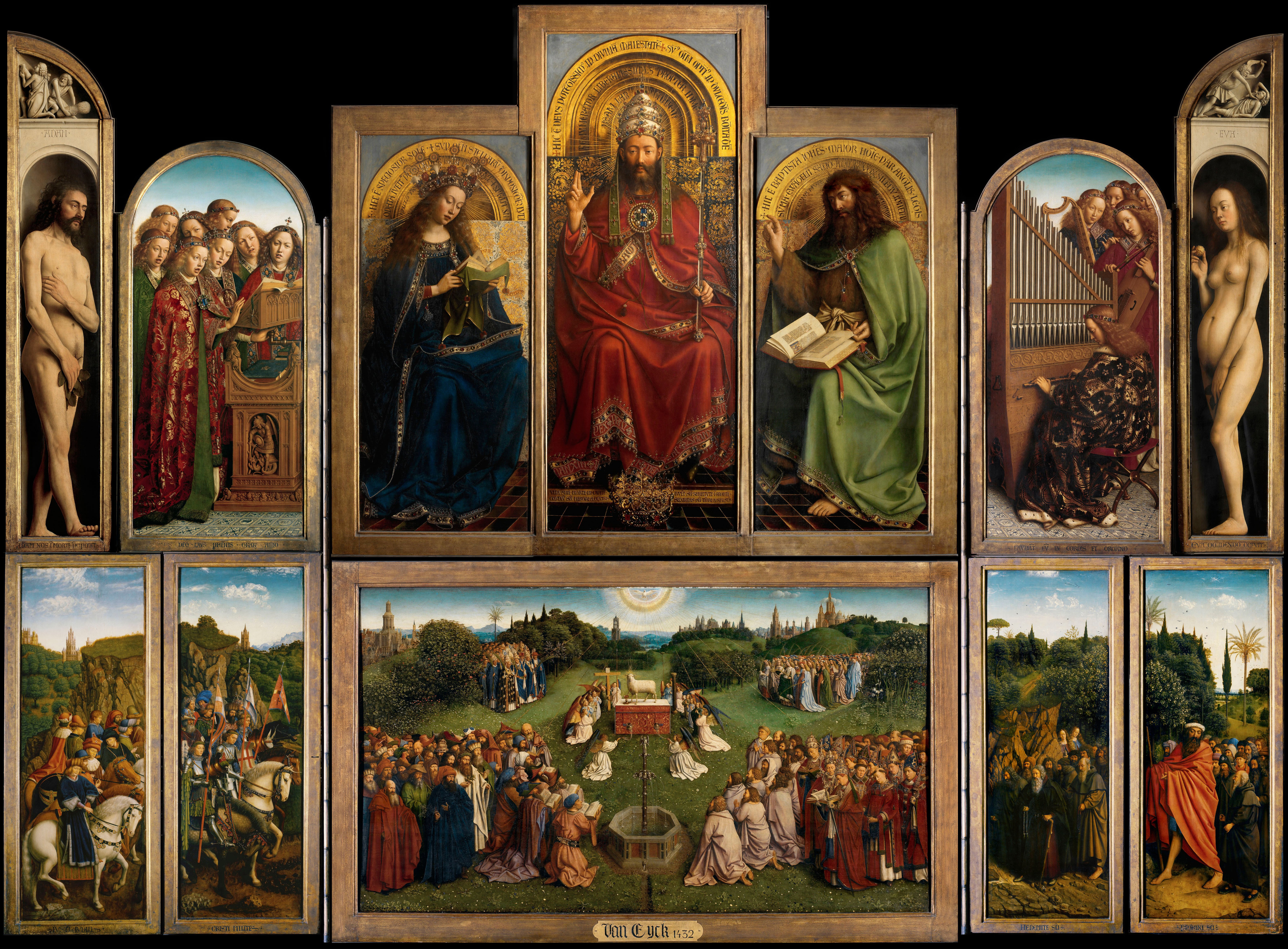
The Ghent Altarpiece, an early 15th century polyptych panel painting

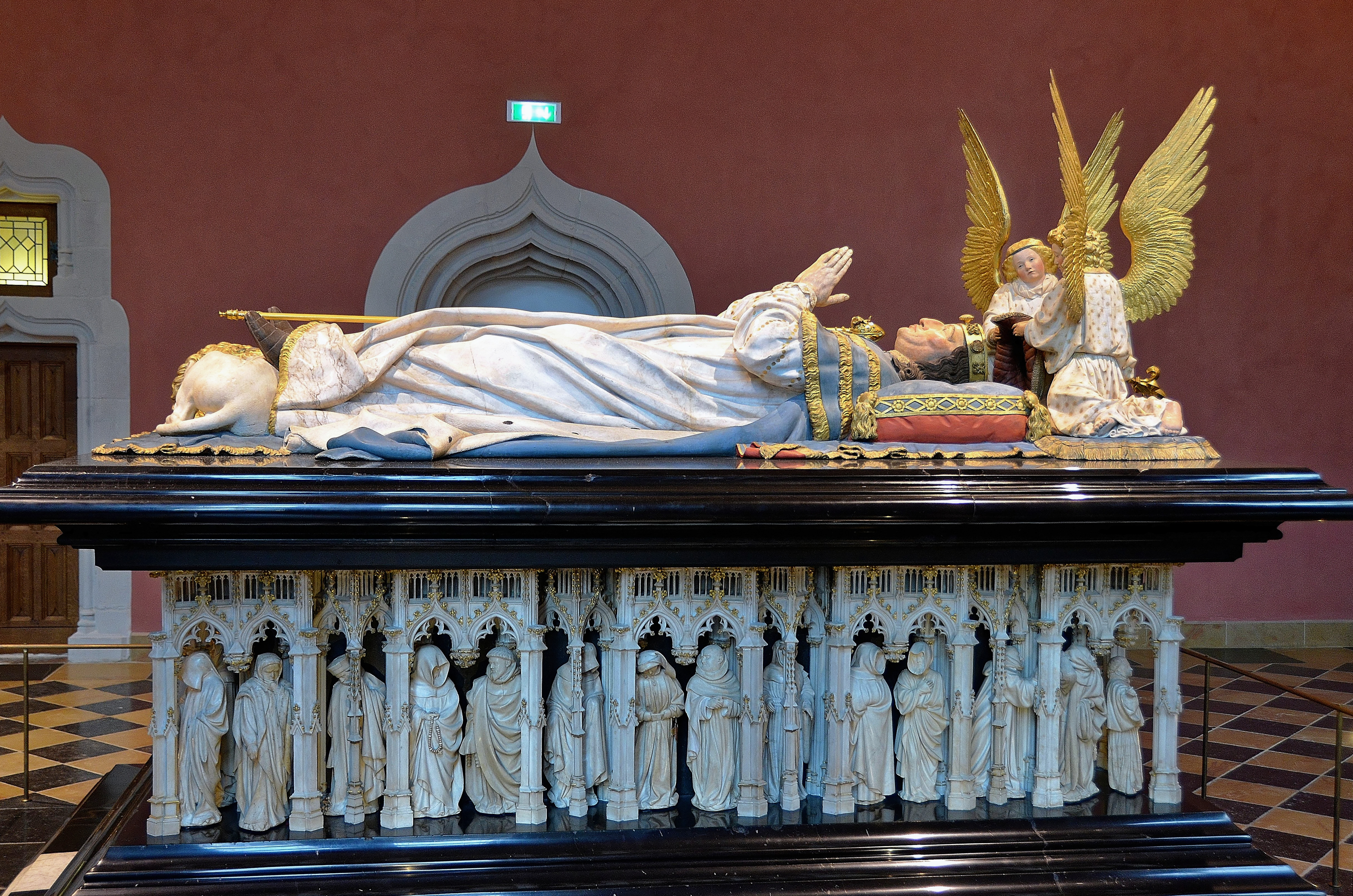
Tomb of Philip the Bold, built between 1384 and 1410

In art and archaeology, sculpture and painting, a register is a horizontal level in a work that consists of several levels arranged one above the other, especially where the levels are clearly separated by lines. Modern comic books typically use similar conventions. It is thus comparable to a row, or a line in modern texts. In the study of ancient writing, such as cuneiform and Egyptian hieroglyphs, "register" may be used of vertical compartments like columns containing writing that are arranged side by side and separated by lines, especially in cylinder seals, which often mix text and images. Normally, when dealing with images it only refers to row compartments stacked vertically.

The use of registers is common in Ancient Egyptian art, from the Narmer Palette onwards, and in medieval art in large frescos and illuminated manuscripts. Narrative art, especially covering the lives of sacred figures, is often presented as a sequence of small scenes arranged in registers.

Sculpted Luwian language hieroglyphs were also usually arranged in registers one above the other. The direction of reading ran from one of the top corners, and reversed direction in each lower register, so that the reader did not have to start at the other end of each new row. Other examples, in the art of Mesopotamia, are Kudurru, or boundary stones, which often had registers of gods on the upper register of the scenes.

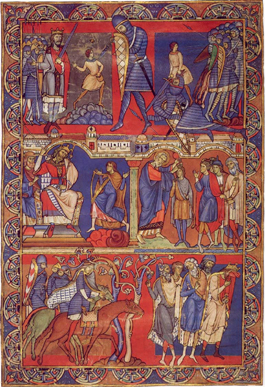
Scenes from the life of David over three registers. The "Morgan Leaf", detached from the illuminated manuscript Winchester Bible of 1160−75.

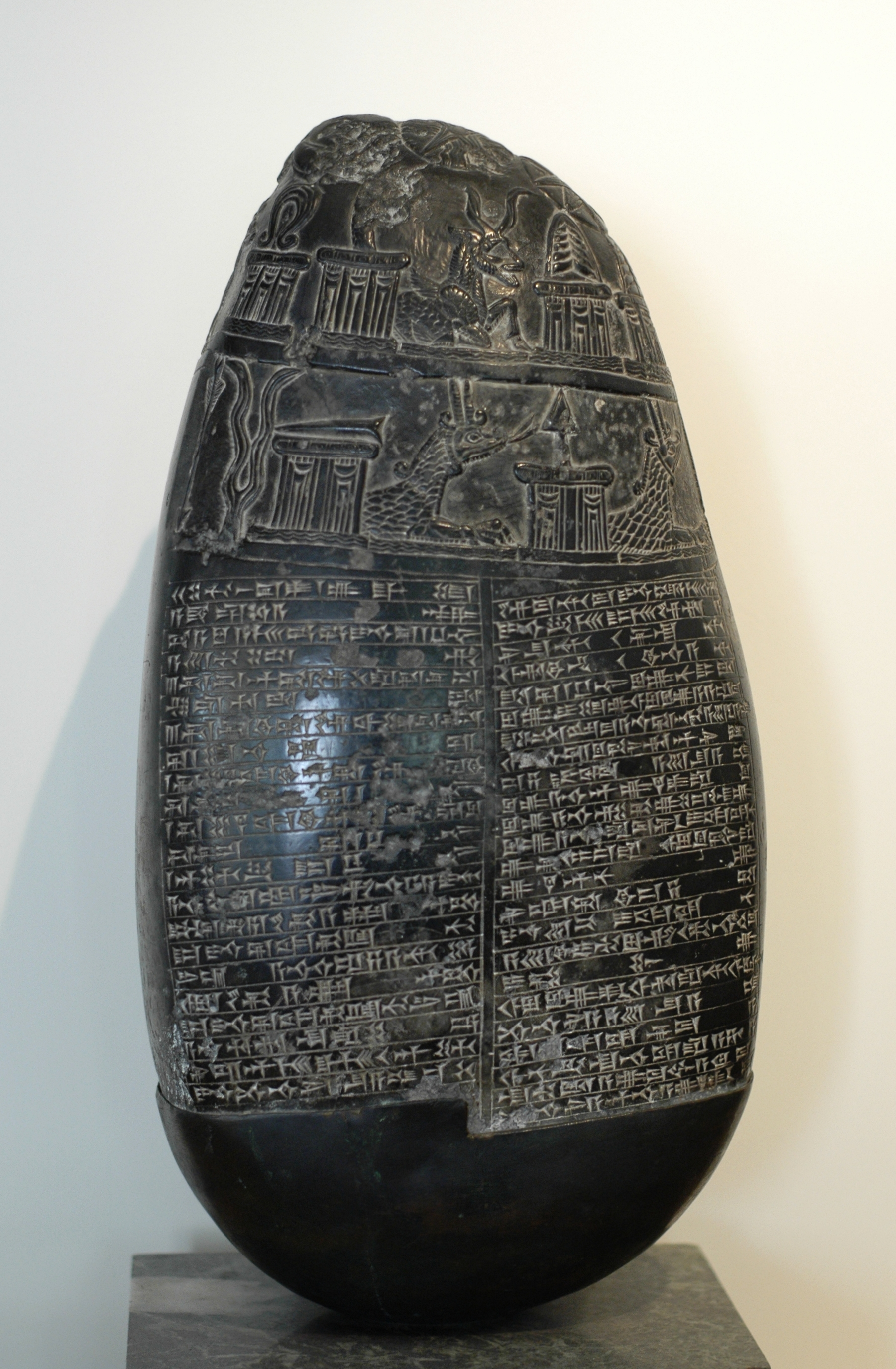
Babylonian kudurru of the late Kassite period found near Baghdad. The upper images are in two registers.
