= Luristan bronze =

Iron Age sculptures found in Iran

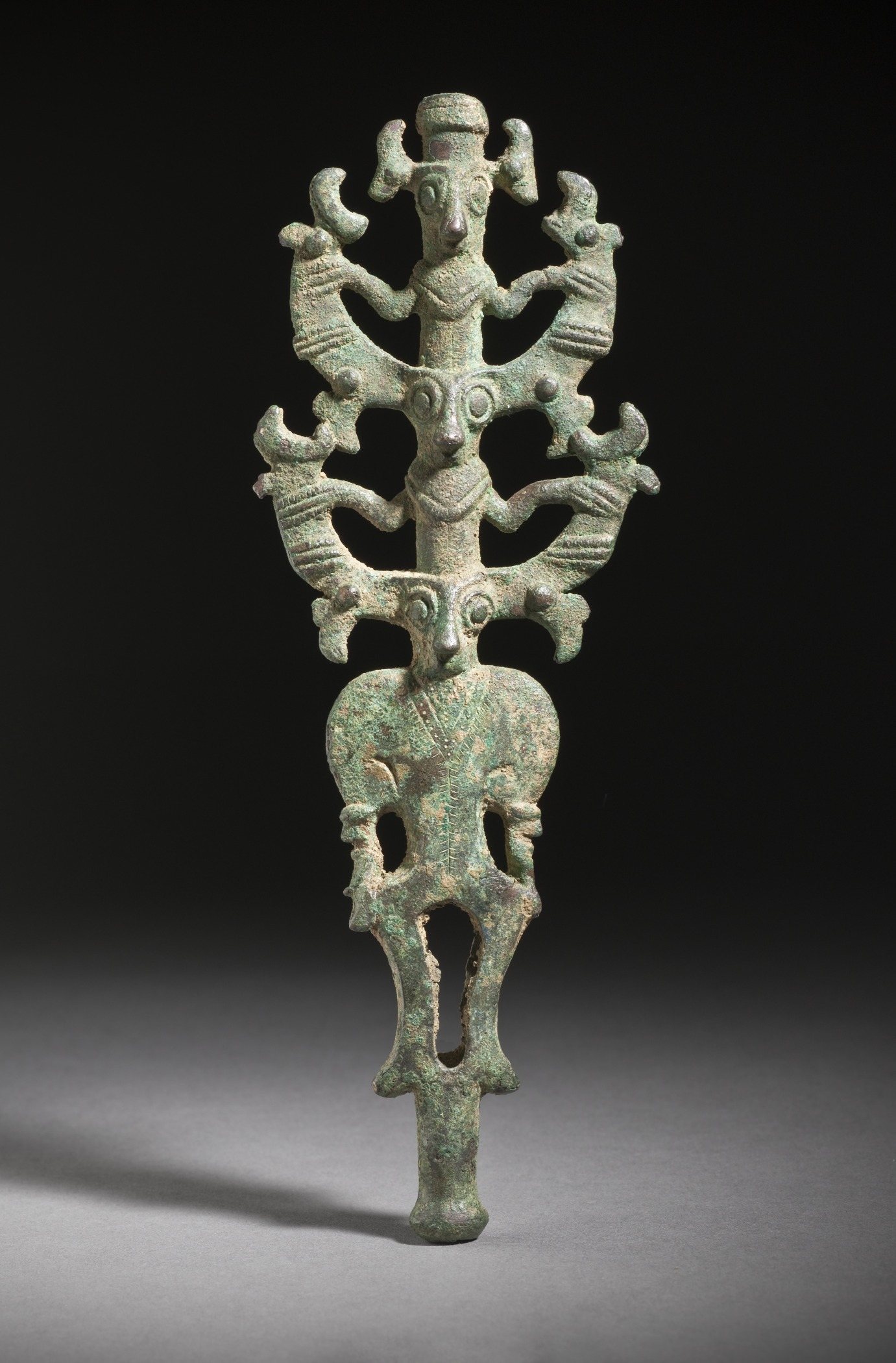
One of the distinctive "canonical" types of Luristan bronze, the "Master of Animals standard", here on two levels, showing "zoomorphic juncture"; 8.5 inches high.

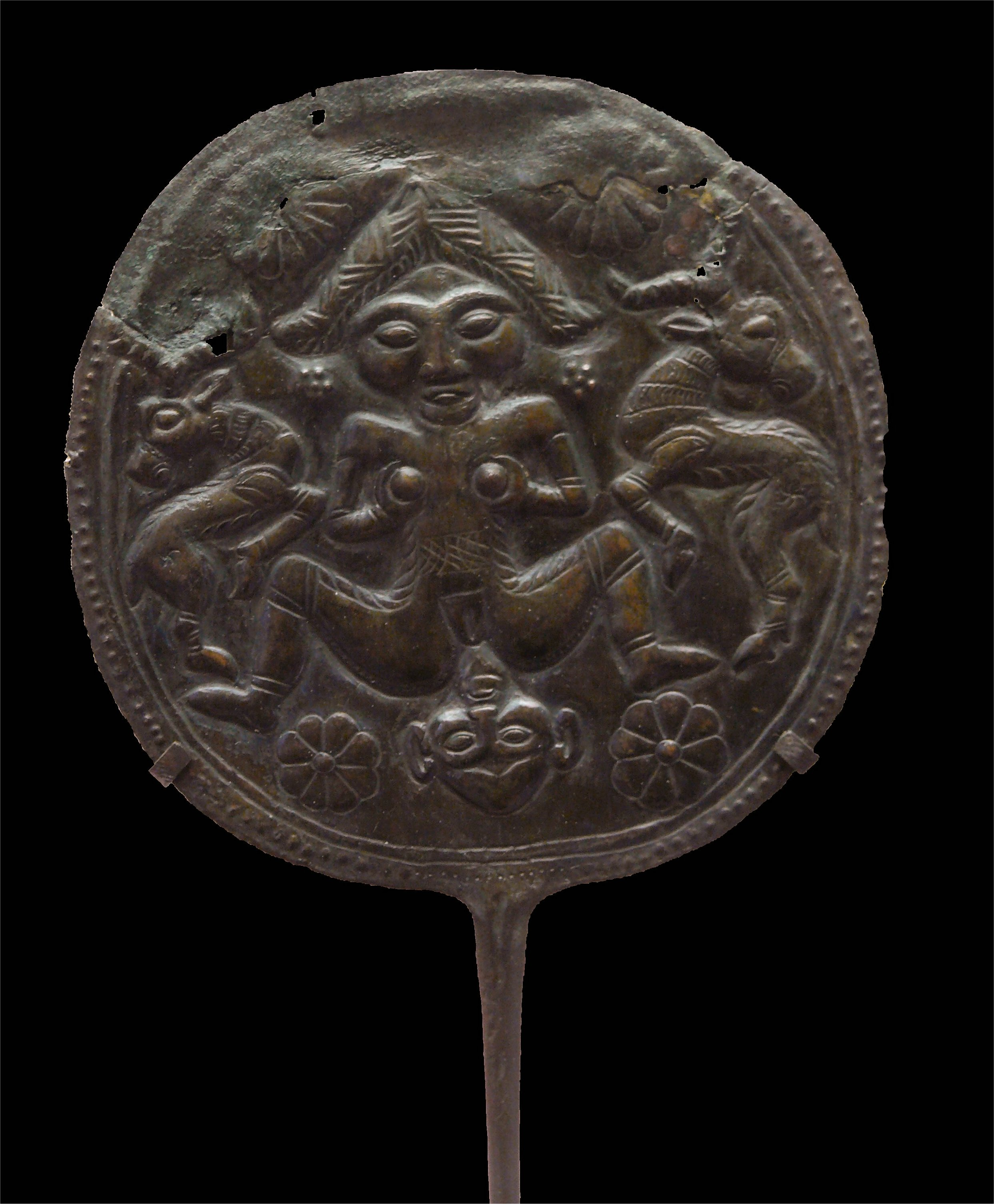
Fibula showing a woman giving birth flanked by two antelopes, ornamented with flowers, 1000 to 650 BC, Louvre museum.

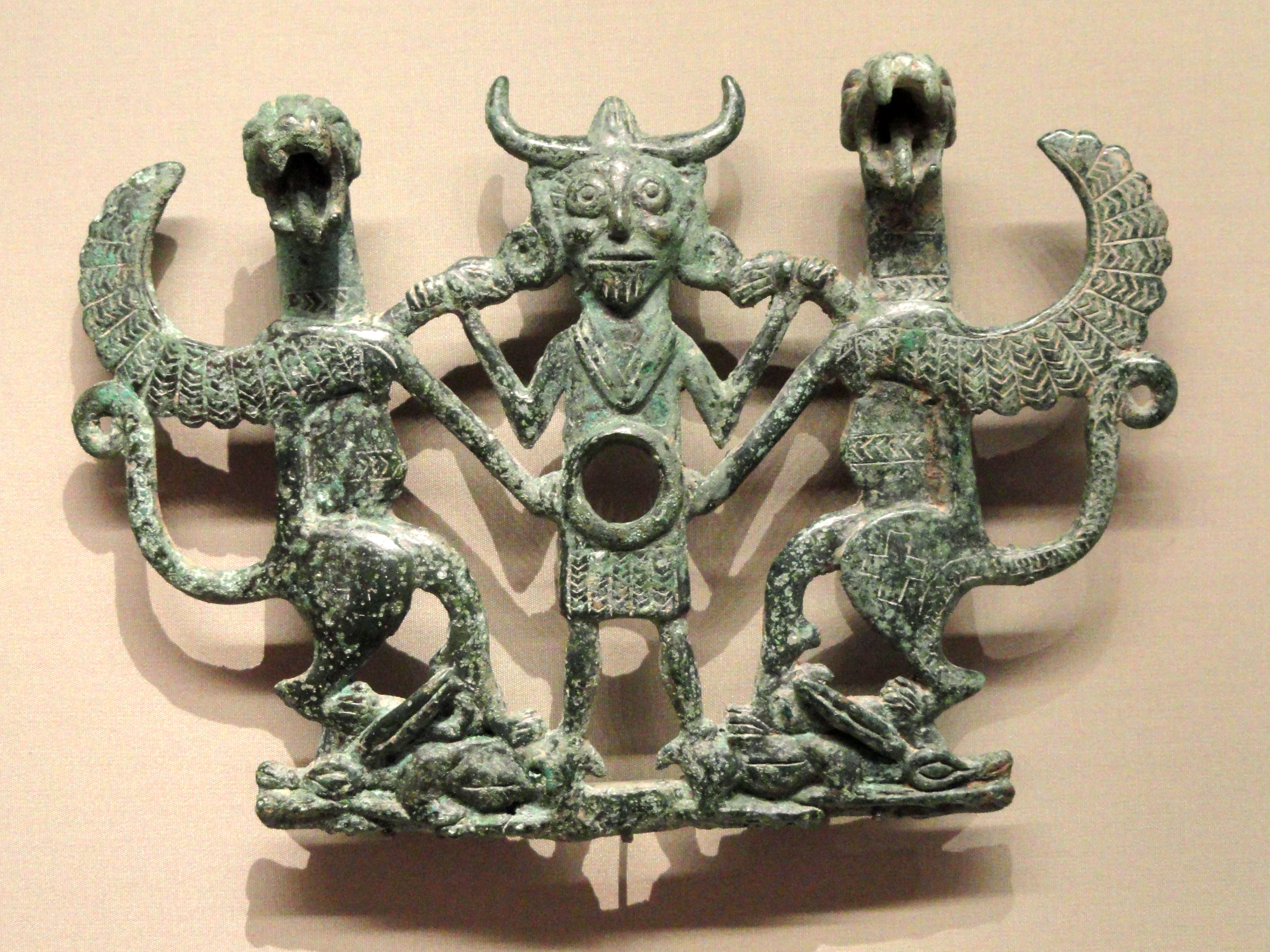
Horse bit cheekpiece with "Master of Animals" motif, about 700 BC

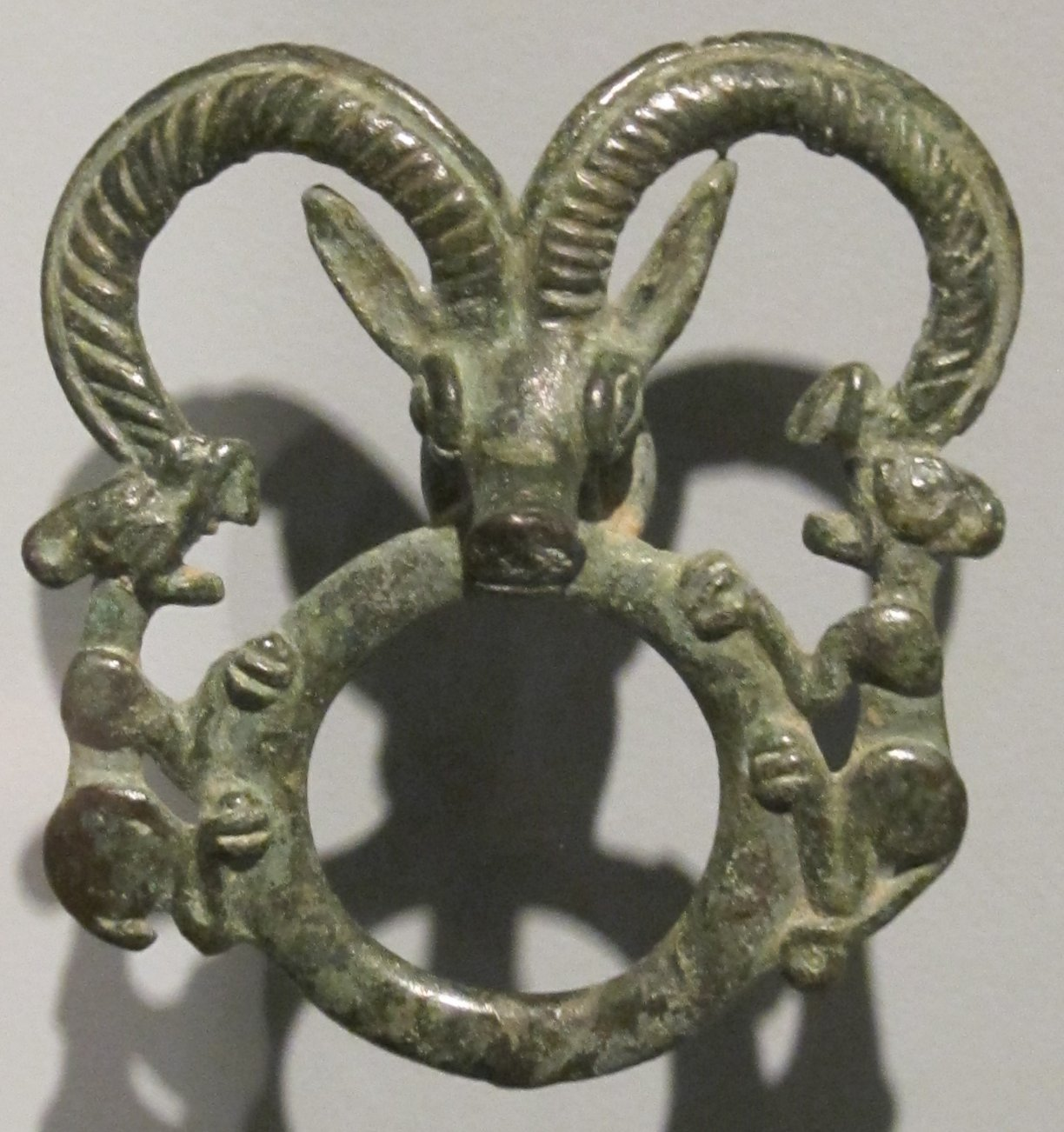
Harness ring with ibex and felines

Luristan bronzes (rarely "Lorestān", "Lorestāni" etc. in sources in English) are small cast objects decorated with bronze sculpture from the Early Iron Age which have been found in large numbers in Lorestān Province and Kermanshah in western Iran. They include a great number of ornaments, tools, weapons, horse-fittings and a smaller number of vessels including situlae, and those found in recorded excavations are generally found in burials. The ethnicity of the people who created them remains unclear, though they may well have been Iranian, possibly related to the modern Lur people who have given their name to the area. They probably date to between about 1000 and 650 BC.

The bronzes tend to be flat and use openwork, like the related metalwork of Scythian art. They represent the art of a nomadic or transhumant people, for whom all possessions needed to be light and portable, and necessary objects such as weapons, finials (perhaps for tent-poles), horse-harness fittings, pins, cups and small fittings are highly decorated over their small surface area. Representations of animals are common, especially goats or sheep with large horns, and the forms and styles are distinctive and inventive. The "Master of Animals" motif, showing a human positioned between and grasping two confronted animals is common but typically highly stylized. Some female "mistress of animals" are seen.

== Discovery ==
Luristan bronze objects came to the notice of the world art market from the late 1920s and were excavated in considerable quantities by local people, "wild tribesmen who did not encourage the competition of qualified excavators", and taken through networks of dealers, latterly illegally, to Europe or America, without information about the contexts in which they were found. Previous sporadic examples reaching the West had been assigned to various places, including Armenia and Anatolia. There is strong suspicion that the many thousands of pieces sourced from the art trade include some forgeries.

Since 1938 several scientific excavations have been conducted by American, Danish, British, Belgian and Iranian archaeologists on the cemeteries in areas including the northern Pish Kuh valleys and the southern Pusht Kuh of Lorestān; these are terms for the eastern "front" and western "back" slopes of the Kabīrkūh range of mountains, part of the larger Zagros Mountains, which define the region where the bronzes seem to have been found. How these cemeteries related to contemporary settlements remains unclear.

Two characteristic Luristan pieces have been excavated in the Greek world, on Samos and Crete, but none in other parts of Iran or West Asia.

== Context, dating and stylistic development ==
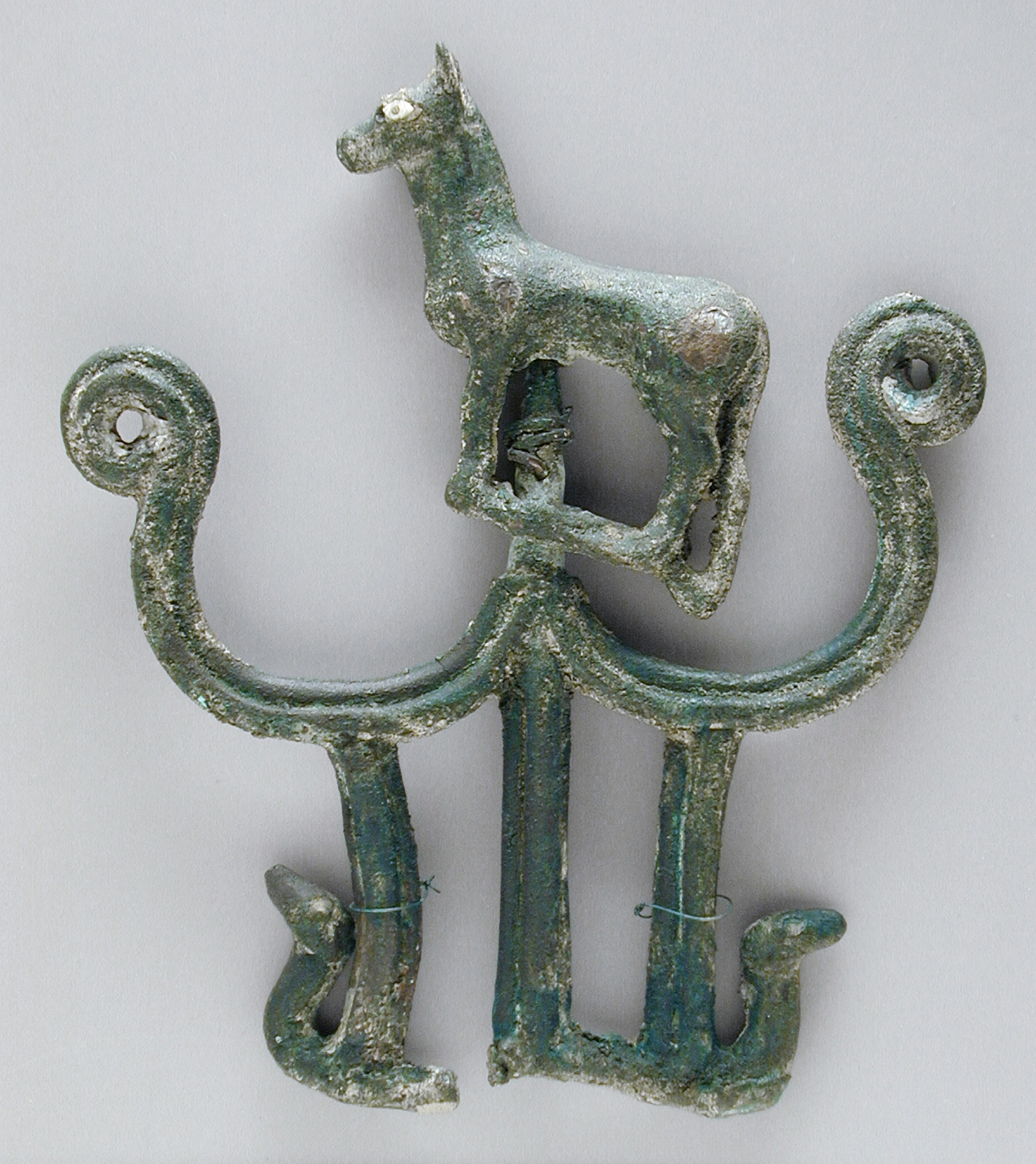
A predecessor: early Elamite horse trapping in cast bronze, c. 2600–2400 BC

The term "Luristan bronze" is not normally used for earlier bronze artifacts from Lorestān between the fourth millennium BC and the (Iranian) Bronze Age (c. 2900–1250 BC), although they are often quite similar. These earlier bronze objects, including those from the Elamite Empire, which included Lorestān, were broadly similar to those found in Mesopotamia and on the Iranian Plateau, though as in the later pieces, animals are a very common subject in small bronze pieces. From slightly before the period of the canonical bronzes, a number of daggers or short swords said to come from Luristan are inscribed with the names of Mesopotamian kings, perhaps reflecting patterns of military service.

For most of the period of the bronzes it was, at least in theory, part of the Neo-Assyrian Empire. As a mountainous rural region, what the rise and fall of these empires meant for the region remains largely uncertain; a climate change before 1000 BC seems to have significantly affected the area. The few pieces attributed to Luristan that carry inscriptions are unrecorded pieces from the antiquities market.

Archaeologists divide the periods producing the bronzes into "Luristan Late Iron" (Age) I to III. Luristan Late Iron II was less productive, and remains less well understood. Dates for these periods "remain fluid" but "it is possible to suggest that the material from Luristan Iron I was manufactured in the years around 1000 B.C., that of Iron II about 900/800–750, and that of Iron III about 750/725–650."

The stylistic development of the pieces is now thought to be from naturalistic depictions of humans and animals towards stylization, though it is not yet clear if this was a consistent trend. This reverses the trend proposed by Michael Rostovtzeff, one of the earliest writers on the bronzes.

== Types of objects ==
Though there is a wide range of objects, certain types are especially common, distinctive, and hence "canonical".

=== Animal finials, standards and tubes ===
Among the most characteristic are a range of objects with a hollow socket or open ring, designed to be fixed at the top of a pole or other vertical support, often using a separate intervening fitting. These may be described as finials, standards and tubes; Muscarella and other writers use all these terms, differentiating between them on the basis of the form of their decoration alone. Unlike some other types of objects, very few of this group have been found by the archaeological explorations. They may also have been used with perishable elements that have not survived, either as additional decoration or to hold the ensemble together. Many ideas for their function have been suggested, without any general consensus being reached; one persistent suggestion is that leafy or flowering branches were inserted to top them. The numbers surviving suggest that the objects were not rare, and may have been affordable by most families.

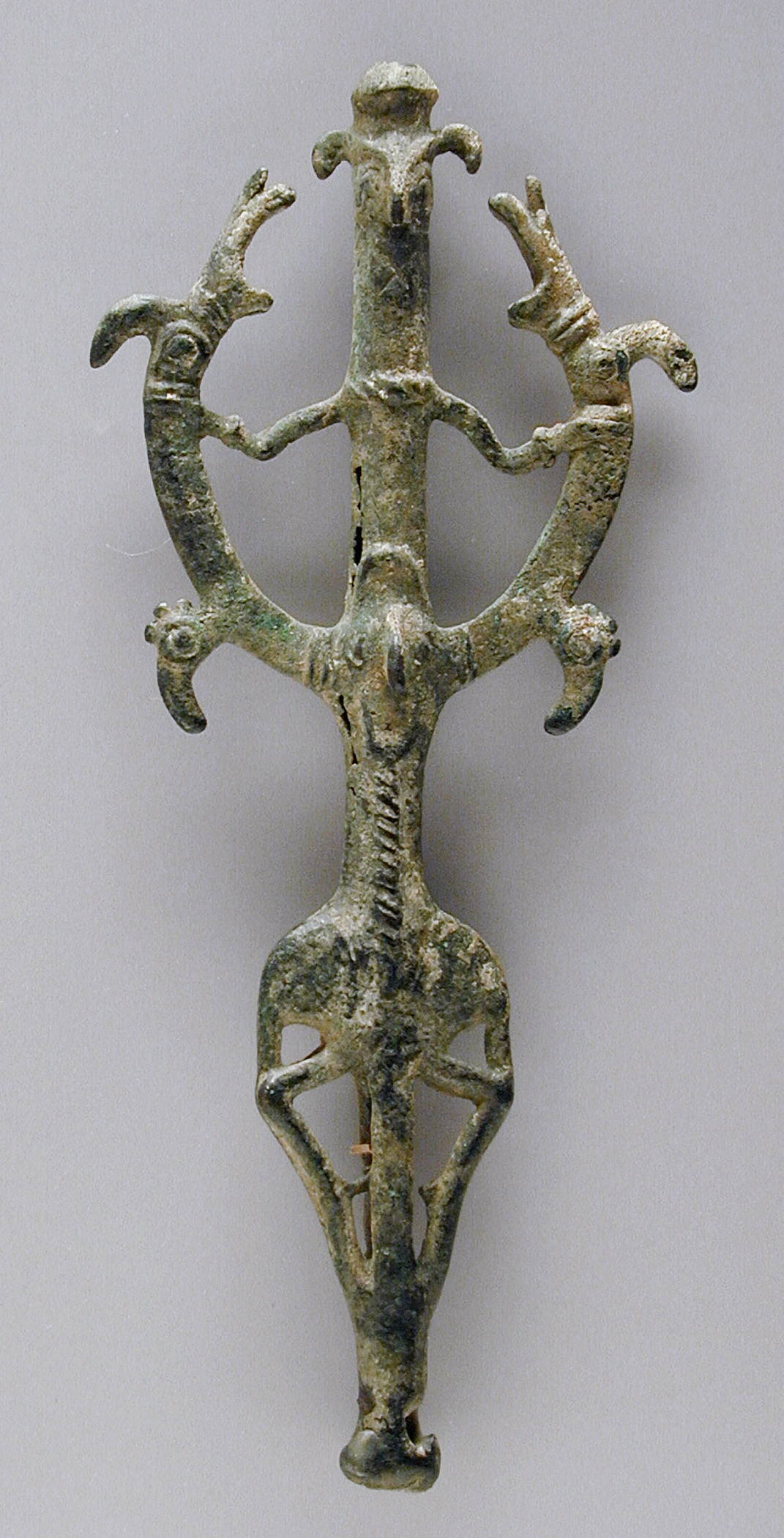
Master of Animals standard

Taking the groups in what is now generally considered to be their broad chronological sequence, the first are the "animal finials", with two rampant confronted animals, generally a pair of large-horned ibex (or goats or mouflon sheep) or felines, facing each other with a central tube or open rings (formed at the junctions of their front and hind feet) between them. The bezoar ibex (capra aegagrus aegagrusis), the local wild species of goat or ibex, was already domesticated millennia before; it has large curved horns with knobbly ribs. Compared to later types, the animals are more naturalistic, especially the ibex group, though not so much that their precise species can be very confidently determined. In some examples the figures are "demons", with human features except for their large horns.

The next group is a less common type, often called the "idol standard". Here the feline "animal finial" type has in addition a detached human head in between the two heads of the animals, held by their front paws. The designs have become openwork, with enclosed spaces formed by the human head and the head and neck of each feline, and others by their hind legs. The meaning, if any, of this group is unclear, but they seem if anything to reverse the meaning of the next, much more common group, called the "master of animals standards".

These have a fuller figure, now seen down to the waist with an essentially human shape (including what may be divine and "demonic" figures) in between the two animals, grasping them to form the Master of Animals motif, already over 2000 years old at this point, and a mainstay of iconography in the art of Mesopotamia. Now the arms of the human usually extend to grasp the necks of the animals. All the figures are highly stylized, and often the whole composition is repeated underneath, facing in the opposite direction. The bodies of all three figures tend to merge at the middle into the central tube, before diverging again at the lower limbs. The "zoomorphic juncture", where the body of one animal turns into another, is very often seen, with a further human head and pair of animal heads appearing at the waist level of the top set of figures. This second human head often also has a body, and two further animal heads, these typically of cocks, project from it lower down.

In the final group, called the "anthromorphic tubes", this lower figure with projecting cock's heads is all that is left, or just the human figure, of which only the head may be at all recognisable. Thus the simplest types are just a tube with a human face near the top, sometimes a Janus face with two heads back to back, and perhaps some simple mouldings on the tube. Whether these groups actually represent a chronological development with one type succeeding another is unclear. Other tubes are comparable, but use animal rather than human features.

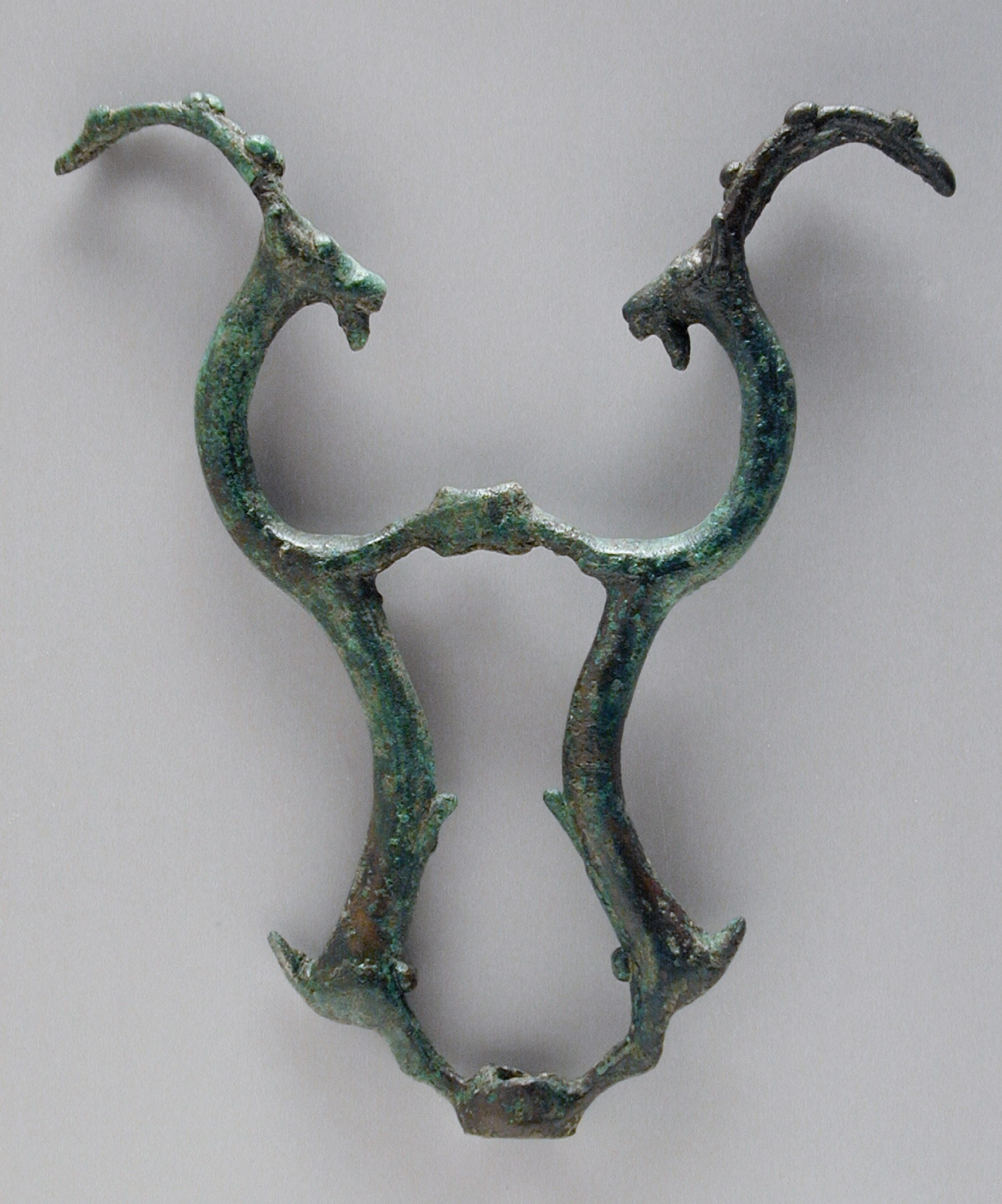
Ibex animal finial with rings

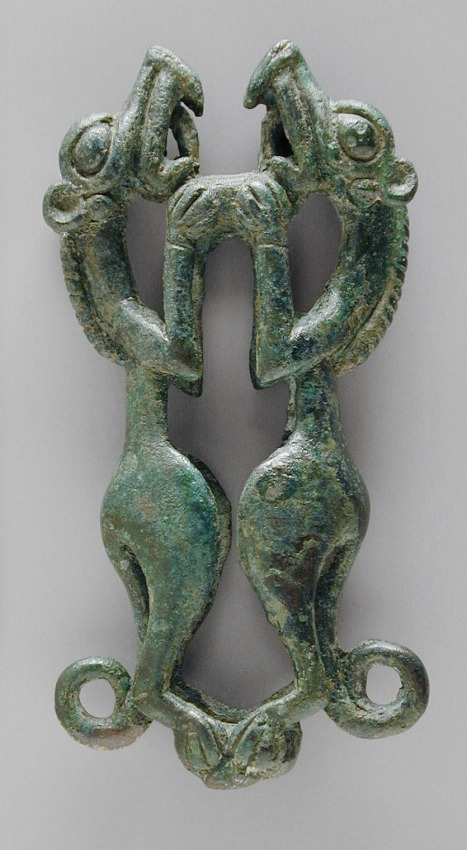
Feline animal finial with rings

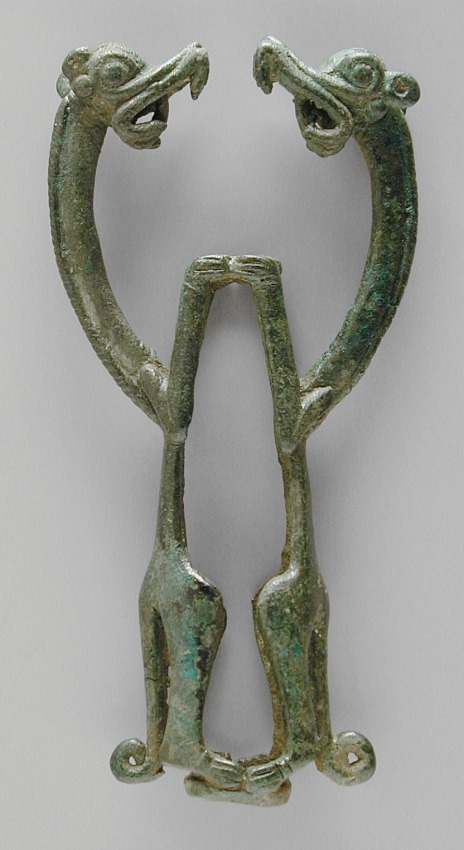
Feline animal finial with rings

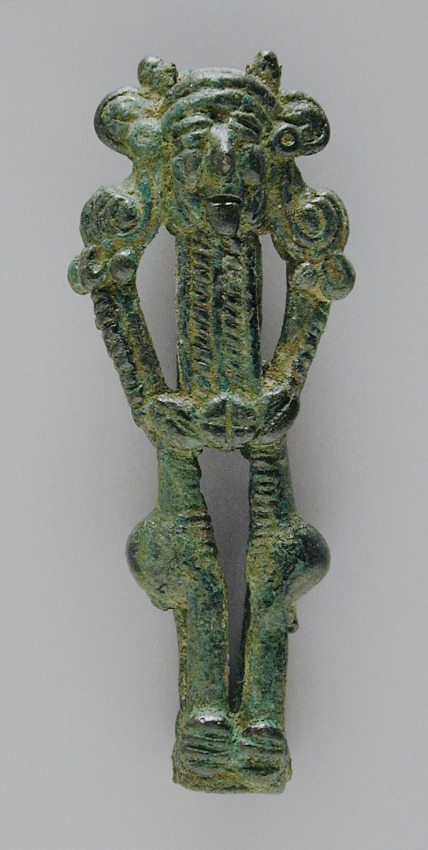
"Idol standard" type

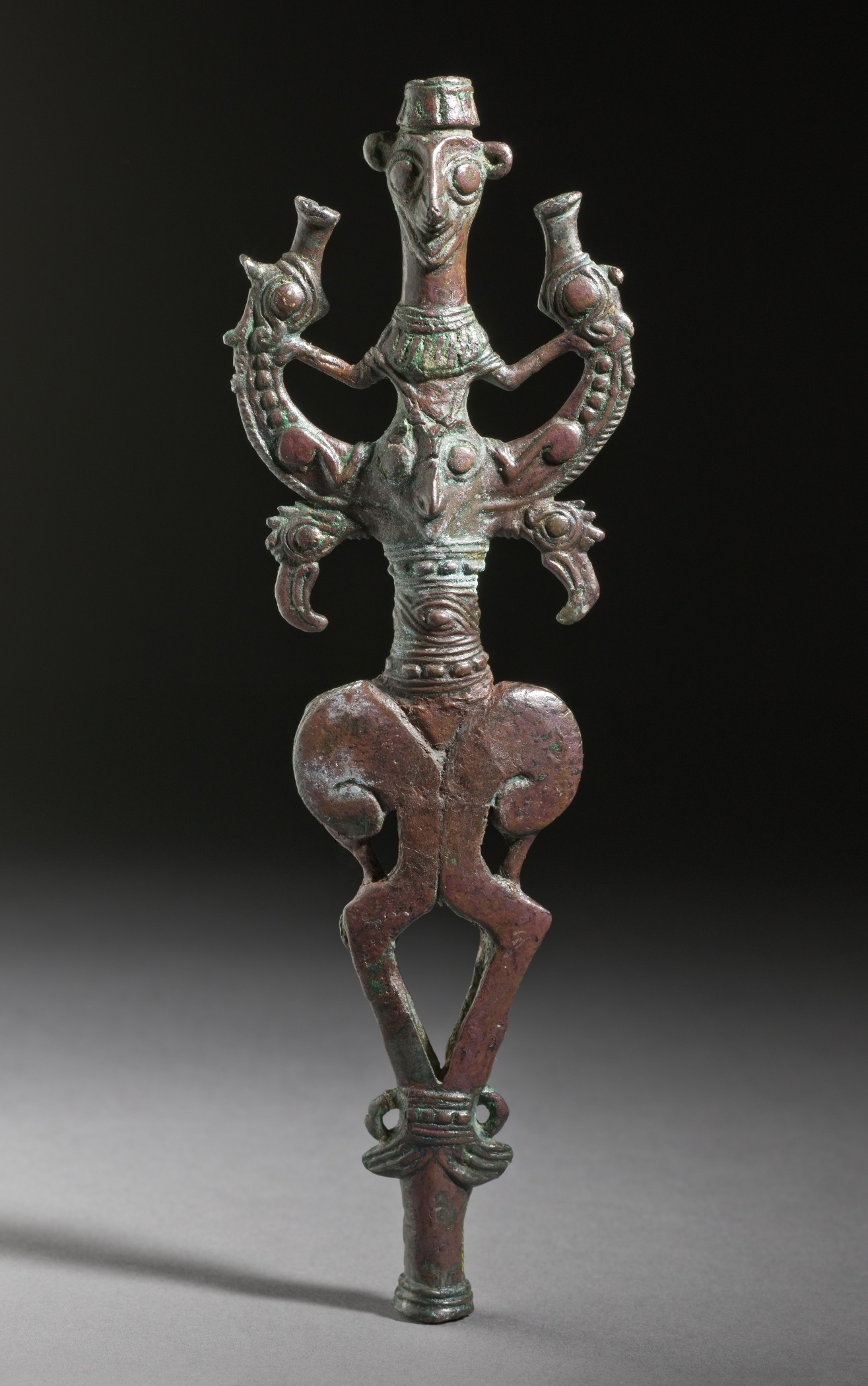
Master of Animals standard

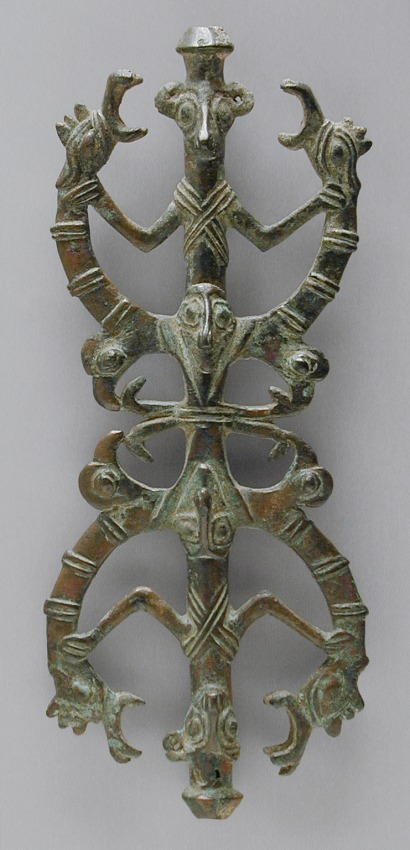
Master of Animals standard, double composition

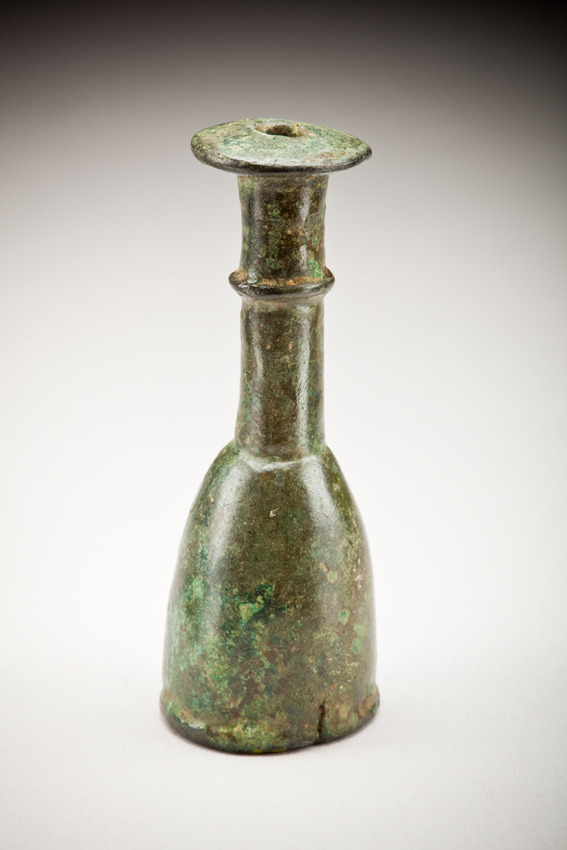
Support piece

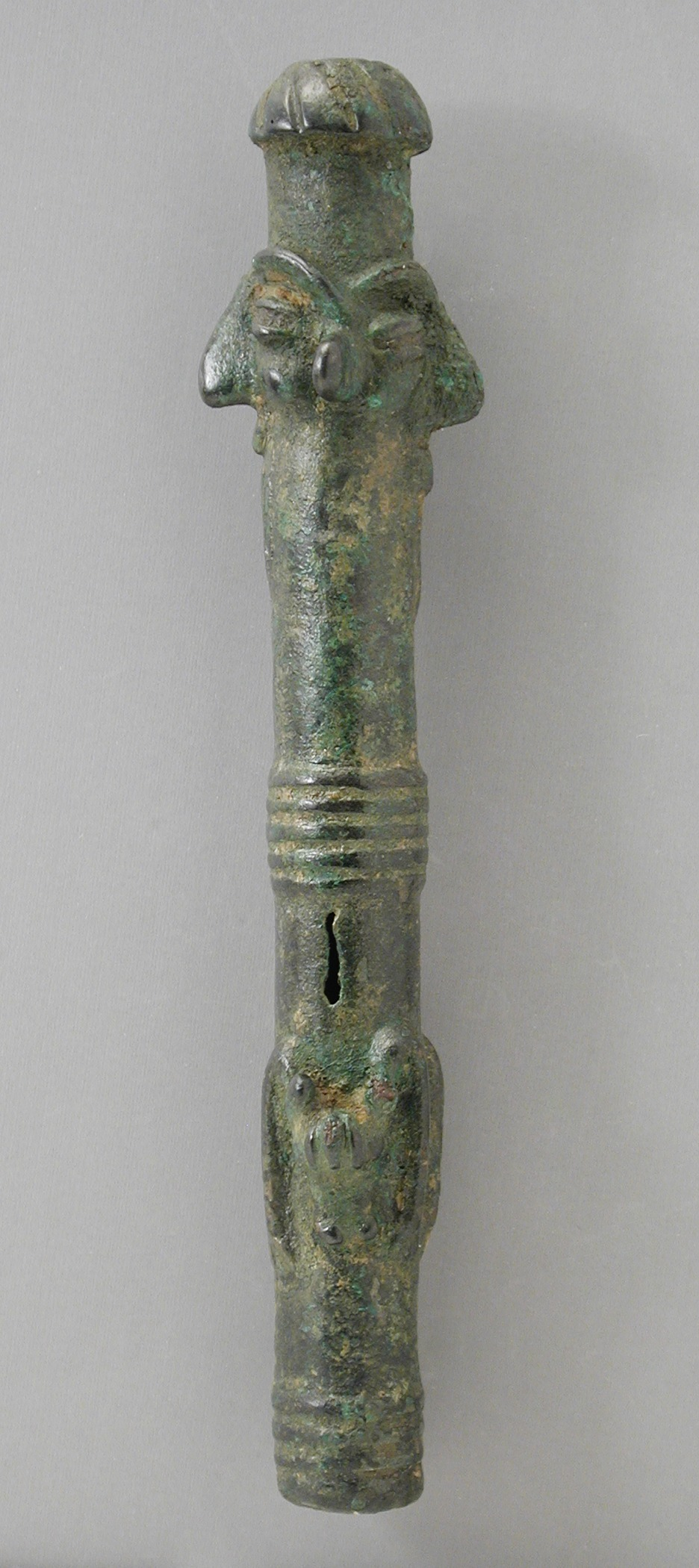
"Anthromorphic tube"

=== Horse cheekpieces ===
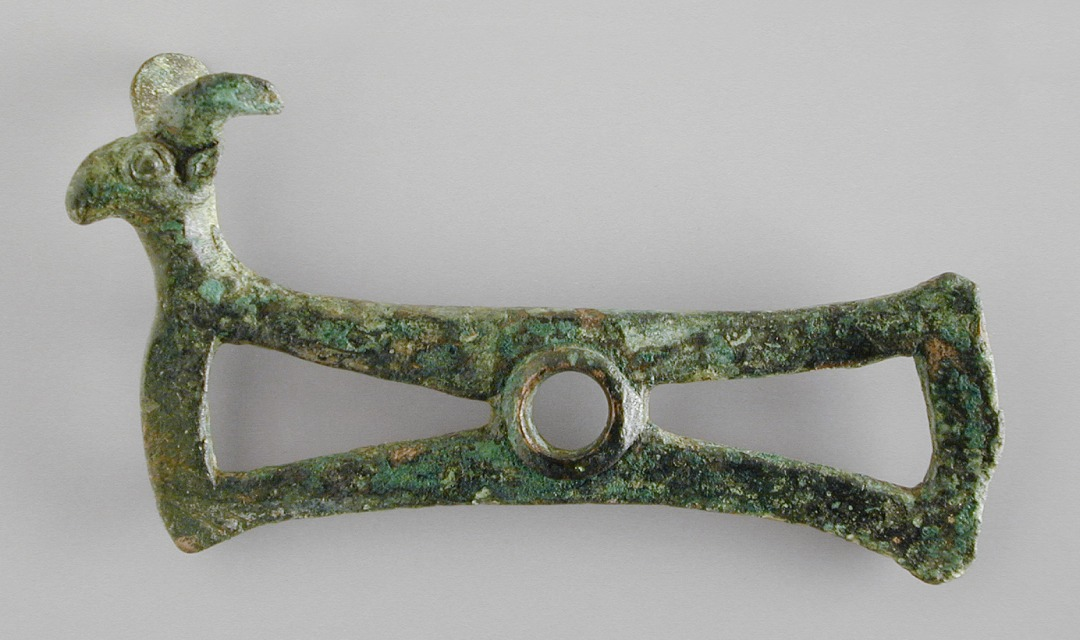
Some horse cheekpieces have the animal "body" reduced to a rectangle.

Another common class of bronzes is pairs of horse cheekpieces from bits; when complete these come with a bar between them that goes in the horse's mouth. There are often rings in the upper or rear parts of the plates, for securing straps to tie round the horse's head. These are flat openwork plates, with a reinforced central hole for the bit mouthpiece to go through; where complete sets survive these are held in place by the ends of the mouthpiece bar being curled back.

Designs are varied, but most common are animals, very often in fantastic versions with wings, and the Master of Animals. Other subjects include charioteers, and a subject with two figures flanking a tree-like object. Many examples survive as single plates, perhaps separated after they were dug up. The common story that the pieces were often found placed underneath the heads of men in burials seems not to be true. Most pieces were found in unrecorded contexts, but one example of a Luristan horse burial is known; it is unclear if it was from the same period.

Though horse riding was very common among Near Eastern elites by this date, who all used some type of bit, this large style of cheekpiece is only found in Luristan. The rigid single-piece mouthpiece bar, secured by bent back ends, is also unusual; elsewhere more flexible mouthpieces are found. Many pieces have small spikes on the reverse of the plates; it is thought these were either used to control the horse, or to fix backing pads of softer material.

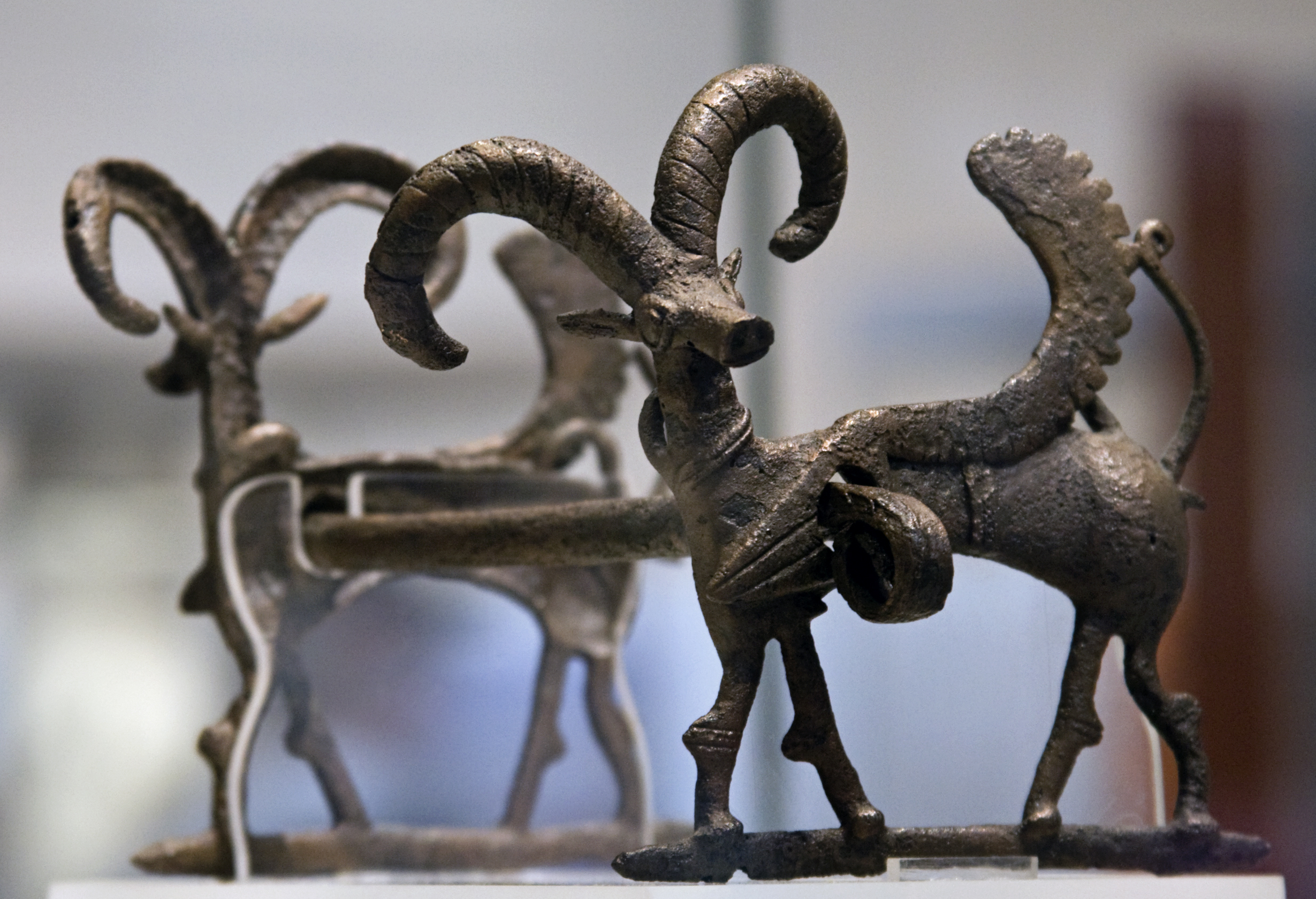
Pair of cheekpieces with intact bit; the loops at the ends of the torso can be seen

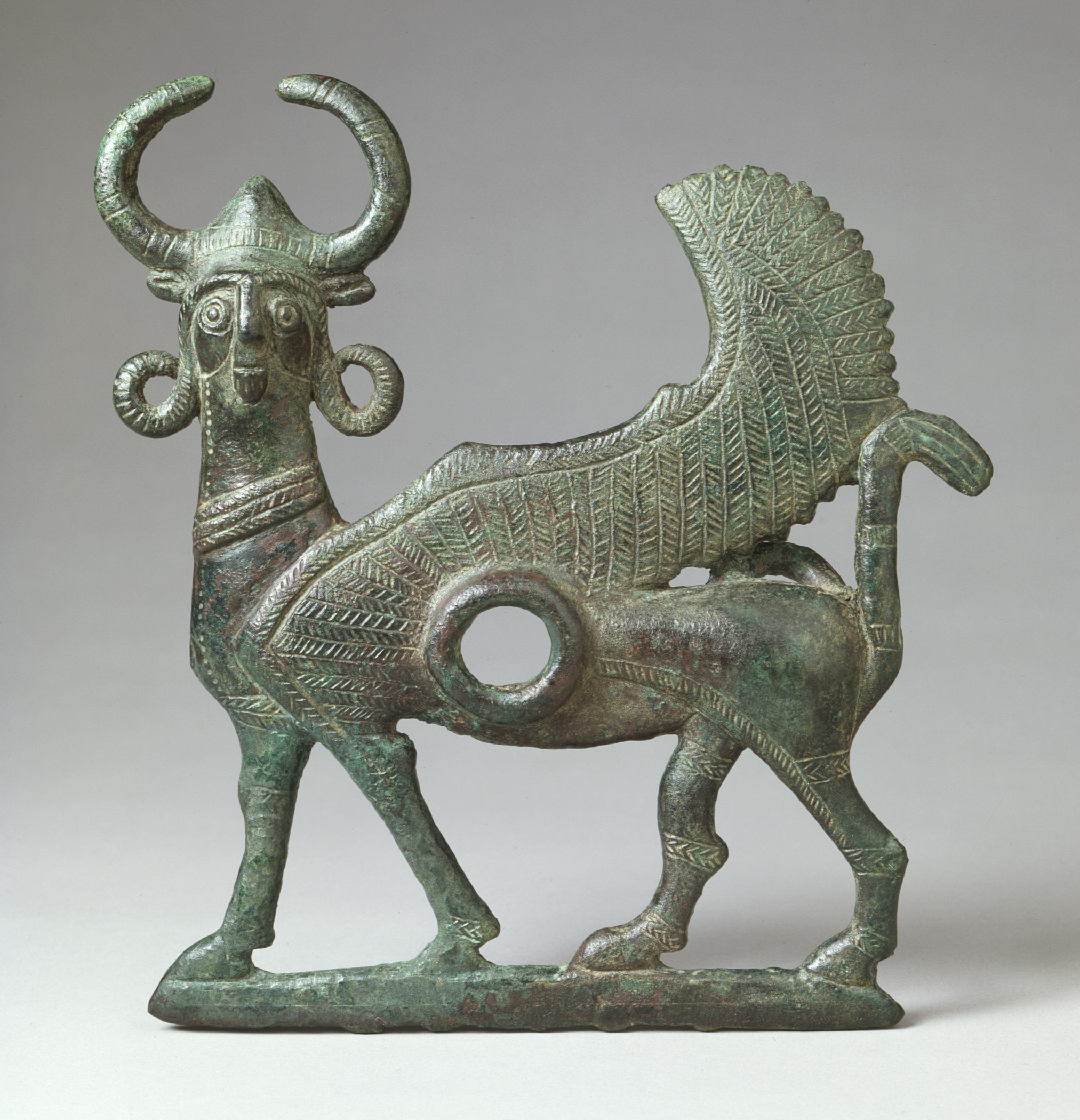
Single plate with a winged sphinx

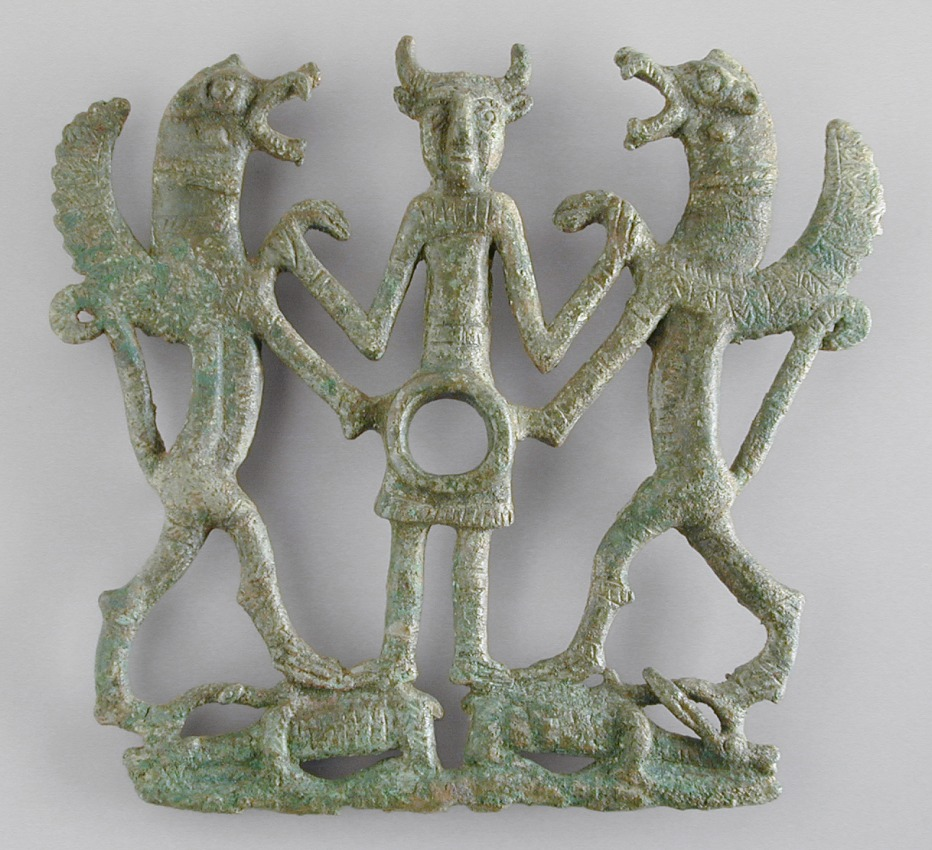
Master of Animals

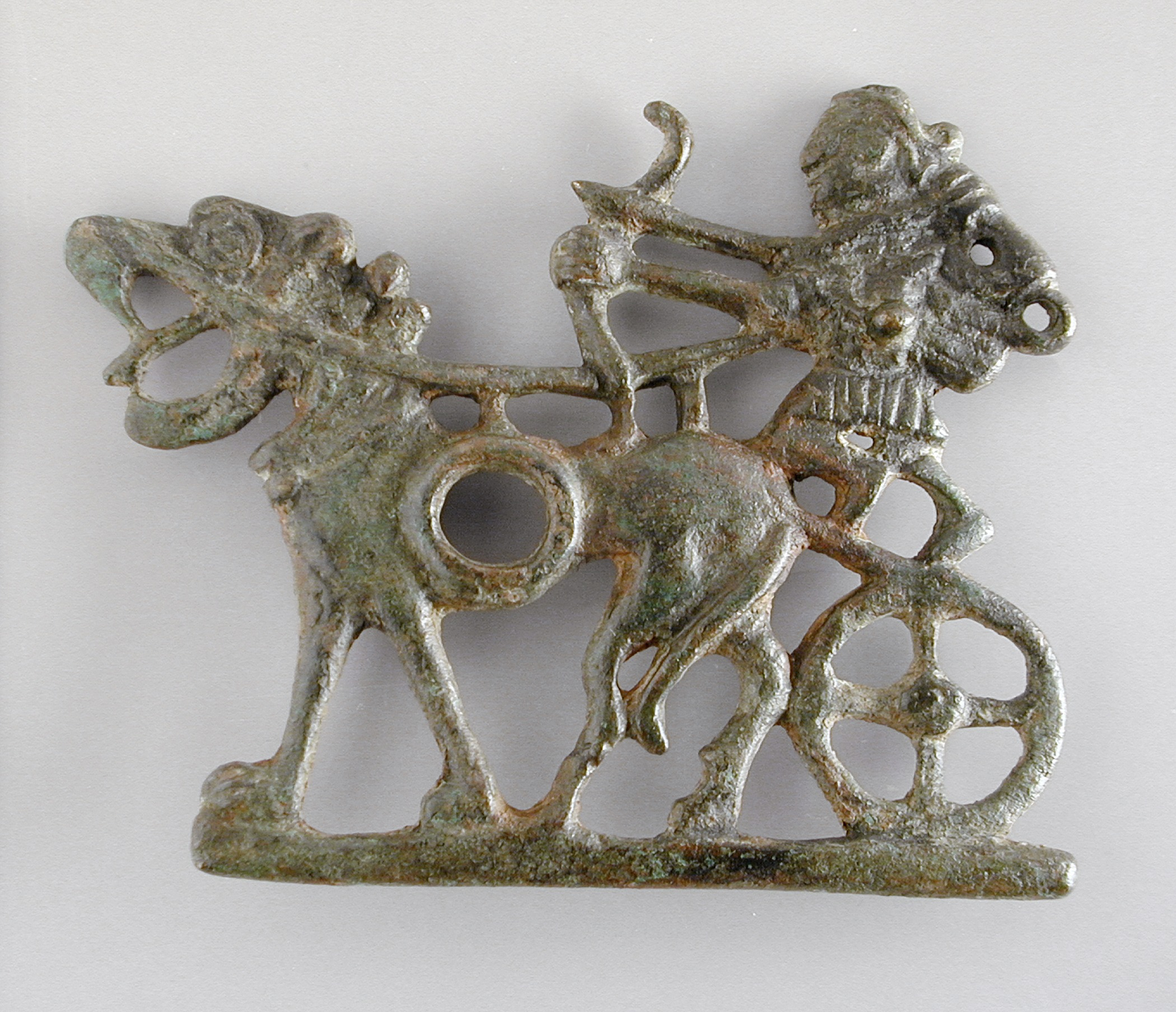
Charioteer

=== Pin heads ===
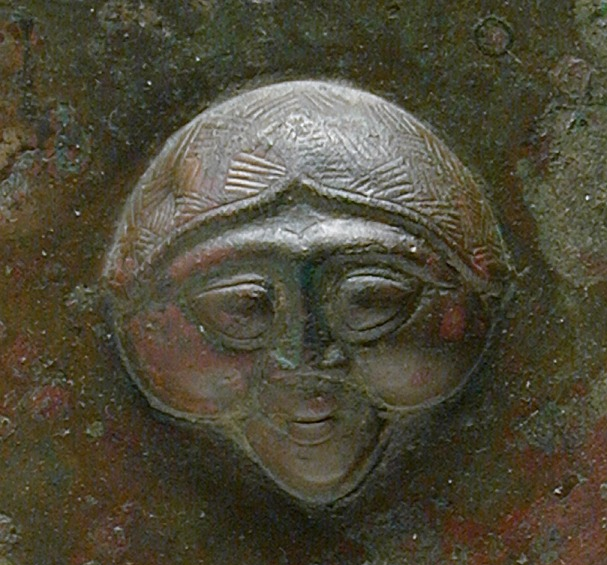
Face from an otherwise undecorated disk pin

Large decorated pin heads are the third common and distinctive type of Luristan bronzes, falling into two distinct groups: sculptural and openwork designs, many using the iconographic repertoire of other types of objects, and flat, normally round, disk heads. Their use is uncertain; they were probably both used as votive offerings, as the numbers found in the excavated temple at Surkh Dum-i-Luri suggests, but also worn as decoration or for fastening clothes. Other uses have been suggested. These have not been found in excavated tombs. Pin heads in bone and faience were also found at Surkh Dum-i-Luri.

The disk-headed pins are made from sheet metal by repoussé and chasing work, engraving and other techniques, so differing from the types described above, which are cast. Many designs centre on a large face, and in general humans predominate over animals in their decoration, another difference to the other types. The diameter of the disk is typically between 6 and 9 centimetres, and the whole pin and head up to about 20 centimetres. Similar large face designs are found on some other plaques of uncertain purpose.

The faces are mostly rounded to fill a circular space, and may be intended as female. They lack beards, and some full figures are clearly female, sitting with open legs displaying a vulva, perhaps shown in childbirth; in other pins this is clearly the case. These pieces were presumably votives for fertility. The eyes are sometimes inlaid in white, with a black dot for the pupil. The face may occupy most of the disk, or be small, at the centre of a wide border with other subjects. Other designs feature a wide range of subjects, with some purely decorative motifs, and others featuring some complex, mainly religious, scenes with many figures ("odd-looking demons and animals apparently involved in cultic and mythological activities", as Muscarella describes them).

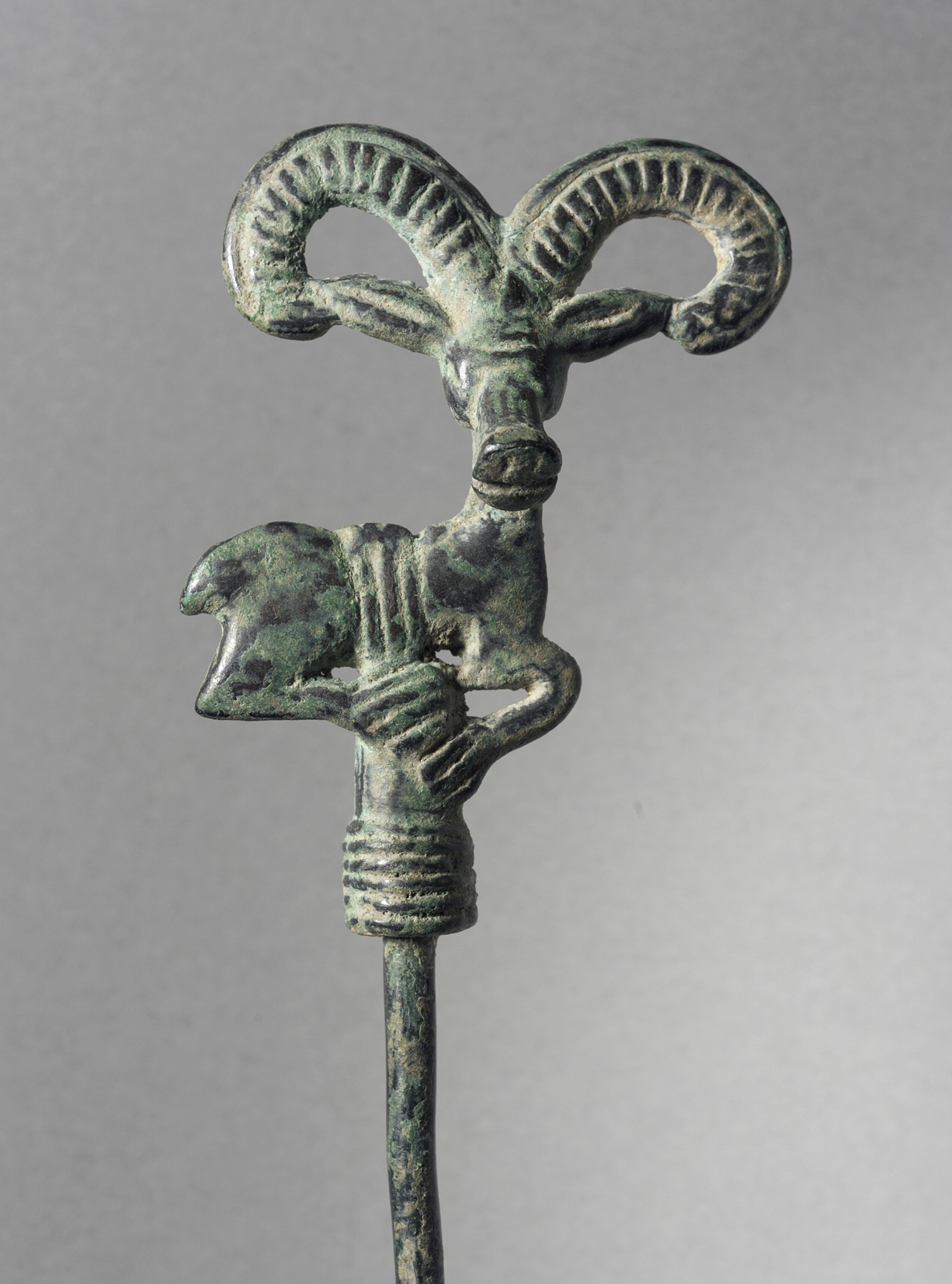
Ibex or mouflon pin head

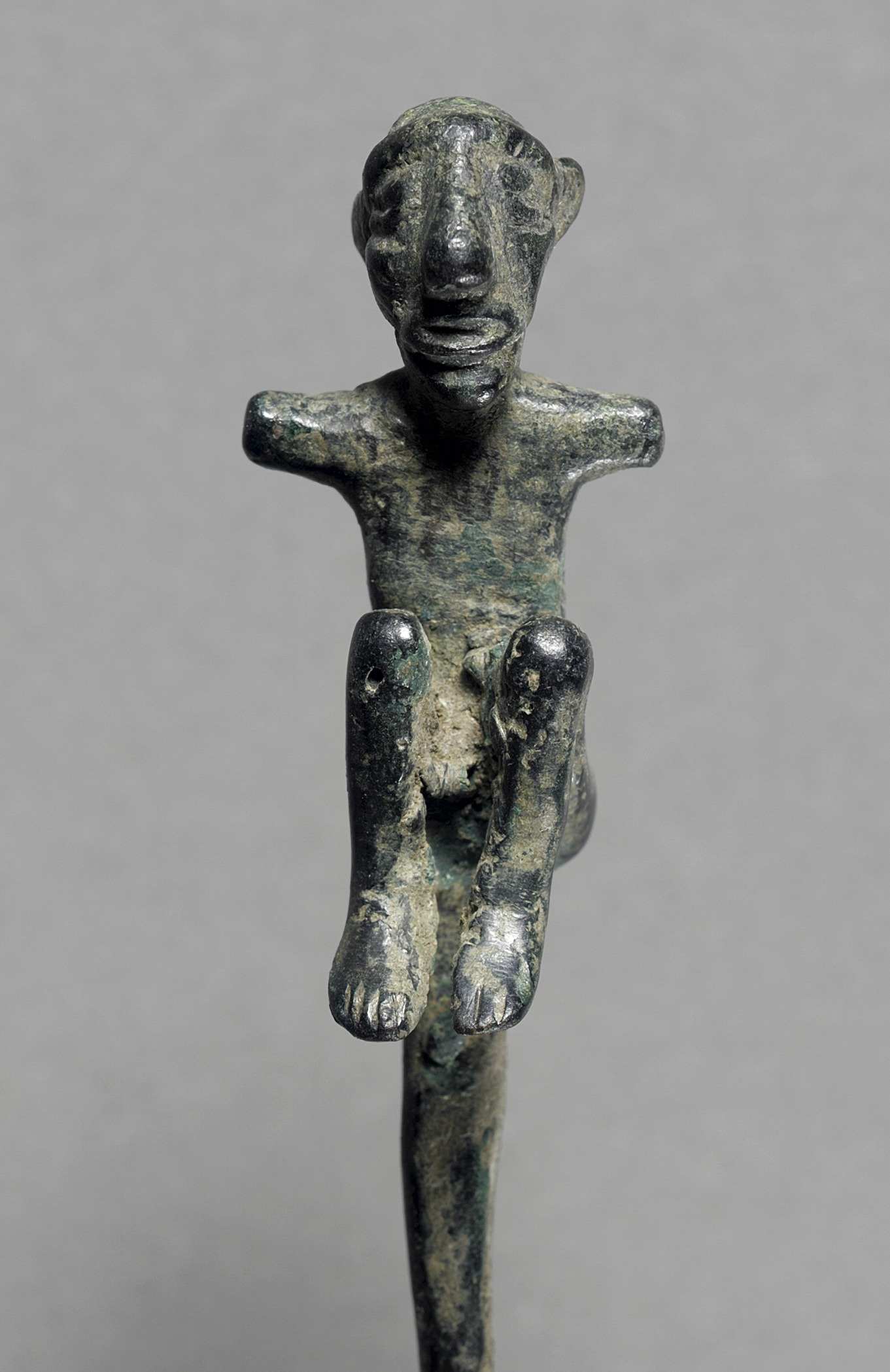
Human on pin head

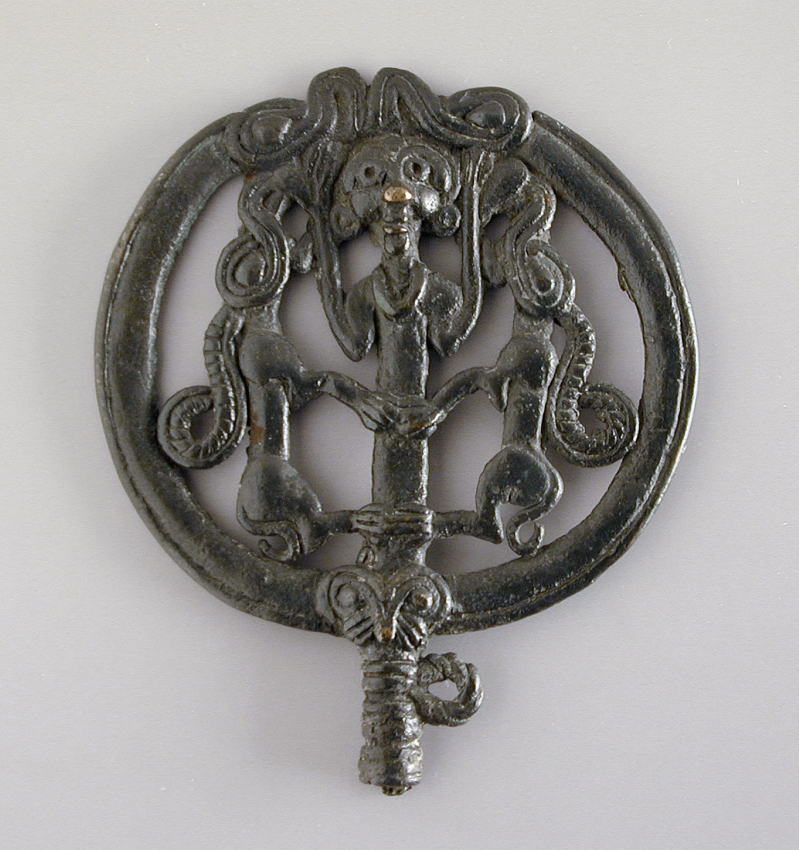
Pinhead with idol standard motif

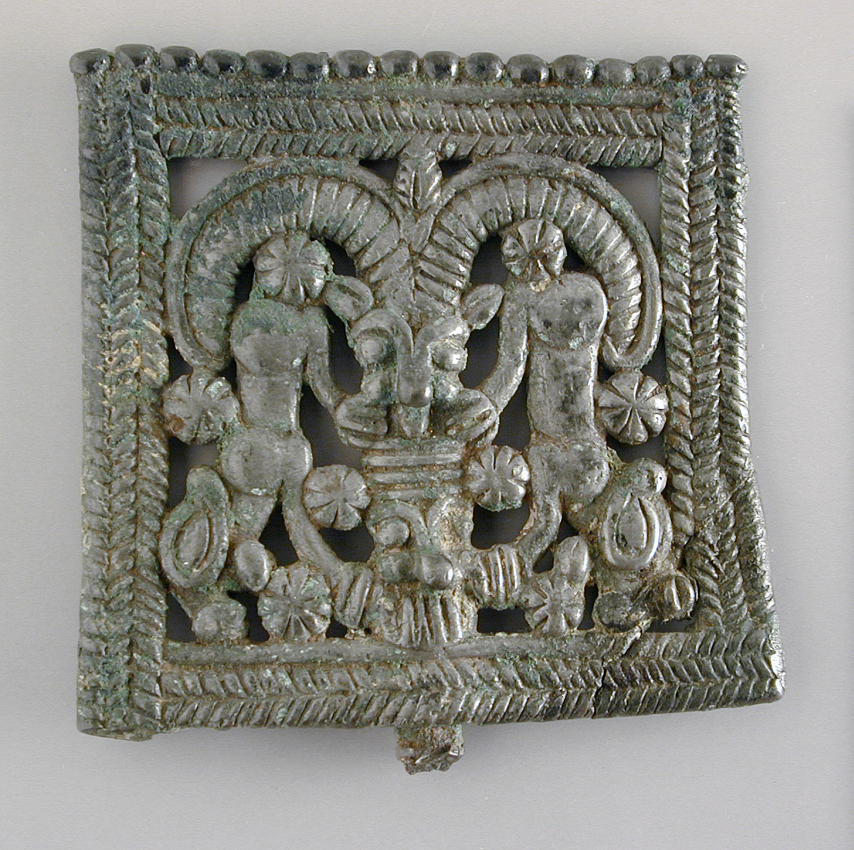
Openwork pin head

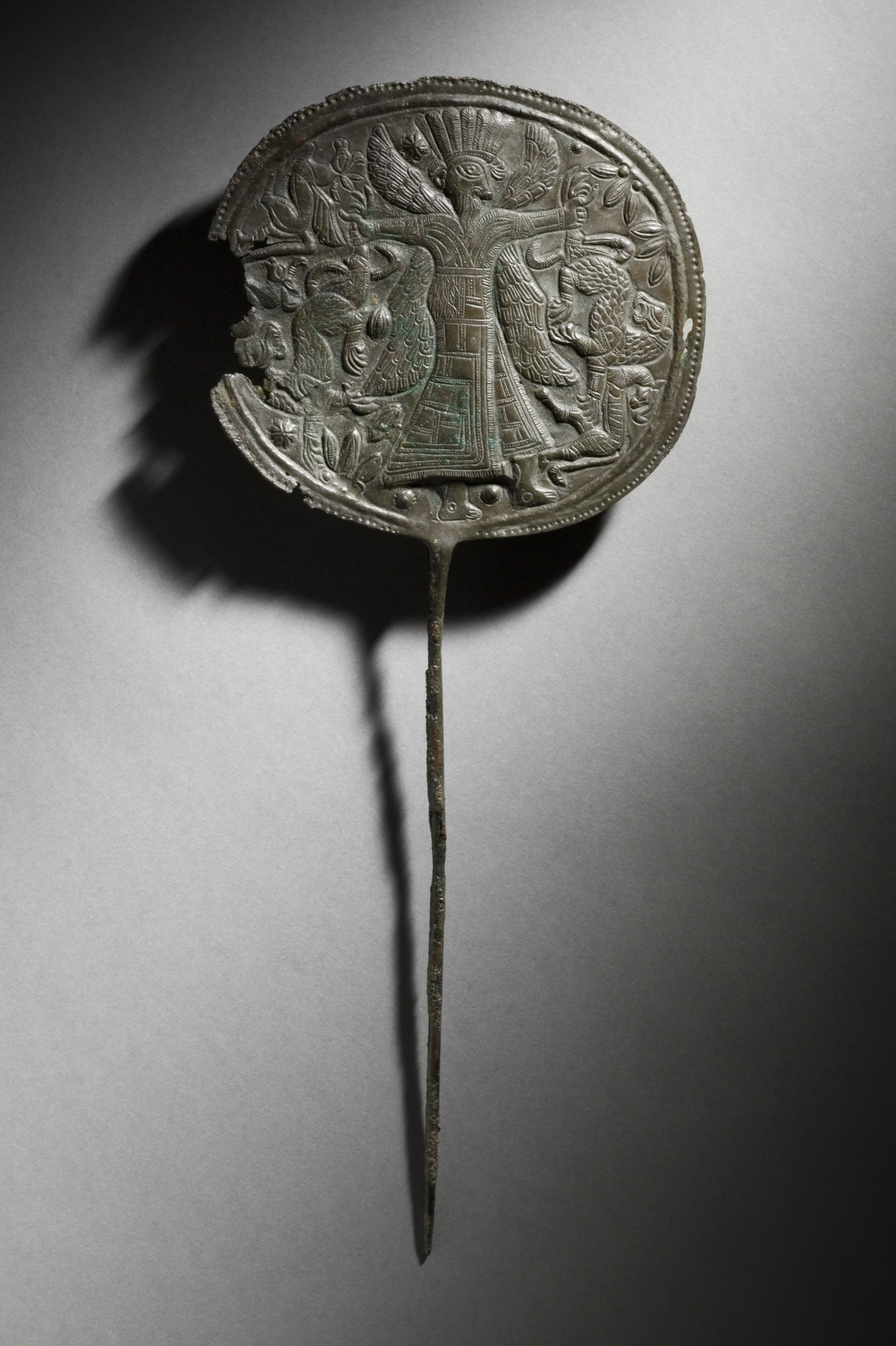
Animal-headed deity as master of animals, holding two panthers by their tails

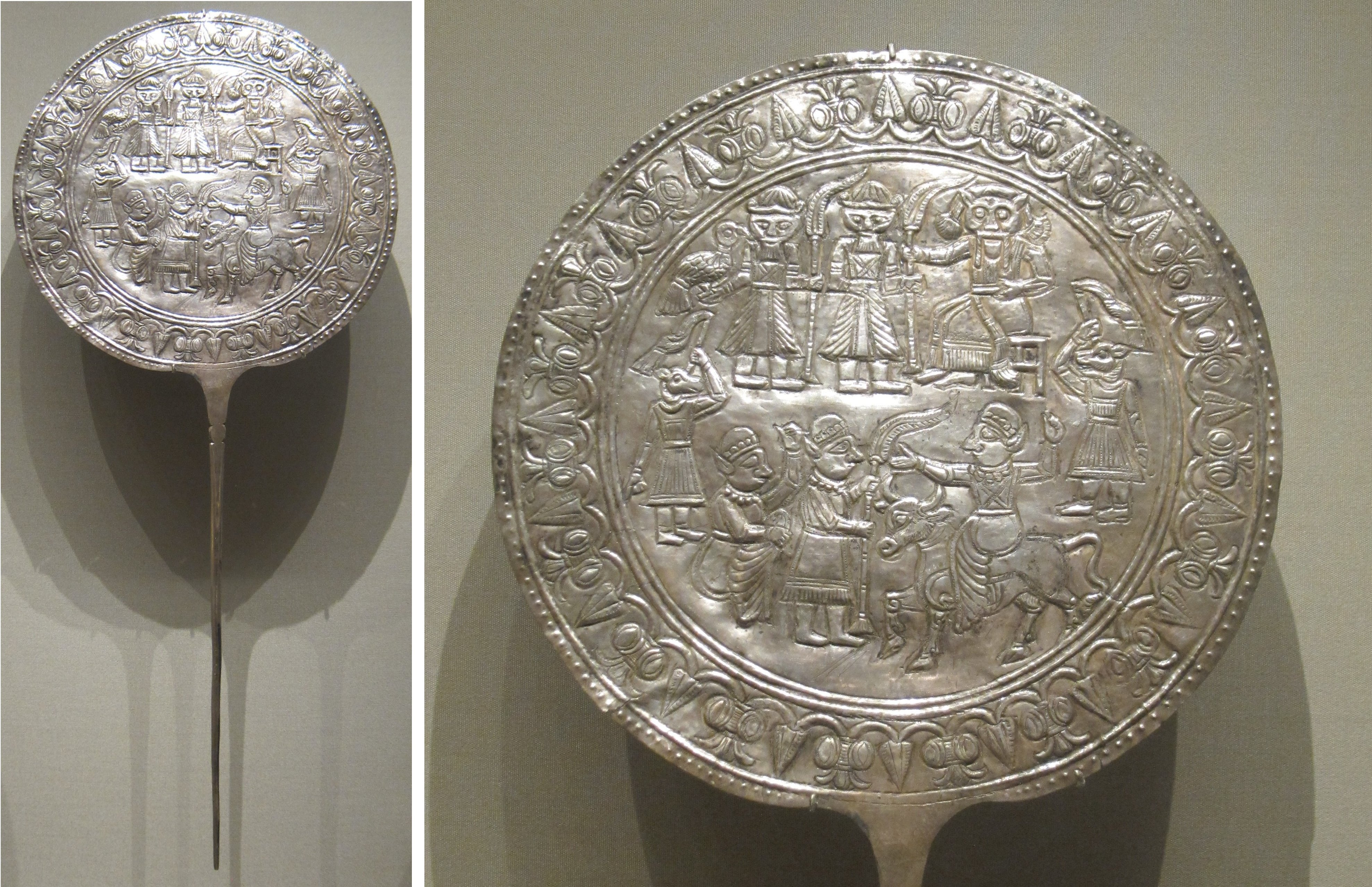
Unusual silver pin with complex scene

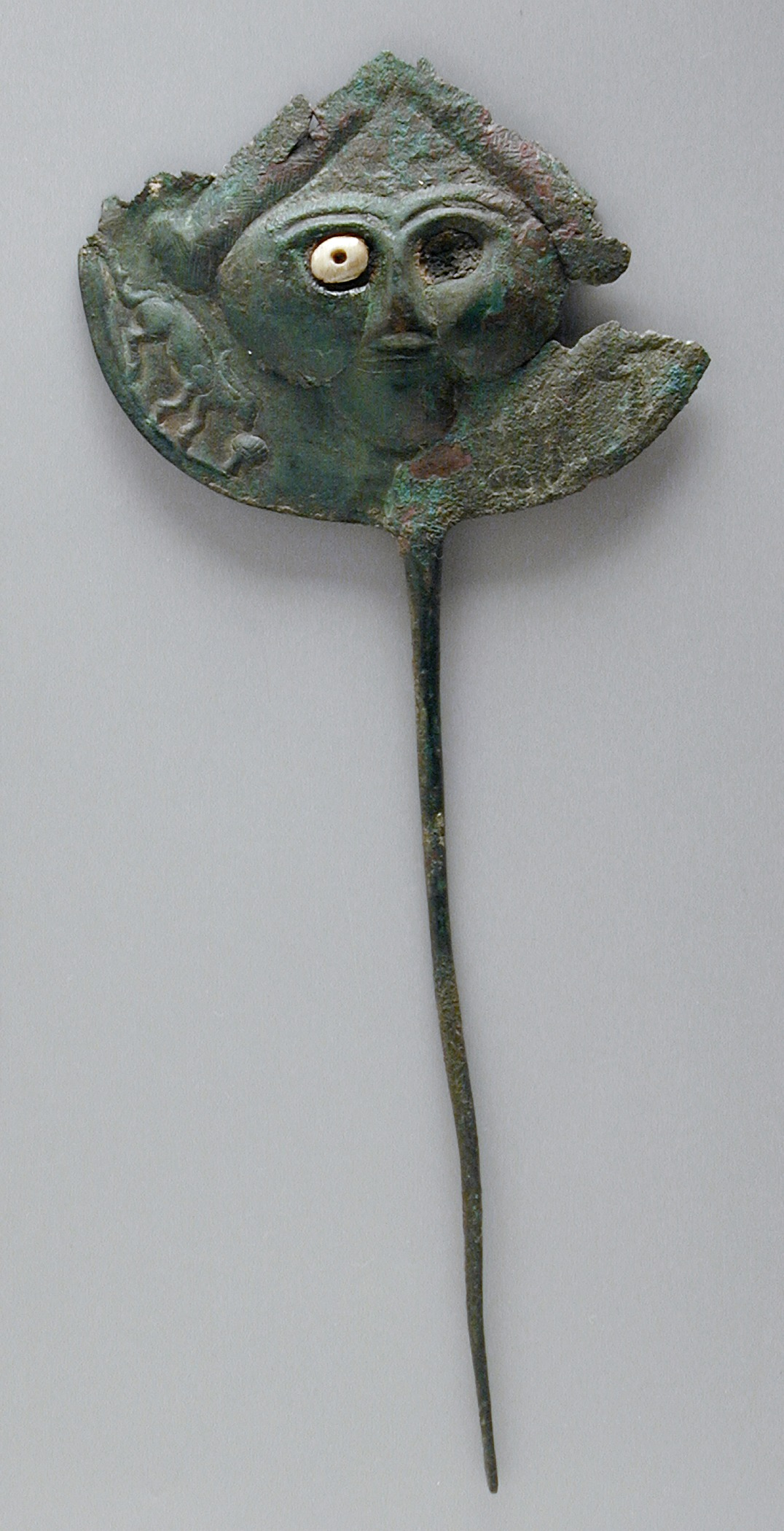
Disk pin; face with one remaining inlaid eye

=== Other types ===
Other types include bronzes centred on a large ring, mostly decorated with animals in way similar to the finials and cheekpieces. These perhaps were part of horse-harnesses. Large socketed pieces are assumed to be handles for whetstones. Other pieces made from sheet metal include sheets for the front covers of quivers, typically divided vertically into registers with small scenes. There are cups and situlae, both with rounded bottoms. Weapons are common, including a type of "spiked axehead" with spreading strips or spikes behind the axehead; these are also found in miniature votive versions. Some examples seem to have had "spikes" that were designed to be functional in combat, others perhaps not. A kind of long "halberd-axe" has the head of an animal perched at the top of the blade, and spikes on the other side. Pieces of bronze jewellery such as rings, bracelets pendants and arm or anklets are also found.

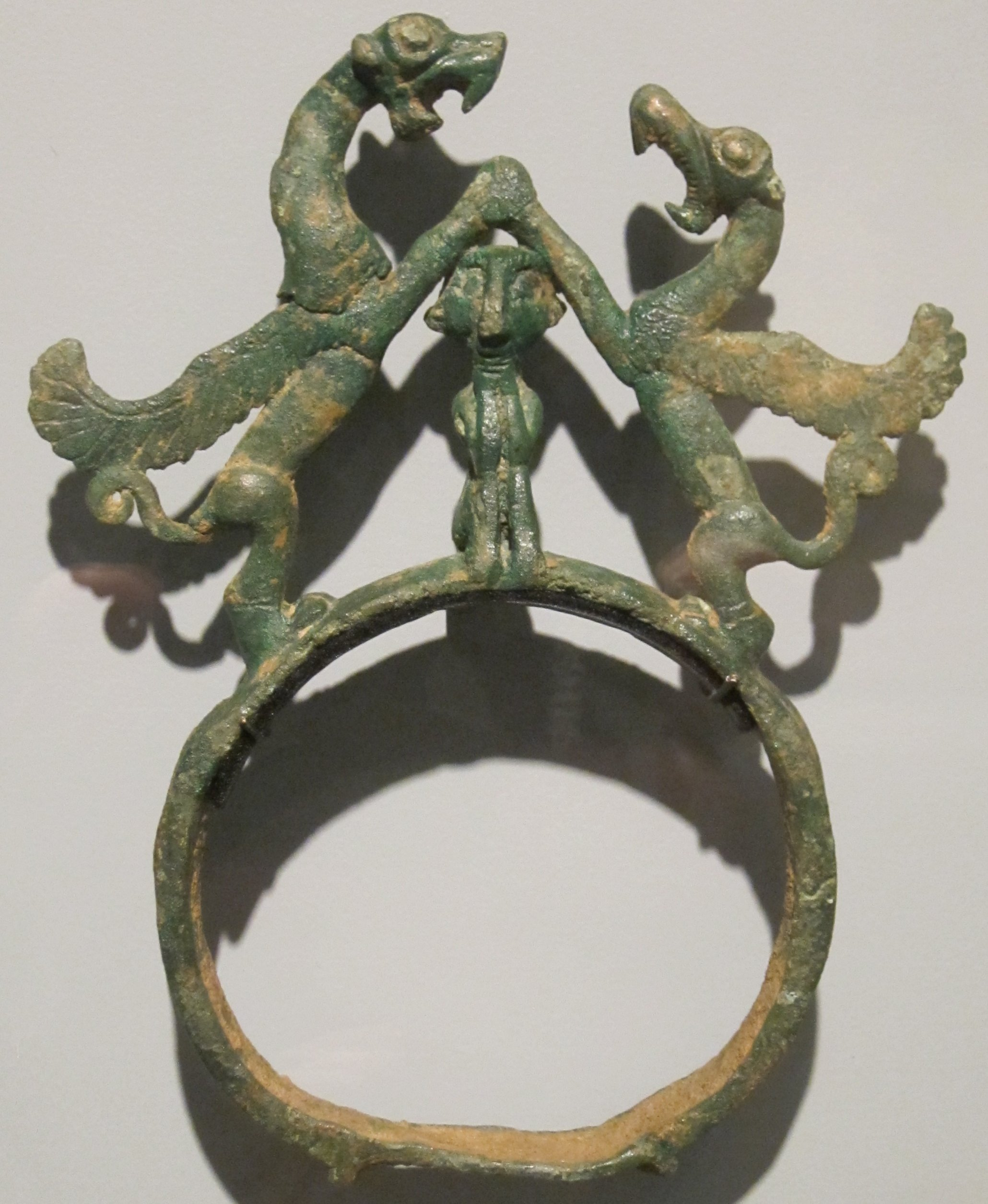
Ring, for harness?

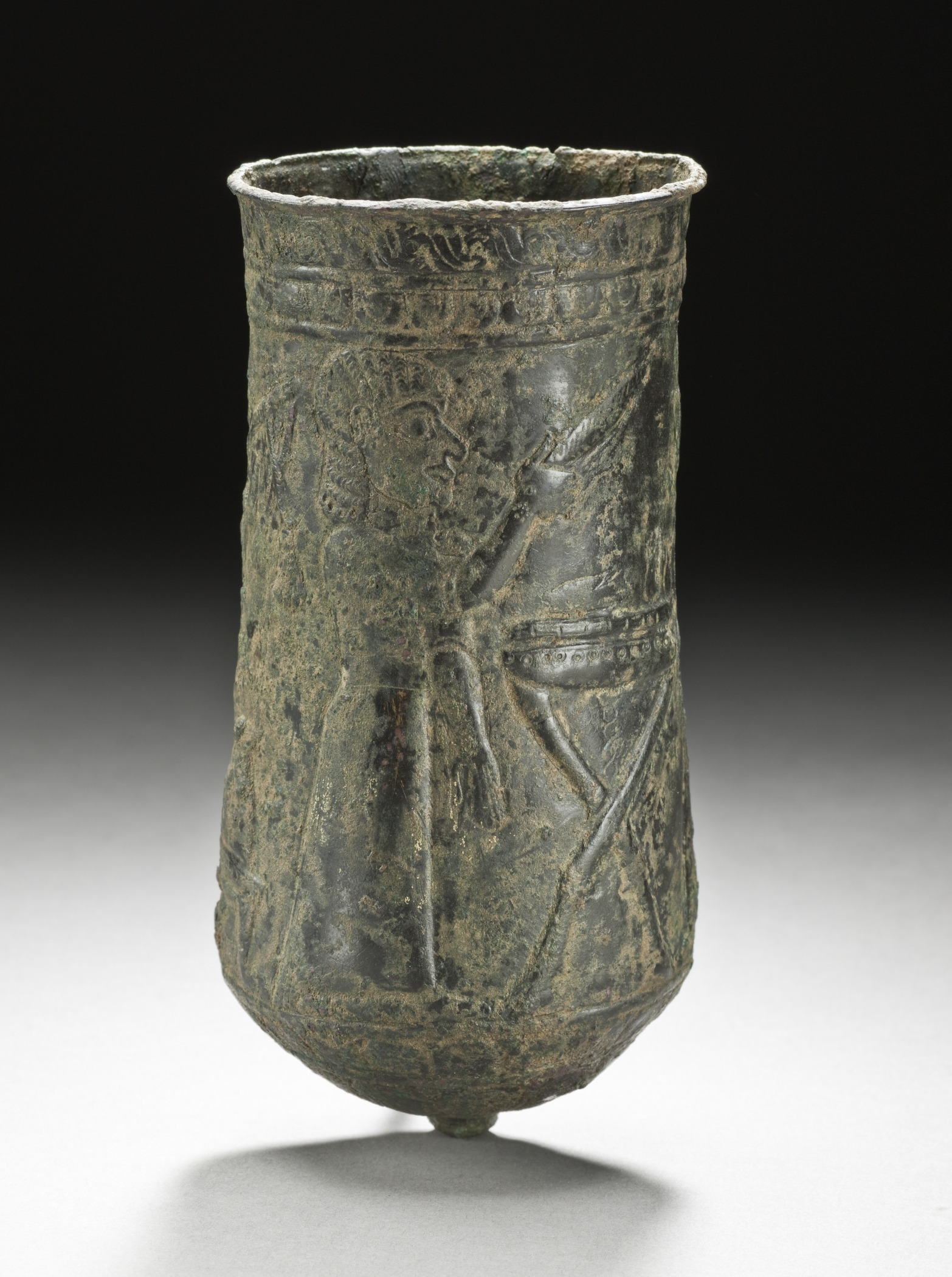
Nipple beaker or situla

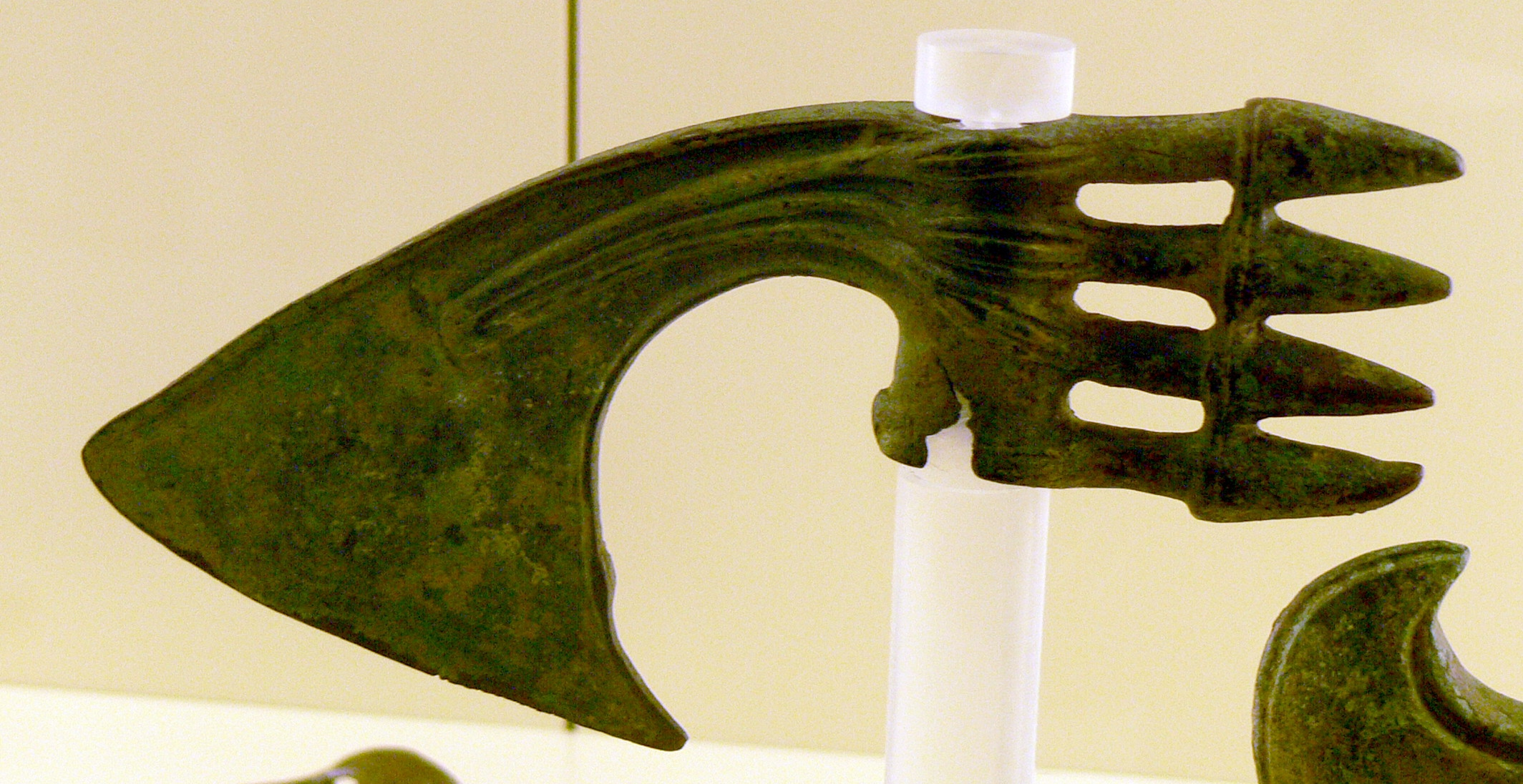
Spiked axehead

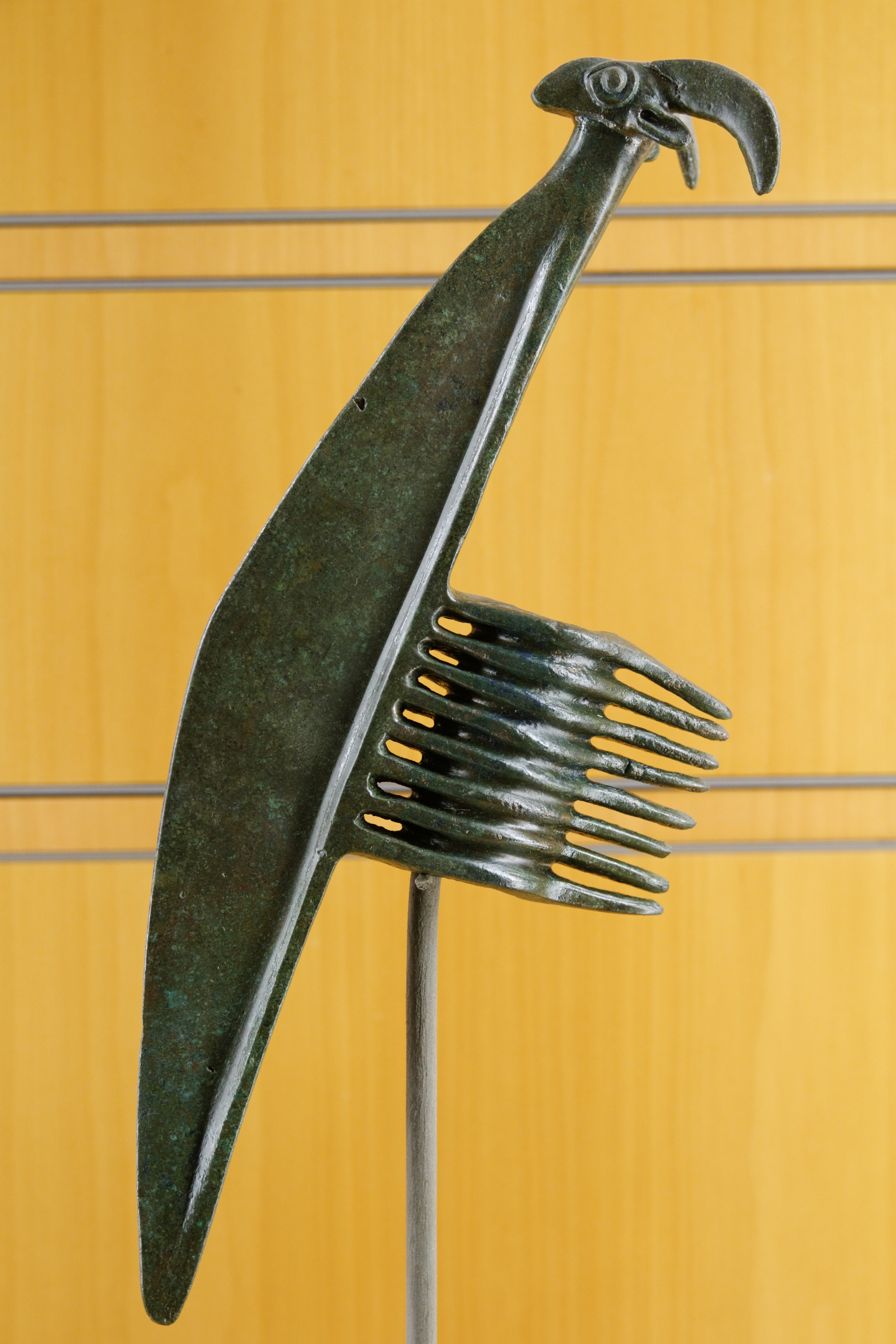
Halberd-axe

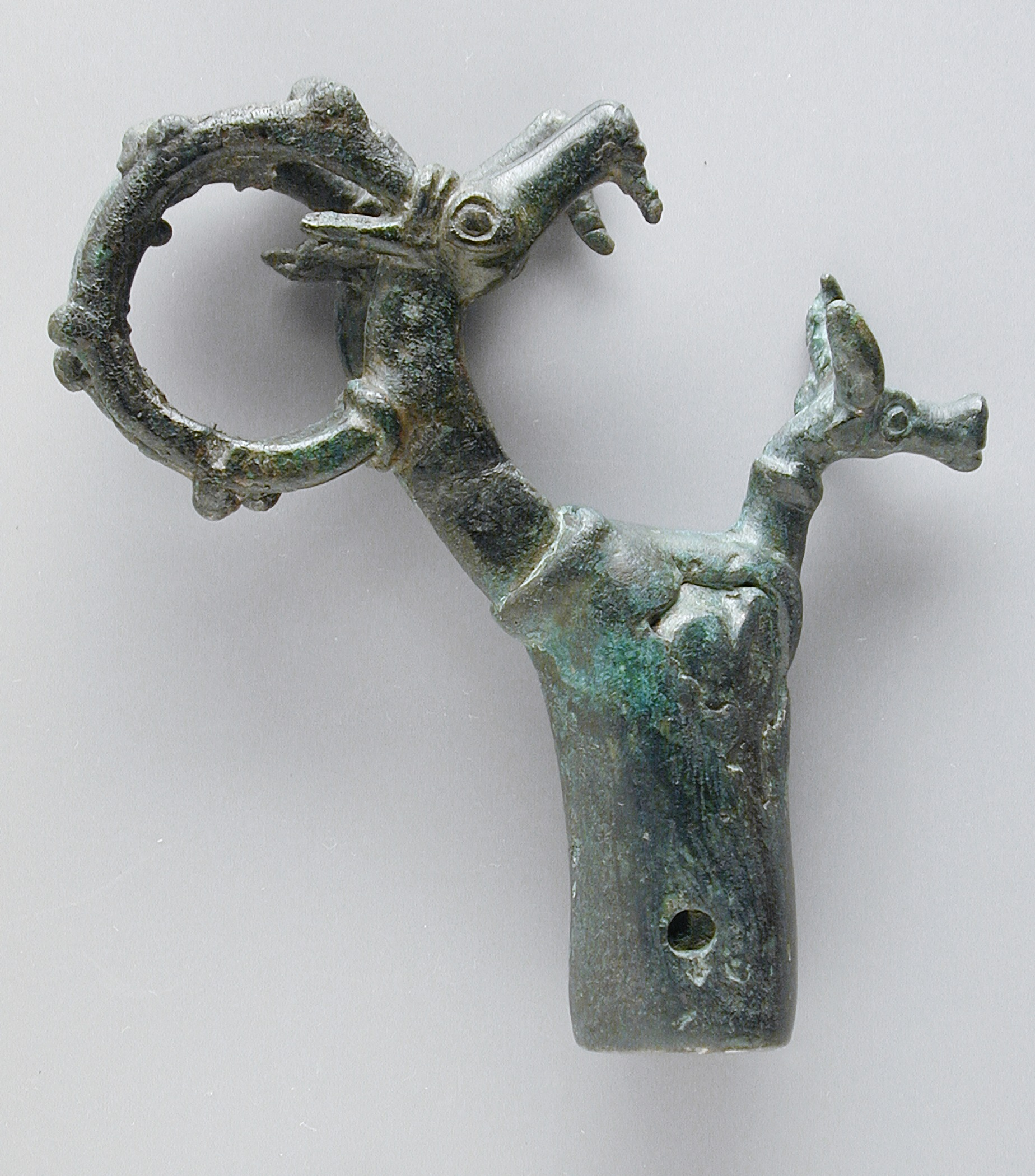
Whetstone socket

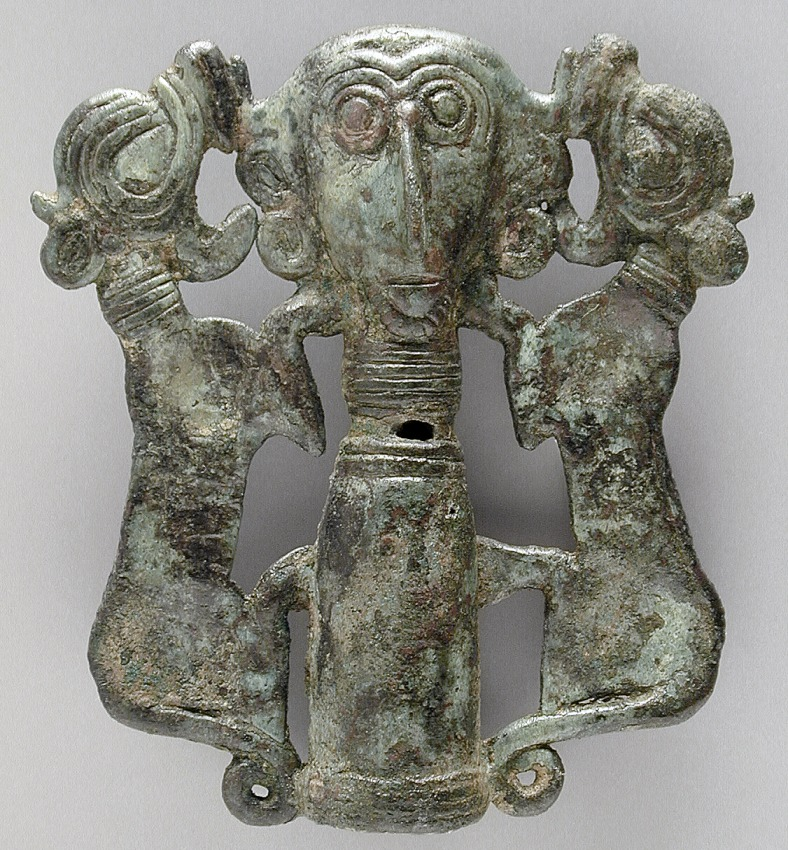
Whetstone socket, Master of Animals

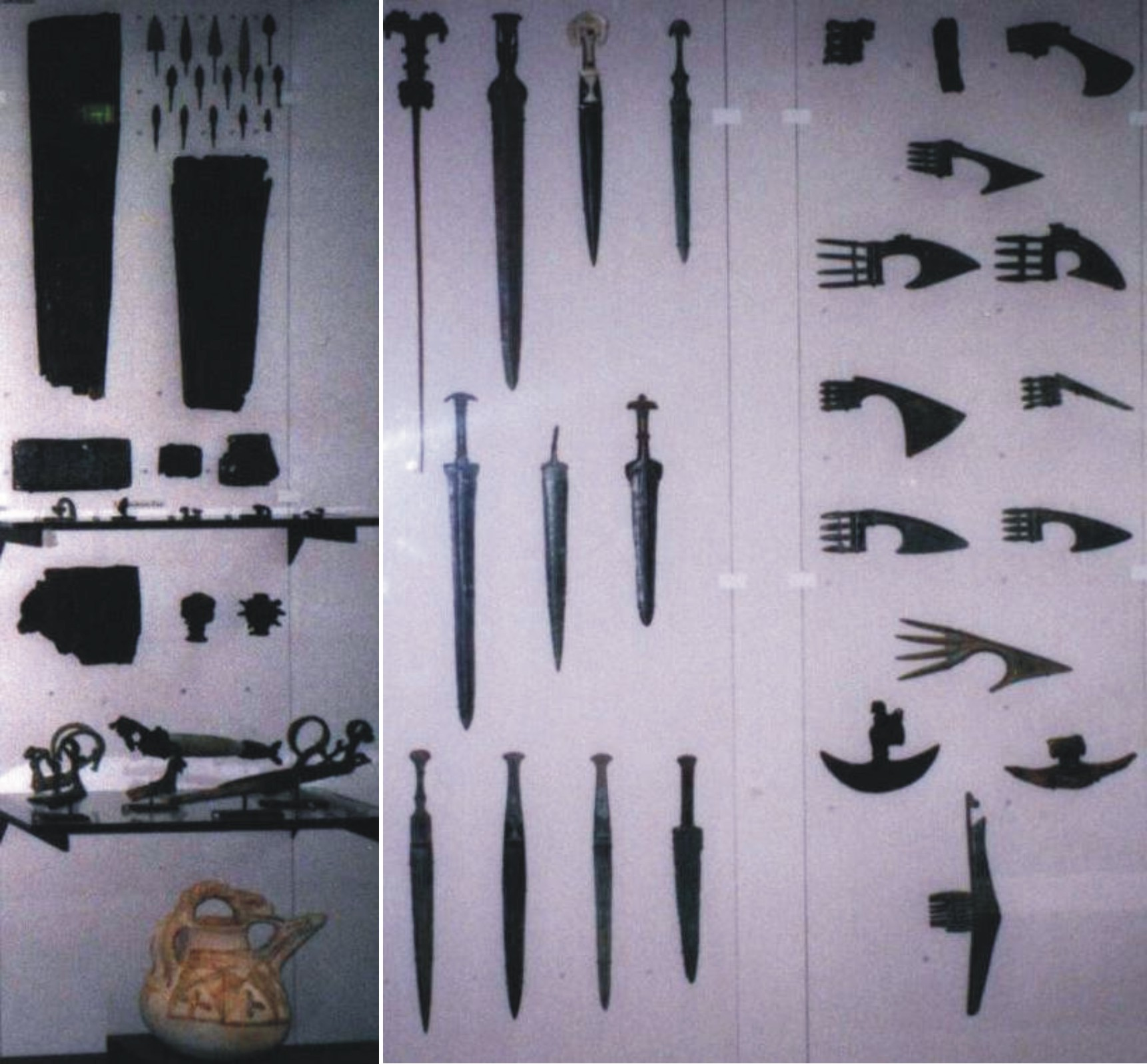
Quiver-cases, swords and spiked and halberd-axes, Louvre

Harness pieces and disc headed pins in the Louvre
