= Erich Schmidt (archaeologist) =

American archaeologist and photographer (1897–1964)

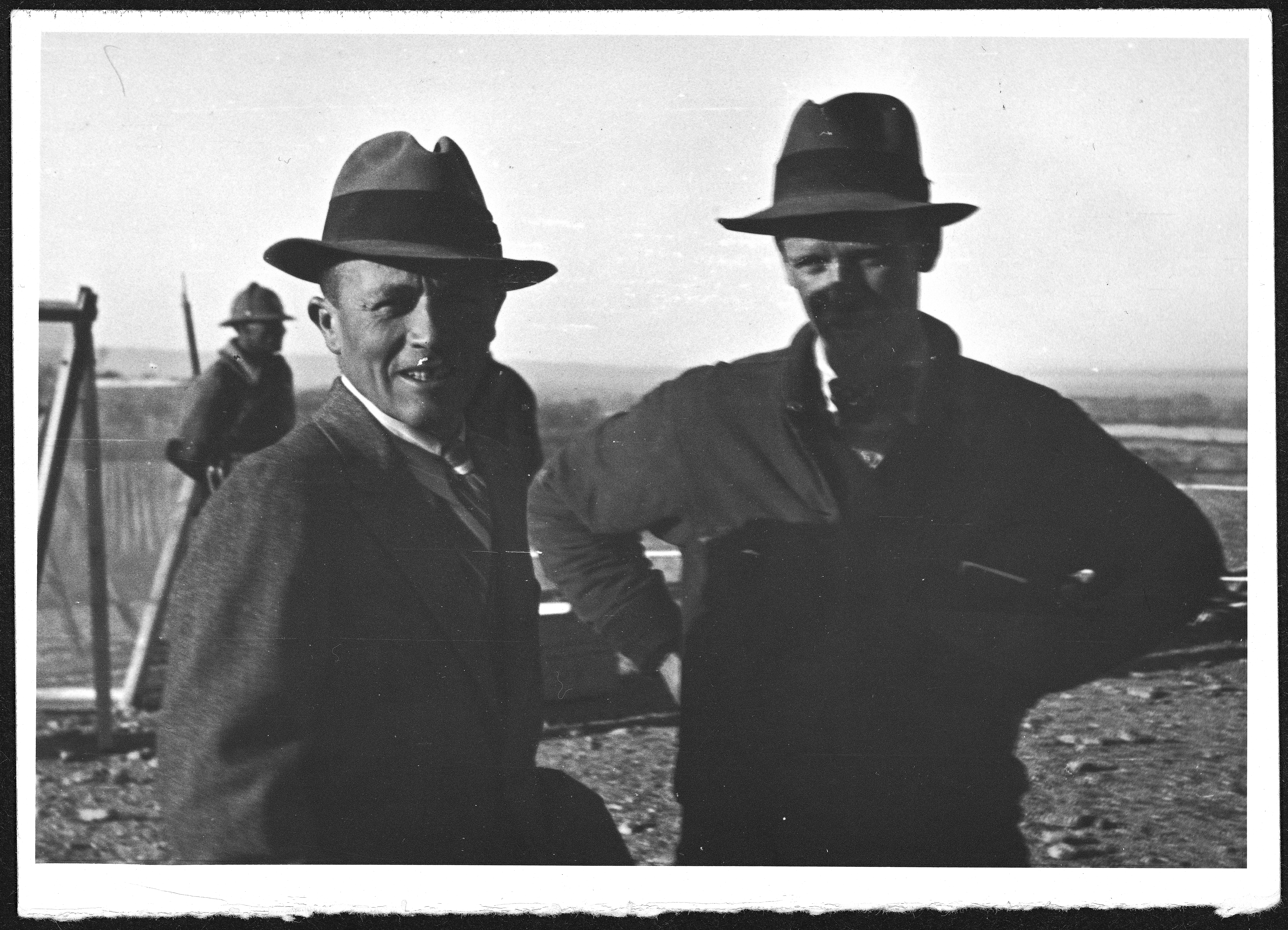
Dr. Erich Schmidt with Georges Miles, assistant director at Rhey, near the citadel

Erich Friedrich Schmidt (September 13, 1897 – October 3, 1964) was a German and American-naturalized archaeologist, born in Baden-Baden. He specialized in Ancient Near East Archaeology, and became professor emeritus at the Oriental Institute of the University of Chicago. He was also a pioneer in using aerial photography in archaeological research.

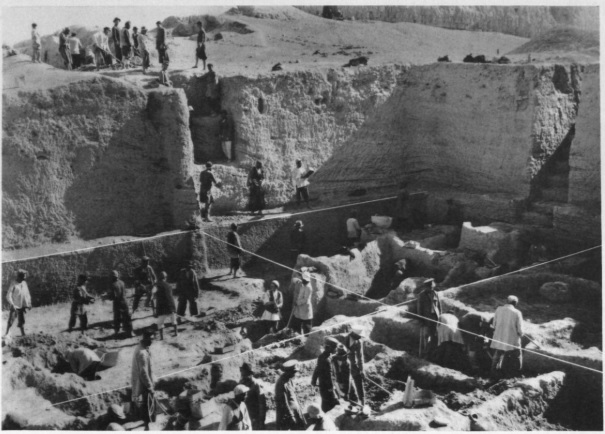
An aerial photo of Cheshmeh Ali Mound in south of Tehran. Explorers and the archaeological team at Teppe Cheshmeh Ali (Cheshmeh Ali mound) in 1936 AD. From book Flights Over Ancient Cities Of Iran by Erich Schmidt

== Biography ==
When he was young, his father died, and Erich was sent to the military school (Kadettenkorps) in Karlsruhe. He graduated in 1914 as a lieutenant in the German Army just as WWI started. He fought in the war with distinction, but then was seriously wounded in the fighting in Austrian Galicia in 1916. After the battle, Schmidt was found by the Russians on the battle field, and spent the next four years in a prisoner-of-war camp. In 1920, he found his way home to Germany. There he learned that his mother and three siblings died in the meantime. Then he attended Friedrich-Wilhelms-Universität (now Humboldt University of Berlin).

In 1923 he moved to the U.S., and studied anthropology at Columbia University, where he was a student of Franz Boas.

From December 1925 through January 1926, Schmidt conducted stratigraphic test excavations at Pueblo Grande and La Ciudad, two Hohokam sites that he later used for his dissertation. He was one of the pioneers of Hohokam studies.

In 1927, James Henry Breasted of the Oriental Institute invited Schmidt to join the Anatolia-Hittite Expedition as an assistant archaeologist.

He became co-director of the Oriental Institute Hittite Expedition, with H.H. Von der Osten, and later on dug in sites such as Surkh Dum-i-Luri and in Tepe Hissar near Damghan, in searching for ancient city Hecatompylos, and Rey. His most celebrated survey took place in Persepolis (Iran), from 1934 up to 1939.

Erich Schmidt was pioneer in aerial photography of archaeological sites, especially in Iran. In 1935, Schmidt had to approach Reza Shah Pahlavi directly for permission to fly over the country. After he obtained it, he made many flights and did a lot of mapping.

He was married twice, in 1934, to Mary-Helen Warden (who later died), and in 1943, to Lura Florence Strawn, with whom they had two children, Richard Roderick and Erika Lura.

Erich died in Santa Barbara, California, in 1964; unfortunately, he was not able to complete many of his plans, and thus much of his excavation work remained unpublished. Some of it was later re-investigated and published by other scholars.

== Works ==
- Time-Relations of Prehistoric Pottery Types in Southern Arizona, Anthropological Papers of the American Museum of Natural History 30, no. 5 (1928)
- Anatolia Through the Ages: Discoveries at the Alishar Mound, 1927-1929 (Chicago, IL: University of Chicago Press, 1931).
- Excavations at Tepe Hissar, Damghan (Philadelphia, PA: University of Pennsylvania Press, 1937).
- Flights Over Ancient Cities of Iran (Chicago, IL: University of Chicago Press, 1940).
- Persepolis I: Structures, Reliefs, Inscriptions (Chicago: University of Chicago Press,1953).
- Persepolis II: Contents of the Treasury and Other Discoveries (Chicago: University of Chicago Press, 1957).
- Persepolis III: The Royal Tombs and Other Monuments (Chicago: University of Chicago Press, 1970).
- The Treasury of Persepolis and Other Discoveries in the Homeland of the Achaemenians, OIC 21 (Chicago: University of Chicago Press, 1939);
