= Surkh Dum-i-Luri =

- Surkh Dum
- Location within Iran
- 33°30′23″N 47°22′28″E
- Type: settlement
- Periods: Middle Bronze Age Late Bronze Age, Iron Age III
- Location: Lorestan province, Iran

History
- Built: Early 2nd millennium BC

Site notes
- Excavation dates: 1938
- Archaeologists: Erich Schmidt
- Condition: Ruined
- Owner: Public
- Public access: Yes

Surkh Dum-i-Luri ("Red Slope of the Lurs"), also referred to as "Surkh Dum", "Surkah Dum", "Surkh-i Dum", and "Dum Surkh", in the Kuhdasht valley of Lorestan province in the southeast of modern Iran, is an ancient Near East archaeological site. It lies 10 kilometers of southeast of Koohdasht city. The ancient name of the town or its region are unknown. Very few results and finds were published after the sites excavation in 1938 but in recent years many more results have been published. A number of forgeries, purported to have a provenance of Surkh Dum-i-Luri, have appeared on the antiquities market. Many looted exemplars from the Luristan region have made their way into the museums of the world.

Not to be confused with Surkh Dum-i-Lakki, "Red Slope of the Lakks", also on the Kuhdasht plain.

== Archaeology ==
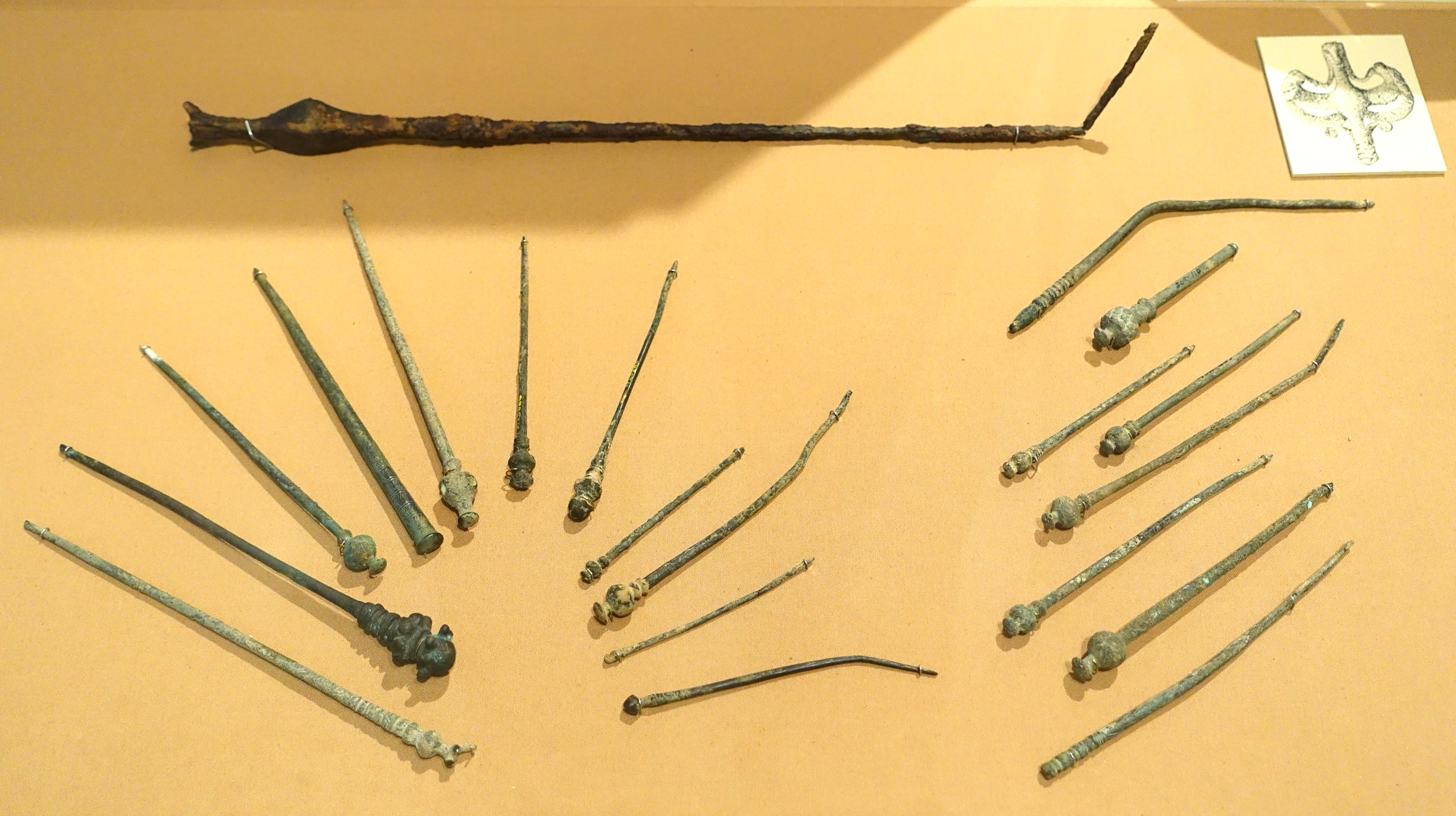
Cast metal pins - Surkh Dum-i-Luri site, c. 800-650 BC - Oriental Institute Museum, University of Chicago

The site was spotted by aerial surveying during the Second Holmes Expedition to Iran led by Erich Schmidt which focused primarily on Persepolis, Naqsh-i Rustam, Tall-i Bakun, and Tepe Hissar. Archaeological remains had recently been spotted at the site and looters had begun operating there for a month before the excavation began finding, in one location, "bronze pins, fragments of bronze vessels, and other artifacts" but that was stopped by the authorities.

"During the past ten years the Lur mountaineers have thoroughly plundered the cemeteries of their ancient predecessors. Almost every spot in Luristan which showed any surface indications of burials has been dug."

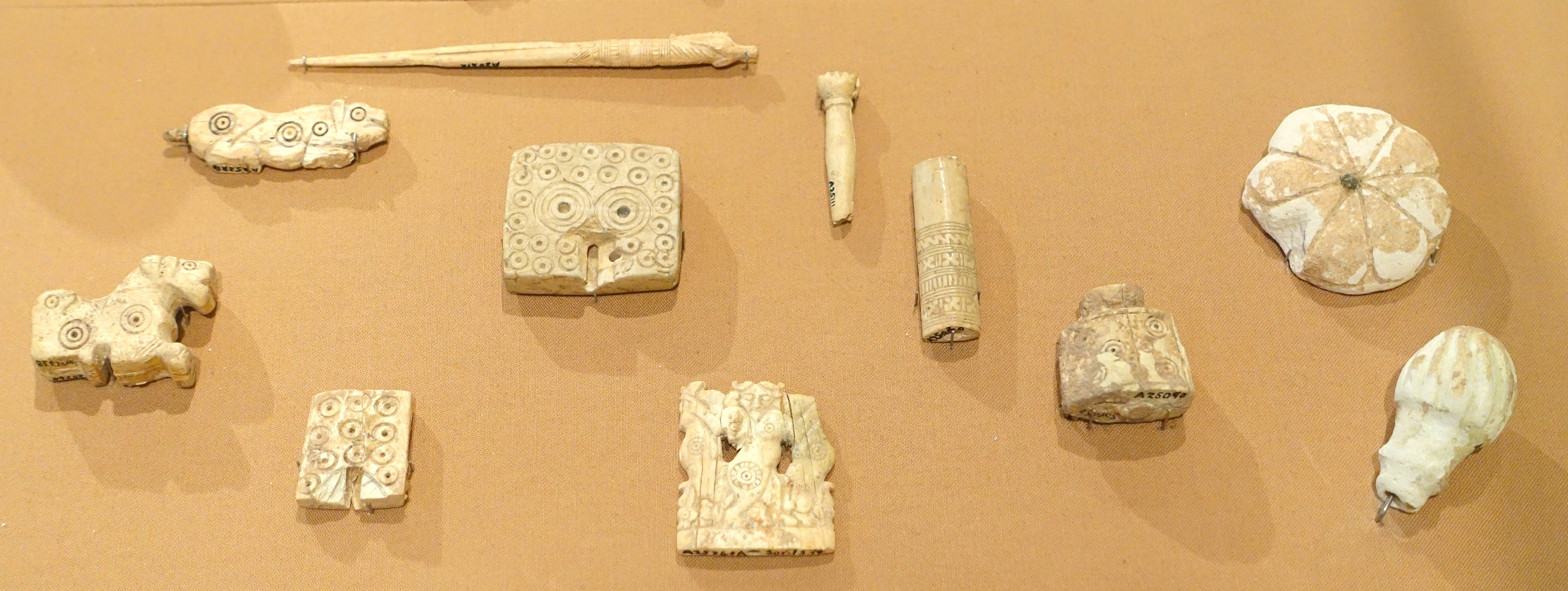
Pins and pin heads made of bone and faience - Surkh Dum-i-Luri site, c. 800-650 BC - Oriental Institute Museum, University of Chicago

Traces of boulder walls were noted on the surface. The site was excavated, with Maurits N. van Loon and Richard C. Haines) for 19 days from June 7 to June 25, 1938, with 30 workers. Nine 10 meter by 10 meter areas QH, II, IJ, JH, JI, JJ, KG, KH, and KI) were excavated at the main building.The plan of the building was recovered and determined to be a temple (usually refereed to as a sanctuary at this site) of the first half millennium BC. A terraced square was found in the center of the main room and deemed to be an altar. This work also revealed the entrance of another building facing the main building across a wide street. One sounding (GK) was dug northeast and up slope of the main building finding "portions of additional heavy-walled buildings with parallel, narrow rooms and jogs in their exterior walls, separated by a street" and pottery sherds. The small finds included a ram-headed stone pestle, arrowheads (16 bronze, 2 iron), bronze mirrors, male and female figurines in frit as well as bronze, and most notably about 200 stamp seals and cylinder seals (some with Kassite period cuneiform inscriptions), many embedded in the walls and floors. A Giyan III cemetery 200 meters west was also excavated.

Finds included one Harappan etched carnelian bead which was found in an Iron AGE III context but dated to much earlier. Embedded into the walls were a number of sheet metal headed bronze pins. Another notable find, in an 8th-century BC context, was a bronze spike-butted axe-head with lion mask.

=== Periodization ===
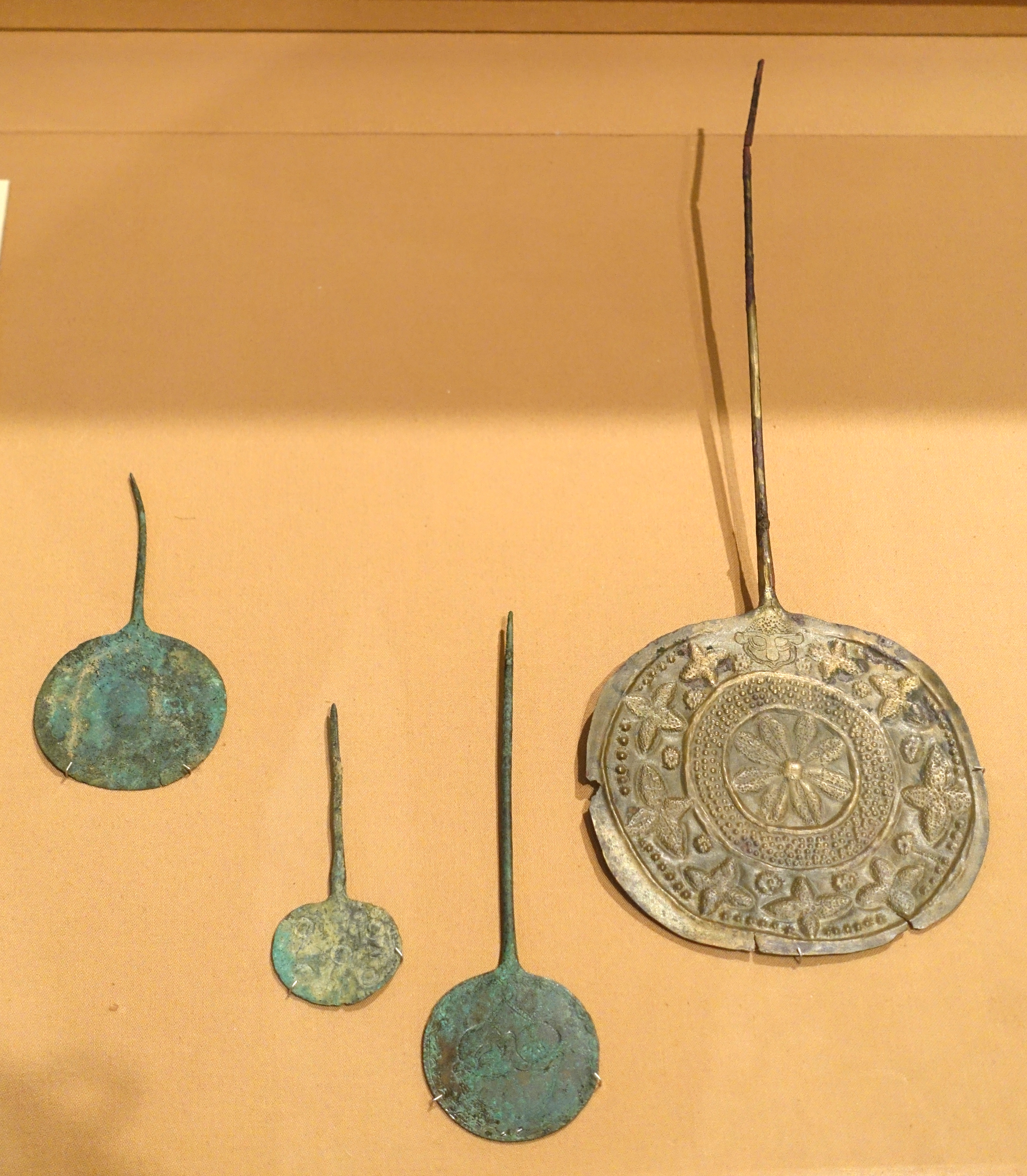
Disc-headed pins - Surkh Dum-i-Luri site, c. 800-650 BC - Oriental Institute Museum, University of Chicago

The main building had three construction levels (the specific dating of the Iron Age sublevels is debated by researchers):

- Level 3 - Two sublevels with 3B Dated by the excavators to the Late Bronze Age and 3A to the Early Iron Age. Built with 1.5 meter wide stone walls. Large pained jars were found, primarily in what appeared to be a storeroom. As in all levels buried hoards were found, ascribed to the next earlier level.
- Level 2 - The main building level, Iron Age. Three sublevels were determined (2C, 2B, and 2A). One area of the building in this level had been damaged by robber pits. Walls were about 1 meter in width and the many roomed building was deemed a sanctuary based on the find of an altar and many objects dedicated to the goddess Ninlil. In one room of level 2C, "many pins, cylinder seals, necklaces, and other disused items from the temple inventory had been incorporated by way of foundation deposits" which is typical for temples of this time and a similar deposit was found on Level 2B. Building plan lterations in Levels 2B and 2A were relatively small.
- Level 1 - The final construction level was 1B and Level I was used by the excavators designate unstratified surface and subsurface finds. Notably faience appears in 1B including a "Green faience beaker with handle in the shape of a kneeling human-headed bull".

=== Seals ===
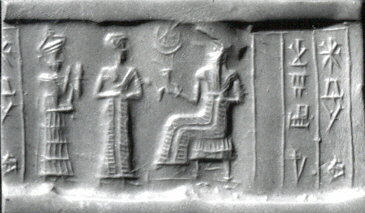
Cylinder seal and modern impression Presentation scene,ca. 2000–1750 B.C. Isin-Larsa found at Surkh Dum-i-Luri

Nine Middle and Late Chalcolithic stamp seals and three Late Chaclolithic cylinder seals were found at Surkh Dum-i-Luri. Thirty two Bronze Age cylinder seals were found at the site including 9 from the Old Babylonian period, 4 from the Early Middle Elamite period, and others from the Kassite, Mitanni, and Middle Assyrian periods. A total of 168 Iron Age cylinder seals were recovered at Surkh Dum-i-Luri with most ascribed to Elamite sources. Many are made from bitumen, 4 from bronze, and a few from faience. Thirty two stamp seals were also recovered as well as a few signet rings. It has been suggested that the finds included two Neo-Elamite cylinder seals. Some of the seals were inscribed however the epigrapher had to work from photographs of the objects and not the originals the reading of some is not fully certain. One certain exemplar, a chalcedony seal found in Level 2B and dated to 14th century BC, read "Ilī-rabi, ša-rēši official of Kurigalzu, obedient to [the god] Marduk". The term "ša rēši" indicates that Ilī-rabi would have been a courtier eunuch. There is no way to determine which Kassite ruler Kurigalzu I or Kurigalzu II is correct here. No actual clay sealing were found though this may have been due to the short excavation period.

== History ==
Based on finds the site is thought to have been occupied beginning in the early 2nd millennium BC. Due to the short excavation it is not certain if those finds were heirlooms and hence did not reflect occupation. Graves from the Middle Bornze Age were found and there are sufficient finds to say that the site was occupied in the Late Bronze Age. The site's primary period of occupation was from the 9th century BC until the 7th century BC after which it was abandoned (c. 650 BC).

== See also ==
- Cities of the ancient Near East
- Chronology of the ancient Near East
- Tepe Yahya
- Tepe Sialk
