= Awan (ancient city) =

Ancient city-state or region of Elam in the western area of modern-day Iran

- 𒀀𒉿𒀭𒆠 (Sumerian)
- Location within Iran
- 33°29′13.6″N 48°21′13.7″E
- Type: City
- Periods: Early Dynastic I, II, and III, Akkadian, Ur III, Old Elamite I
- Cultures: Elam
- Associated with: Elamites
- Location: Uncertain; somewhere in the Lorestan province of the Islamic Republic of Iran
- Region: Western Iran

History
- Built: c. 2600 BC
- Abandoned: c. 2015 BC

Site notes
- Condition: Lost city

Awan (Sumerian cuneiform: 𒀀𒉿𒀭𒆠 a-wa-an^{ki}, "Country of Awan") was an ancient city-state or region of Elam in the western area of modern-day Iran. It often appears together with the cities of Susa and Anshan in the early history of Mesopotamia, having many conflictual interactions with Sumer.

While in the 3rd millennium BC Awan referred to southeastern Khuzestan and the adjoining Iranian highlands, extending to the east as far as Anshan and Marhashi (Parahshum) it has been suggested that Awan was actually only a term used interchangeably by Mesopotamian sources for Elam in the 2nd millennium BC Old Babylonian period.

== Location ==
Awan

Possible location of Awan. The approximate Bronze Age extension of the Persian Gulf is shown.

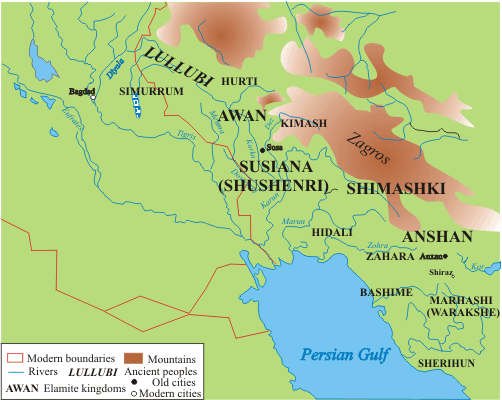
The territory of Awan and related polities in the Mesopotamia area circa 2000 BC.

The city of Awan still has not been located archaeologically. Given the 15th year name of Ibbi-Sin, the fifth and last ruler of the Ur III empire "The year Ibbi-Sîn, king of Ur, roared like a storm against Susa, Adamdun, (and) the land of Awan; made them submit in a single day; and took their lord(s) as bound captive(s)" Awan is thought to be close to Susa and Adamdun (possibly Tepe Surkhegan).

An inscription of Rimush (c. 2279–2270 BC) second ruler of the Akkadian Empire states that he fought a battle "between Awan and Susa" near the "Qablitum River" (Qablitum=Middle).

"<Rimus, king of the world, in battle> was victorious over Abalgamas, king of Parahsum. Zahar, Elam, [G]upin, and [Me]luhha assembled in Pa[rah]sum for battle, but he, (Rimus) captured S[idga'u], general of [Parahsum] (and) [the king(?) of] Elam i[nbetwe]en (the cities of) [Aw]an and [Susa], by the '[Mid]dle Ri[ver]'. [Further], he [h]eaped up over [them] a [burial mo]und i[n] the [are]a of the city. In addition, he tore out the [fo]undation of Parahsum from the land of Elam and (thereby) Rimus, king of the world, rule[d] Elam .... "

== History ==
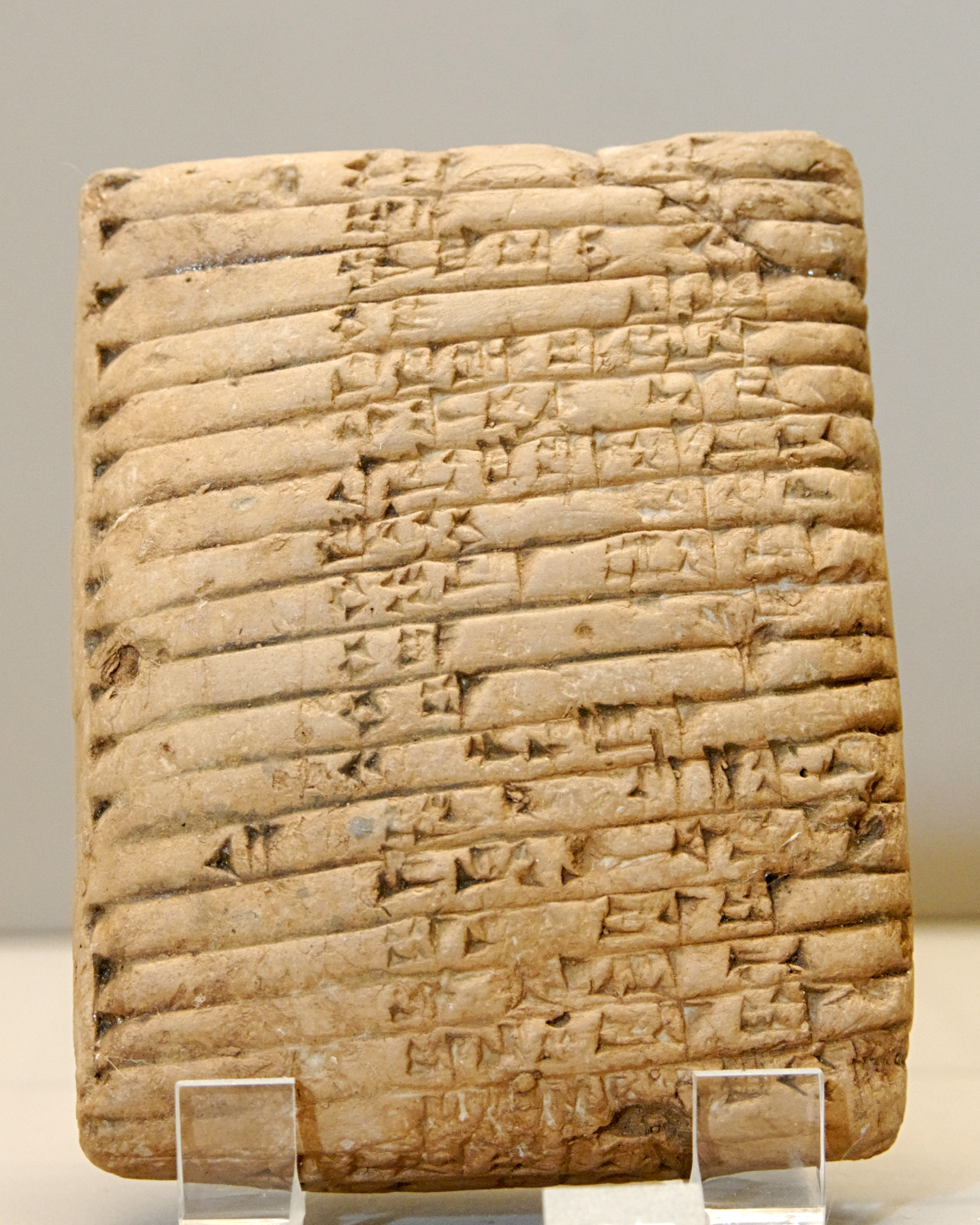
Dynastic list of twelve kings of the Awan dynasty and twelve kings of the Shimashki Dynasty, 1800–1600 BC, Louvre Museum

A dynasty of Elamite rulers was named after the city, the Awan Dynasty. It was founded by a ruler named Peli, and is therefore sometimes called "the dynasty of Peli". According to the Sumerian King List, Awan put an end to the First Dynasty of Ur circa 2450 BC, and three kings of Awan then ruled over the southern regions of Sumer. Unfortunately, the names of the three rulers are broken off in the text. The primary source of this information is a much later king list, recorded on an Old Babylonian period tablet. The tablet has two lists, twelve rulers of Awan and twelve of Šimaški. Doubts have been raised about the list, especially the Awan section. Only two of the rulers on the Awan list are known with certainty from contemporary records Luh-ishan and Puzur-Inshushinak, and a third Khita has been suggested but is not at all certain.

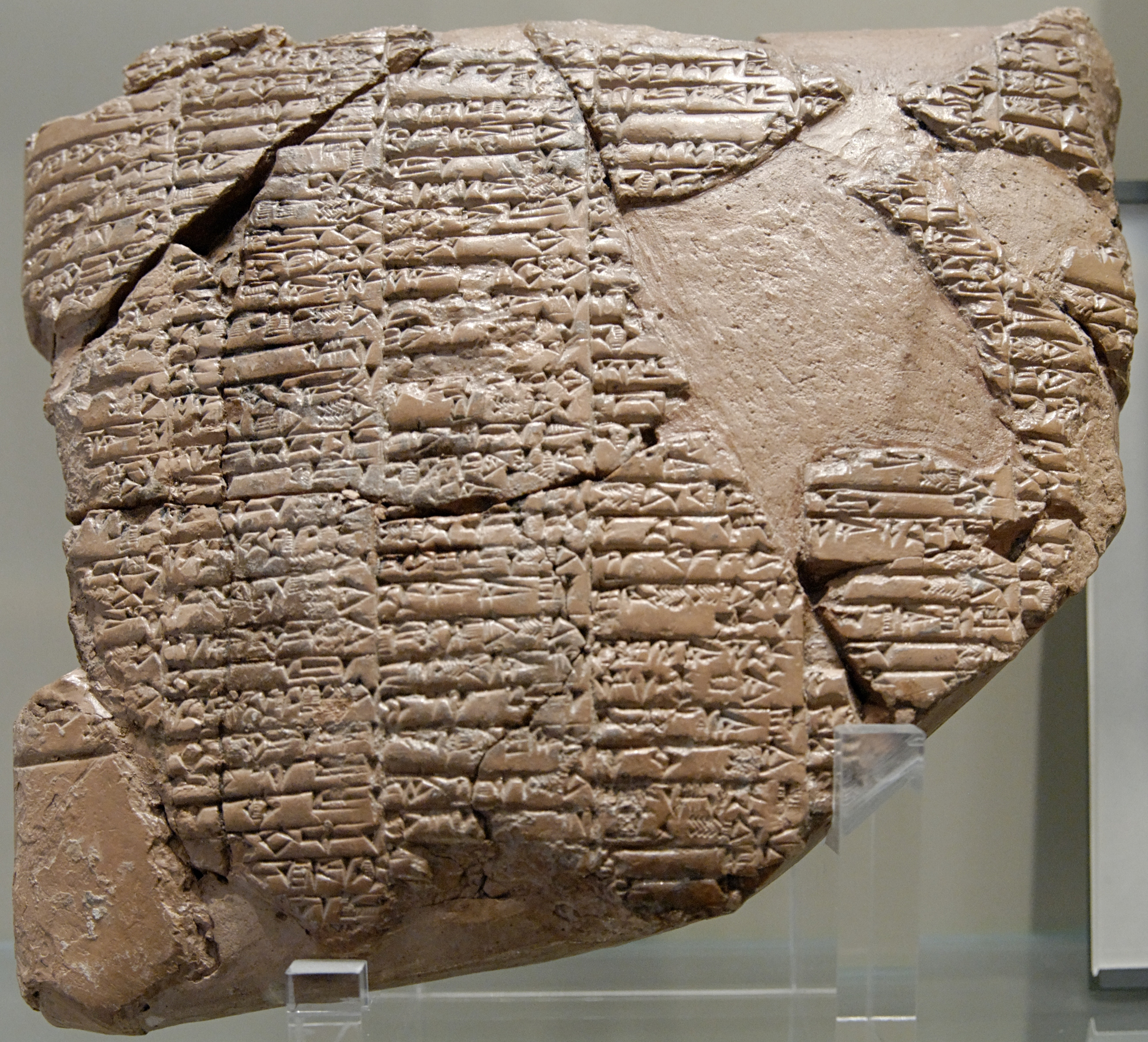
Alliance Naram-Sin Awan Louvre Sb8833

On a monument recording one of his military campaigns, Sargon of Akkad (c. 2334–2279 BC), first ruler of the Akkadian Empire, lists captives and loot acquired including "booty of Awan". An unknown king of Awan (sometimes speculated to be Khita) is recorded as having signed a peace treaty, in Old Elamite language written in an Old Akkadian ductus, with Naram-Sin (not deified in the text), stating: "The enemy of Naram-Sin is my enemy, the friend of Naram-Sin is my friend". Old Elamite is poorly understood (all other texts being very short) as yet making interpretation of the text challenging. The text mentions about twenty gods, mostly Elamite but with a few Sumerian and Akkadian, including Inshushinak, Humban, Nahiti, Simut, and Pinikir. It has been suggested that the formal treaty allowed Naram-Sin to have peace on his eastern borders, so that he could deal more effectively with the threat from Gutium.

Awan wrestled independence from the Akkadians during the reign of Shar-Kali-Sharri. But some time later, the Awan Dynasty ended with the defeat of its last king, Puzur-Inshushinak by Ur-Nammu (c. 2112–2094 BC), followed by the control of the Third Dynasty of Ur over the region.

The last mention of Awan was during the reign of Ibbi-Sin (c. 2028–2004 BC), final ruler of the Ur III Empire, and then only as a geographical area.

== List of rulers ==
Portrait or inscription	Ruler	Approx. date and length of reign (Middle Chronology)	Comments, notes, and references for mentions
Early Dynastic IIIa period (c. 2600 – c. 2500 BC)
Awanite dynasty of Sumer (c. 2600 – c. 2500 BC)
"Then Ur was defeated and the kingship was taken to Awan." — Sumerian King List (SKL)
	Unknown	fl. c. 2600 BC	Historicity uncertain; Same person as Peli (?); Said on the Sumerian King List (SKL) to have held the title of, "King" of not just Awan; but, to have held the "Kingship" over all of Sumer
	...Lu	fl. c. 2580 BC	Historicity uncertain; Same person as Tata (?); Said on the SKL to have held the title of, "King" of not just Awan; but, to have held the "Kingship" over all of Sumer
	Kur-Ishshak 𒆪𒌌	fl. c. 2550 BC (36 years)	Historicity uncertain; Same person as Ukku-Tanhish (?); Said on the SKL to have held the title of, "King" of not just Awan; but, to have held the "Kingship" over all of Sumer
"3 kings; they ruled for 356 years. Then Awan was defeated and the kingship was taken to Kish." — SKL
Portrait or inscription	Ruler	Approx. date and length of reign (MC)	Comments, notes, and references for mentions
Early Dynastic IIIb period (c. 2500 – c. 2350 BC)
Dynasty of Peli (c. 2500 – c. 2015 BC)
	Peli or Feyli	reigned c. 2500 BC	Historicity uncertain; Held the title of, "King of Awan"; Founder of the, "Dynasty of Peli"
	Tata 𒋫𒀀𒅈	r. c. 2450 BC	Historicity uncertain; Held the title of, "King of Awan"; Same person as ...Lu (?)
	Ukku-Tanhish	r. c. 2400 BC	Historicity uncertain; Held the title of, "King of Awan"; Same person as Kur-Ishshak (?)
	Hishutash	fl. c. 2400 – c. 2350 BC	Historicity uncertain; Held the title of, "King of Awan"
	Shushun-Tarana 𒋗𒋗𒌦𒋫𒊏𒈾	fl. c. 2400 – c. 2350 BC	Historicity uncertain; Held the title of, "King of Awan"
	Napi-Ilhush 𒈾𒉿𒅍𒄷𒄷	fl. c. 2400 – c. 2350 BC	Historicity uncertain; Held the title of, "King of Awan"
	Kikku-Siwe-Temti	fl. c. 2400 – c. 2350 BC	Historicity uncertain; Held the title of, "King of Awan"
Portrait or inscription	Ruler	Approx. date and length of reign (MC)	Comments, notes, and references for mentions
Proto-Imperial period (c. 2350 – c. 2334 BC)
	Luh-ishan 𒇻𒄴𒄭𒅖𒊮𒀭	d. c. 2325 BC	Son of Ḫišibrasini; Held the title of, "King of Awan"; temp. of Sargon
Portrait or inscription	Ruler	Approx. date and length of reign (MC)	Comments, notes, and references for mentions
Akkadian period (c. 2334 – c. 2154 BC)
	Sanam-Shimut	fl. c. 2325 BC	temp. of Sargon
	Hishep-Ratep I	fl. c. 2320 BC	Historicity uncertain; Same person as Ḫišibrasini (?); Held the title of, "King of Awan"
	Zinuba	fl. c. 2315 BC	temp. of Sargon
	Helu	fl. c. 2300 BC	Historicity uncertain; Held the title of, "King of Awan"
	Emahsini	fl. c. 2280 BC	temp. of Rimush; Historicity certain; Held the title of, "King of Elam"
	Epirmupi 𒂊𒉆𒈬𒉈	fl. c. 2279 BC	temp. of Rimush (?); Held the titles of "Military Governor of Elam" and "Governor of Susa"
	Enammuna	Uncertain	temp. of Rimush (?)
	Autalummash	fl. c. 2270 BC	temp. of Manishtushu (?); Historicity certain; Held the title of, "King of Kings of Elam"
	Eshpum 𒀹𒅗	fl. c. 2269 BC	temp. of Manishtushu; Held the title of, "Governor of Elam"
	Lamgium	Uncertain	temp. of Manishtushu
	Uba	Uncertain	temp. of Manishtushu
	Ur-Ili-Adad	Uncertain	temp. of Manishtushu
	Khita 𒄭𒋫𒀀	fl. c. 2250 BC	temp. of Naram-Suen; Held the title of, "King of Awan"
	Ili-ishmani 𒉌𒉌𒅖𒈠𒉌	fl. c. 2200 BC	temp. of Shar-Kali-Sharri; Held the titles of "Military Governor of Elam" and "Governor of Susa"
	Hita'a 𒄭𒋫𒀀	Uncertain	Same person as Khita (?); temp. of Shar-Kali-Sharri; Held the title of, "King of Awan"
	Shinpi-hish-huk	Uncertain	Brother of Khita (?); temp. of Shar-Kali-Sharri
Portrait or inscription	Ruler	Approx. date and length of reign (MC)	Comments, notes, and references for mentions
Gutian period (c. 2154 – c. 2112 BC)
	Puzur-Inshushinak 𒅤𒊭𒀭𒈹𒂞	r. c. 2150 BC	Son of Shinpi-hish-huk; temp. of Gudea; Held the titles of "Military Governor of Elam", "Governor of Susa", and, "King of Awan"

== See also ==
- Cities of the ancient Near East
- List of Mesopotamian dynasties
