= Awan =

Awan may refer to:

- Awan (surname), including a list of people with the name
- Awana, also known as Awan is a clan of Gujjars in South Asia
- Awan (tribe), a social group of Pakistan
- Awan dynasty, an Elamite dynasty of Iran
- Awan languages, spoken in South America

== Places ==
- Awan (ancient city), a city-state in Elam in the 3rd millennium BCE
- Awan (region), a town in Guna district, Madhya Pradesh, India
- Awan, Bhulath, a village in Kapurthala district, Punjab, India
- Awan Town, a town and union council in Lahore, Punjab, Pakistan
- Awans, a Belgian municipality in the Walloon province of Liège

== Other uses ==
- Awan (Kuwait), a newspaper
- Awan (religious figure), the wife and sister of Cain
