= Kur-Ishshak =

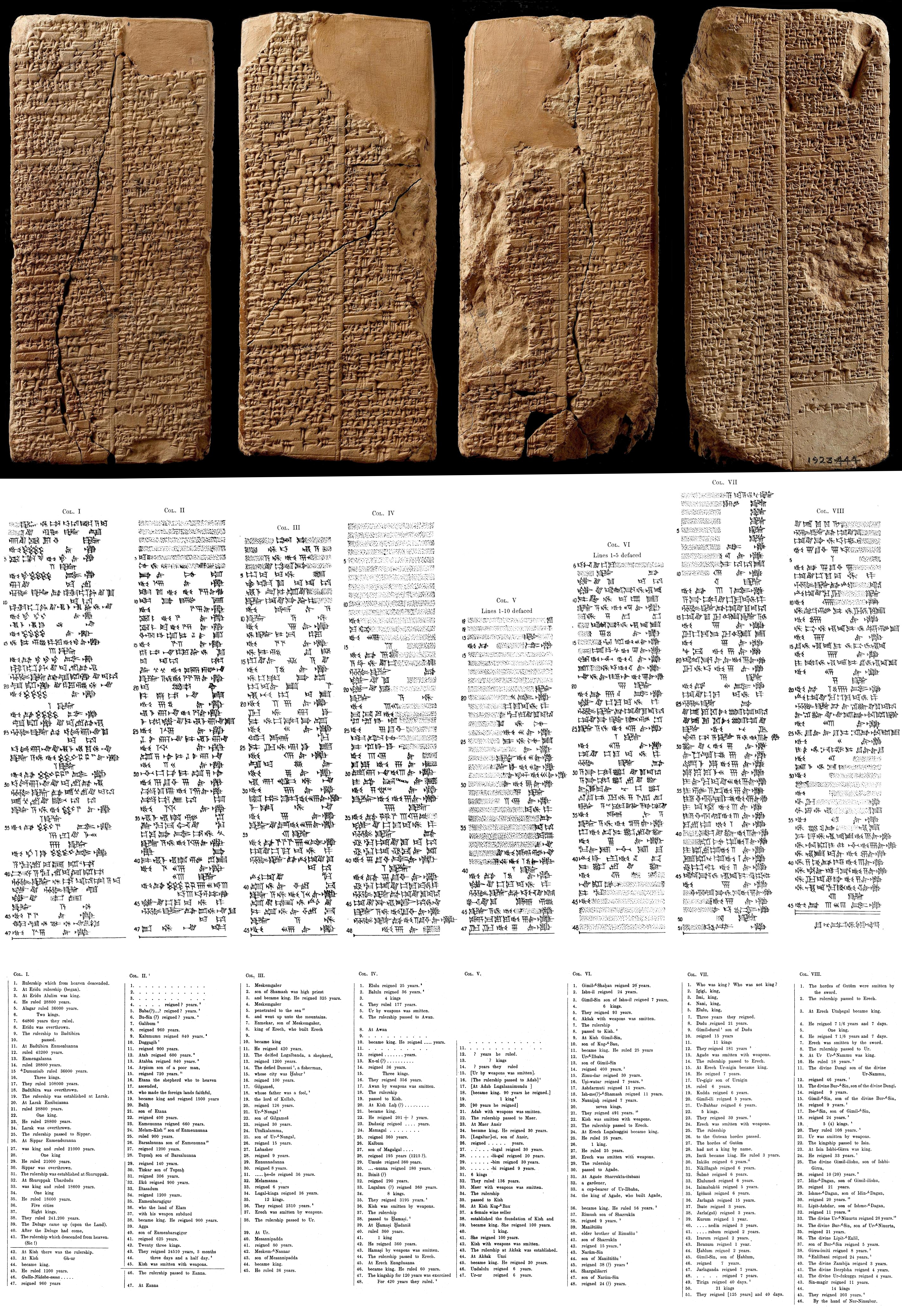
- The Weld-Blundell Prism (W-B 444) copy of the Sumerian King List (SKL).

King of Sumer
- Reign: fl. c. 2600 – c. 2400 BC
- Predecessor: ...Lu (?)
- Successor: Susuda (?)

King of Elam
- Reign: fl. c. 2600 – c. 2400 BC
- Predecessor: ...Lu (?)
- Successor: Hishutash (?)

King of Awan
- Reign: fl. c. 2600 – c. 2400 BC
- Predecessor: ...Lu (?)
- Successor: Hishutash (?)
- Born: Awan
Era name and dates
- First Paleo-Elamite period: c. 2400 – c. 2015 BC
- Sumerian: 𒆪𒌌
- Dynasty: Awan dynasty
- Religion: Elamite religion

Kur-Ishshak (Note: Sumerian: 𒆪𒌌, romanized: ku-ul-x; transliterated: ku.ul.x; anglicized: Ku-u [l- . . . ]; also: Kul[...]; alternatively: Kur-Ishshak (Sjöberg, Leichty & Tinney 2024)) was the third king of the Awan dynasty and is said on the Sumerian King List (SKL) to have been the third Elamite king to exercise the kingship of Awan over all of Sumer. He probably reigned sometime in the first Paleo-Elamite period (c. 2400 – c. 2015 BC). Additionally; he could have possibly been the same third king (Ukku-Tanhish) from Awan said on the Susanian Dynastic List to exercise the kingship over all of Elam. According to the SKL: he was preceded by ...Lu (possibly Tata named only on the Susanian Dynastic List) and succeeded by Susuda of Kish (named only on the SKL). However, the Susanian Dynastic List states that the third king was succeeded by Hishutash.

== See also ==
- Mesopotamia
- Ancient Near East

| Preceded by...Lu (?) | King of Sumer fl. c. 2600 – c. 2400 BC | Succeeded by Susuda (?) |
| Preceded by...Lu (?) | King of Elam fl. c. 2600 – c. 2400 BC | Succeeded by Hishutash (?) |
| Preceded by...Lu (?) | King of Awan fl. c. 2600 – c. 2400 BC | Succeeded by Hishutash (?) |
