= Avan =

Avan may refer to:

== Films ==
- Aah (film), a 1953 Hindi-language film dubbed into Tamil as Avan
- Avan (1985 film), a 1985 Tamil-language film
- Avan (2010 film), a 2010 Malayalam-language film

== Places ==
- Avan, Armenia, a village in Armenia
- Avan District, a district in Yerevan, Armenia
- Avan, East Azerbaijan, a village in Iran
- Avan, Qazvin, a village in Iran
- Avan, Sweden
- Avan, Russia, a former village in Providensky District, Chukotka Autonomous Okrug

== Other uses ==
- Aban or Avan, a Zoroastrian term for water
- Avan Yuzbashi (died 1735), Armenian military leader in Karabagh
- Avan-khan (died 1744), ruler of Dizak
- Fatih Avan (born 1989), Turkish javelin thrower
- Avan Jogia (born 1992), Canadian actor

== See also ==
- Awan (disambiguation)
- Avon (disambiguation)
