= Peli (king of Awan) =

Elamite king

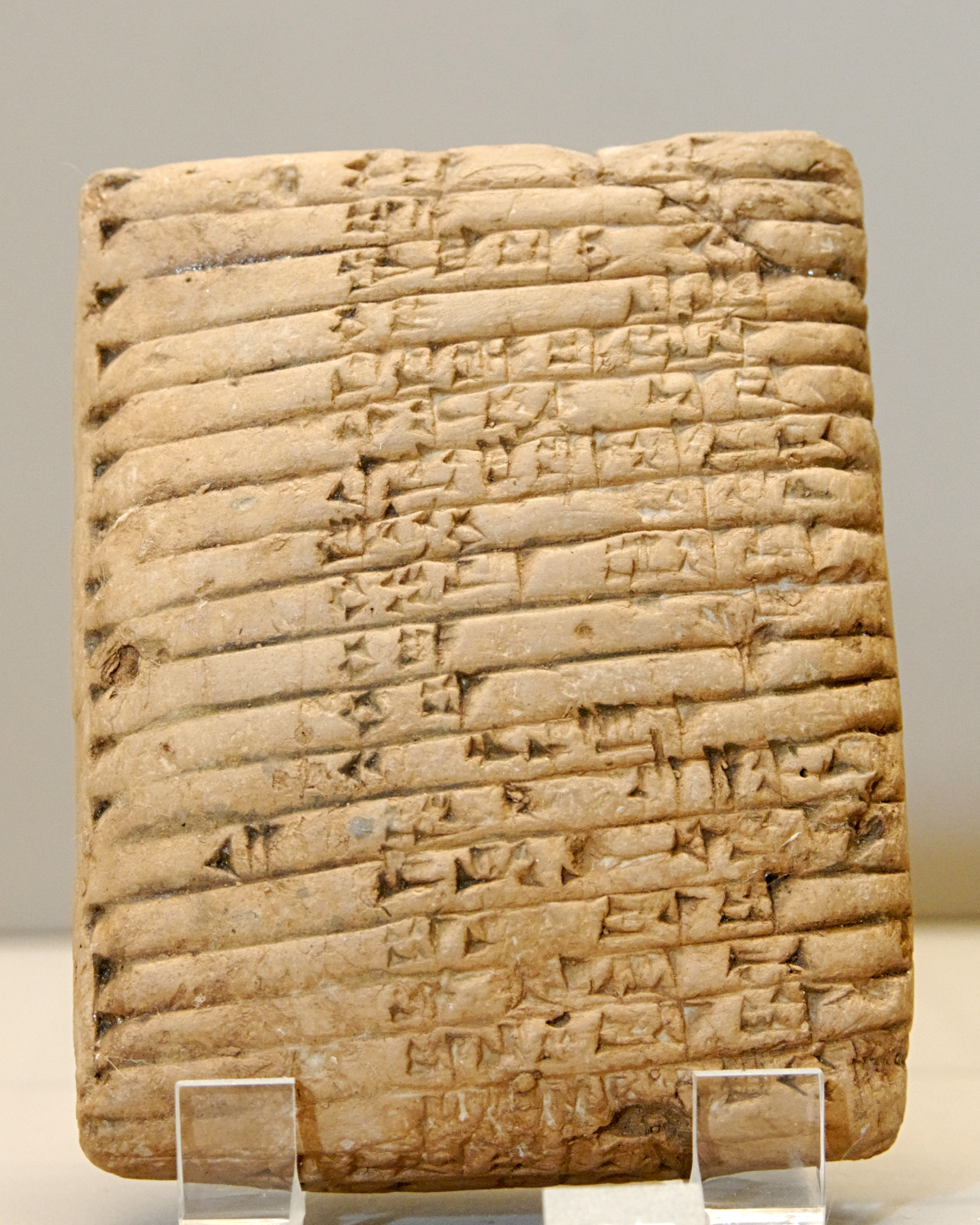
- The Susanian Dynastic List—a regnal list dated to c. 1800 – c. 1600 BC and provenanced at Susa. Its current location is the Louvre Museum, Sb 17729. It names twelve kings for Awan and another twelve for Shimashki.

King of Sumer
- Predecessor: Balulu (?)
- Successor: ...Lu (?)
- Reign: fl. c. 2600 – c. 2400 BC

King of Elam
- Reign: fl. c. 2600 – c. 2400 BC
- Predecessor: Kur-Ishshak (?)
- Successor: Tata (?)

King of Awan
- Reign: fl. c. 2600 – c. 2400 BC
- Predecessor: Kur-Ishshak (?)
- Successor: Tata (?)
- Born: Awan
Era name and dates
- First Paleo-Elamite period: c. 2400 – c. 2015 BC
- Dynasty: Awan dynasty
- Religion: Elamite religion

Peli (also written as: Pi-e(?)-li(?), Pieli, Peyli, and/or Feyli) was the eponymous founding king of the dynasty of Peli and may have been the first to exercise the kingship of Awan over all of Elam. He probably reigned sometime in the first Paleo-Elamite period (c. 2400 – c. 2015 BC). Additionally; he could have possibly been the same first king from Awan said on the Sumerian King List (SKL) to exercise the kingship over all of Sumer. According to the SKL: he was preceded by Balulu of Ur and succeeded by Kur-Ishshak. However, the Susanian Dynastic List states that he was succeeded by Tata.

== See also ==
- Mesopotamia
- Ancient Near East

Preceded by Balulu (?)	King of Sumer fl. c. 2600 – c. 2400 BC	Succeeded by...Lu (?)
Preceded by Kur-Ishshak (?)	King of Elam fl. c. 2600 – c. 2400 BC	Succeeded by Tata (?)
Preceded by Kur-Ishshak (?)	King of Awan fl. c. 2600 – c. 2400 BC	Succeeded by Tata (?)
