= Napi-Ilhush =

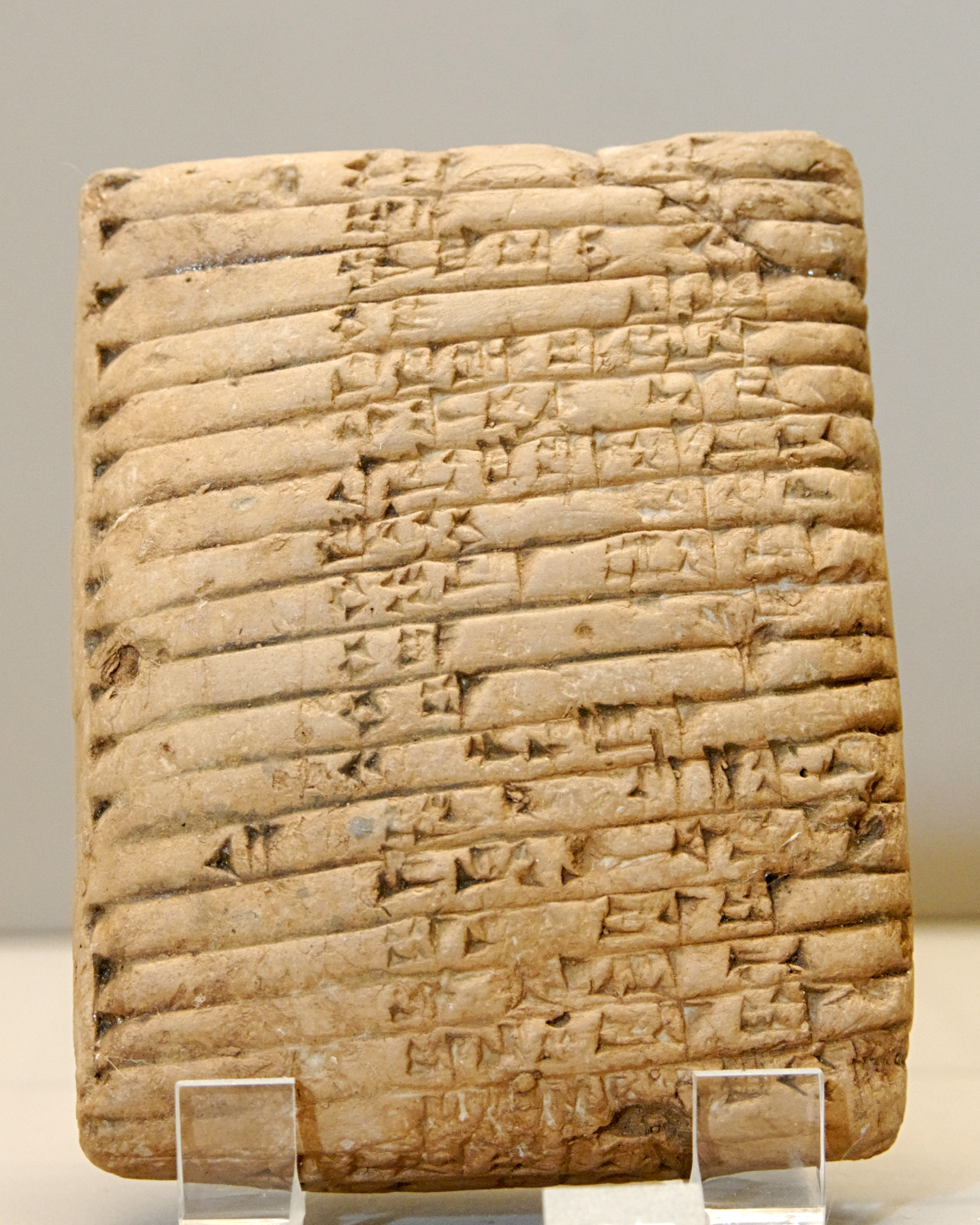
- The Susanian Dynastic List—a regnal list dated to c. 1800 – c. 1600 BC and provenanced at Susa. Its current location is the Louvre Museum, Sb 17729. It names twelve kings for Awan and another twelve for Shimashki.

King of Elam
- Reign: fl. c. 2400 – c. 2350 BC
- Predecessor: Shushun-Tarana
- Successor: Kikku-Siwe-Temti

King of Awan
- Reign: fl. c. 2400 – c. 2350 BC
- Predecessor: Shushun-Tarana
- Successor: Kikku-Siwe-Temti
- Born: Awan
Era name and dates
- First Paleo-Elamite period: c. 2400 – c. 2015 BC
- Dynasty: Awan dynasty
- Religion: Elamite religion

Napi-Ilhush (also written as: Na-pi-il-ḥu-uš, Na-?-pilhuš, Napil-huš, Napil-Khush, and/or Napilhush) was the sixth king of the Awan dynasty and is said on the Susanian Dynastic List to have been the sixth king to exercise the kingship of Awan over all of Elam. He probably reigned sometime in the first Paleo-Elamite period (c. 2400 – c. 2015 BC). According to the Susanian Dynastic List: he was preceded by Shushun-Tarana and succeeded by Kikku-Siwe-Temti.

== See also ==
- Mesopotamia
- Ancient Near East

Preceded by Shushun-Tarana	King of Elam fl. c. 2400 – c. 2350 BC	Succeeded by Kikku-Siwe-Temti
Preceded by Shushun-Tarana	King of Awan fl. c. 2400 – c. 2350 BC	Succeeded by Kikku-Siwe-Temti
