= Ukku-Tanhish =

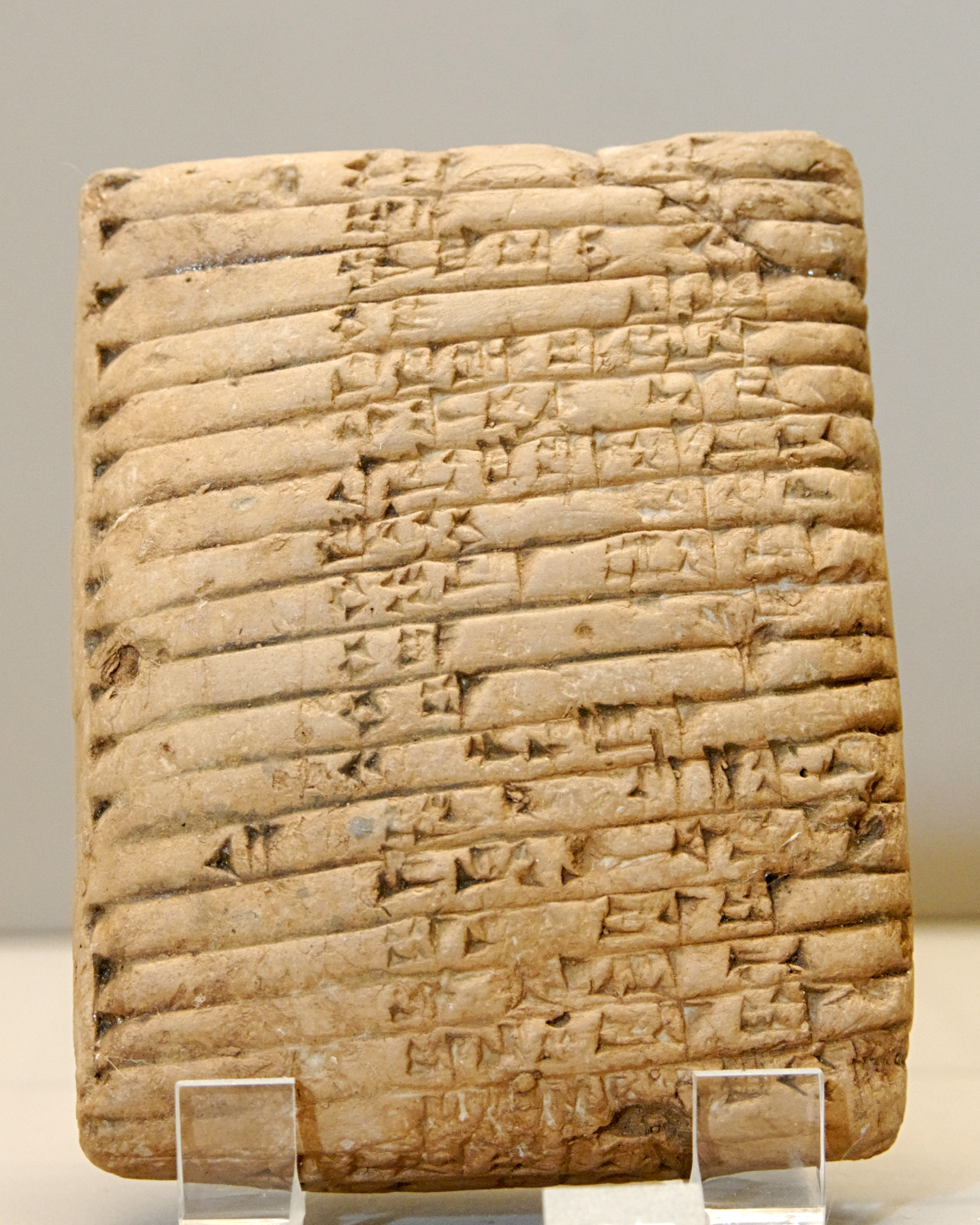
- The Susanian Dynastic List—a regnal list dated to c. 1800 – c. 1600 BC and provenanced at Susa. Its current location is the Louvre Museum, Sb 17729. It names twelve kings for Awan and another twelve for Shimashki.

King of Sumer
- Reign: fl. c. 2600 – c. 2400 BC
- Predecessor: ...Lu (?)
- Successor: Susuda (?)

King of Elam
- Reign: fl. c. 2600 – c. 2400 BC
- Predecessor: Tata (?)
- Successor: Hishutash (?)

King of Awan
- Reign: fl. c. 2600 – c. 2400 BC
- Predecessor: Tata (?)
- Successor: Hishutash (?)
- Born: Awan
Era name and dates
- First Paleo-Elamite period: c. 2400 – c. 2015 BC
- Dynasty: Awan dynasty
- Religion: Elamite religion

Ukku-Tanhish (also written as: Uk-ku ta-ḥi-eš, Ukkutahieš, Ukku-tahiš, Ukku-Takhesh, and/or Ukkutahesh) was the third king of the Awan dynasty and may have been the third to exercise the kingship of Awan over all of Elam. He probably reigned sometime in the first Paleo-Elamite period (c. 2400 – c. 2015 BC). Additionally; he could have possibly been the same third king from Awan said on the Sumerian King List (SKL) to exercise the kingship over all of Sumer. According to the SKL: he was preceded by ...Lu and succeeded by Susuda of Kish. However, the Susanian Dynastic List states that he was succeeded by Hishutash.

== See also ==
- Mesopotamia
- Ancient Near East

Preceded by...Lu (?)	King of Sumer fl. c. 2600 – c. 2400 BC	Succeeded by Susuda (?)
Preceded by Tata (?)	King of Elam fl. c. 2600 – c. 2400 BC	Succeeded by Hishutash (?)
Preceded by Tata (?)	King of Awan fl. c. 2600 – c. 2400 BC	Succeeded by Hishutash (?)
