= Shushun-Tarana =

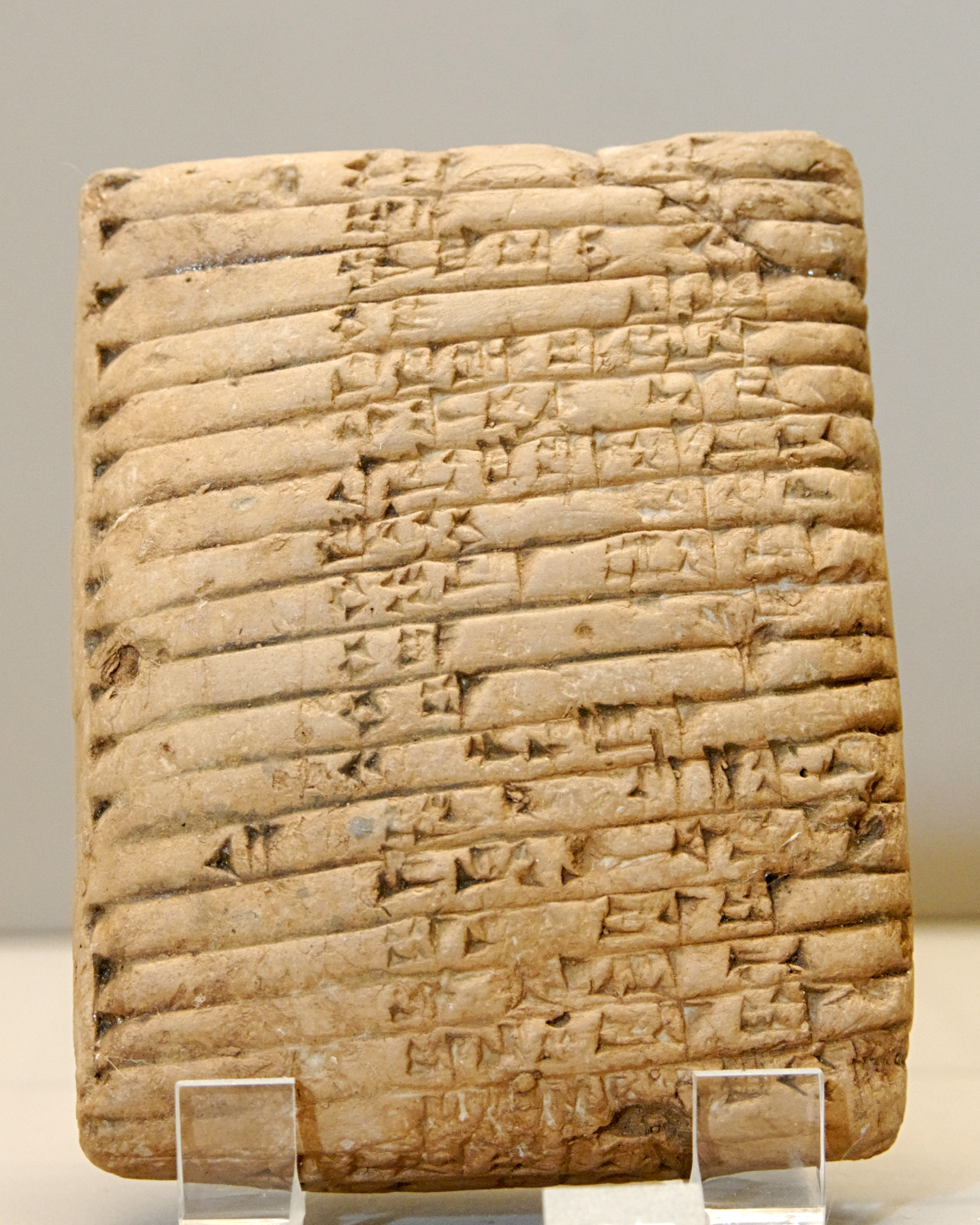
- The Susanian Dynastic List—a regnal list dated to c. 1800 – c. 1600 BC and provenanced at Susa. Its current location is the Louvre Museum, Sb 17729. It names twelve kings for Awan and another twelve for Shimashki.

King of Elam
- Reign: fl. c. 2400 – c. 2350 BC
- Predecessor: Hishutash
- Successor: Napi-Ilhush

King of Awan
- Reign: fl. c. 2400 – c. 2350 BC
- Predecessor: Hishutash
- Successor: Napi-Ilhush
- Born: Awan
Era name and dates
- First Paleo-Elamite period: c. 2400 – c. 2015 BC
- Dynasty: Awan dynasty
- Religion: Elamite religion

Shushun-Tarana (also written as: Šu-šu-un ta-ra-na, Šušun-tarana, Šušuntarana, and/or Shushuntarana) was the fifth king of the Awan dynasty and is said on the Susanian Dynastic List to have been the fifth king to exercise the kingship of Awan over all of Elam. He probably reigned sometime in the first Paleo-Elamite period (c. 2400 – c. 2015 BC). According to the Susanian Dynastic List: he was preceded by Hishutash and succeeded by Napi-Ilhush.

== See also ==
- Mesopotamia
- Ancient Near East

Preceded by Hishutash	King of Elam fl. c. 2400 – c. 2350 BC	Succeeded by Napi-Ilhush
Preceded by Hishutash	King of Awan fl. c. 2400 – c. 2350 BC	Succeeded by Napi-Ilhush
