= ...Lu =

Second king of the Awan dynasty

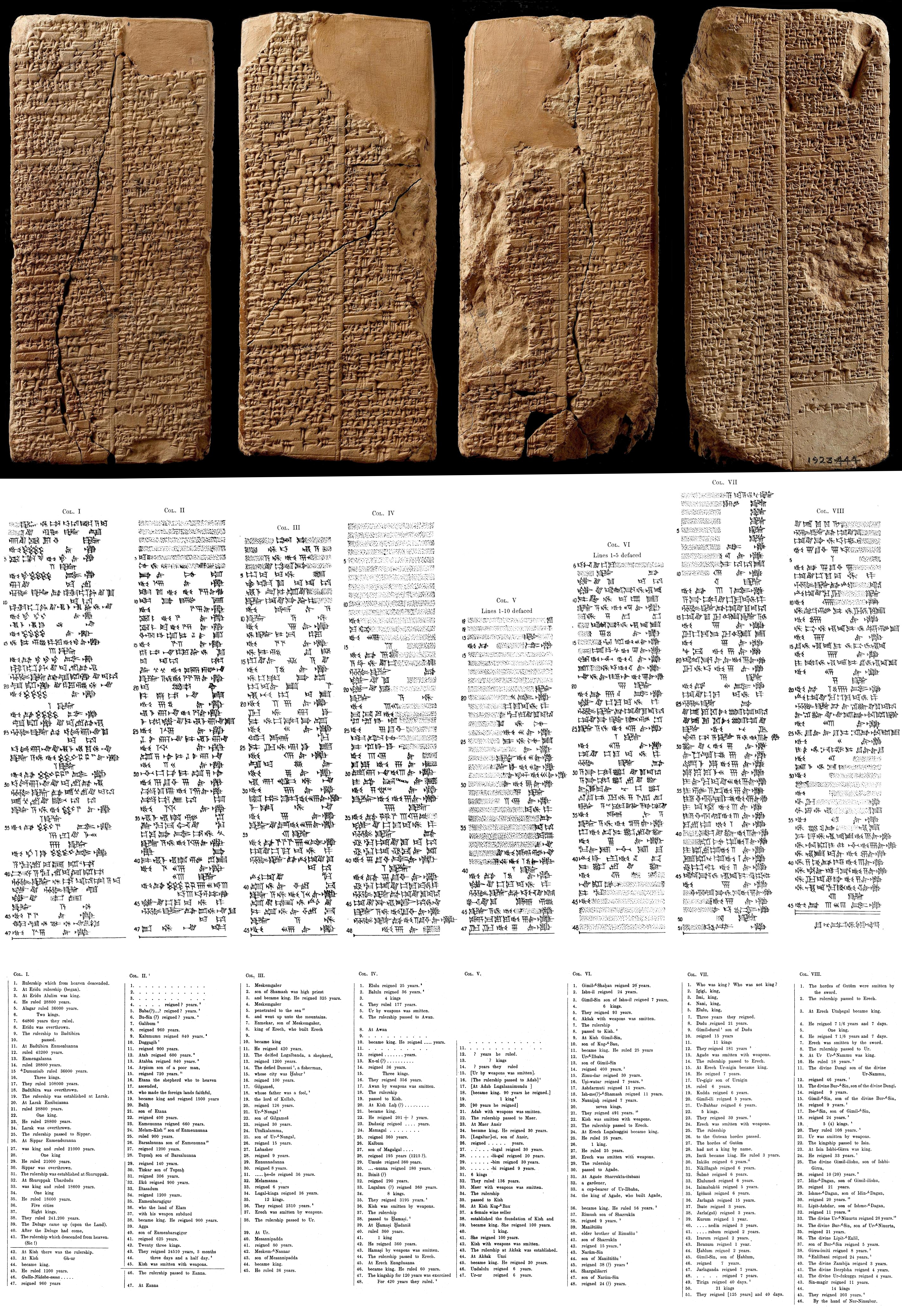
- The Weld-Blundell Prism (W-B 444) copy of the Sumerian King List (SKL).

King of Sumer
- Reign: fl. c. 2600 – c. 2400 BC
- Predecessor: Peli (?)
- Successor: Kur-Ishshak (?)

King of Elam
- Reign: fl. c. 2600 – c. 2400 BC
- Predecessor: Peli (?)
- Successor: Kur-Ishshak (?)

King of Awan
- Reign: fl. c. 2600 – c. 2400 BC
- Predecessor: Peli (?)
- Successor: Kur-Ishshak (?)
- Born: Awan
Era name and dates
- First Paleo-Elamite period: c. 2400 – c. 2015 BC
- Dynasty: Awan dynasty
- Religion: Elamite religion

...Lu was the second king of the Awan dynasty and is said on the Sumerian King List (SKL) to have been the second Elamite king to exercise the kingship of Awan over all of Sumer. He probably reigned sometime in the first Paleo-Elamite period (c. 2400 – c. 2015 BC). Additionally; he could have possibly been the same second king (Tata) from Awan said on the Susanian Dynastic List to exercise the kingship over all of Elam. According to the SKL: he was preceded by an unnamed king (possibly Peli named only on the Susanian Dynastic List) and succeeded by Kur-Ishshak (named only on the SKL). However, the Susanian Dynastic List states that the second king, Ta-a-ar, was succeeded by Ukku-Tanhish.

== See also ==
- Ancient Near East
- Mesopotamia

== Notes ==
Preceded by Peli (?)	King of Sumer fl. c. 2600 – c. 2400 BC	Succeeded by Kur-Ishshak (?)
Preceded by Peli (?)	King of Elam fl. c. 2600 – c. 2400 BC	Succeeded by Kur-Ishshak (?)
Preceded by Peli (?)	King of Awan fl. c. 2600 – c. 2400 BC	Succeeded by Kur-Ishshak (?)
