= Awan (surname) =

Awan is a surname, and may refer to:

- Malik Shakeel Awan (born 1966), Pakistani politician
- Ahmad Nadeem Qasmi (1916–2006), Pakistani writer and critic
- Ahmed Ali Awan, convicted of the murder of Ross Parker
- Akil N. Awan, British academic
- Ameer Muhammad Akram Awan (1934–2017), Pakistani scholar
- Babar Awan (born 1958), Pakistani statesman
- Dildar Awan (1928–2000), Pakistani cricketer
- Ameer Muhammad Akram Awan (1934–2017), Pakistani religious leader
- Firdous Ashiq Awan (born 1970), Pakistani physician and politician
- Ghulam Farooq Awan (born 1961), Pakistani lawyer
- Hanif Awan, Pakistani politician
- Imran Awan, American technology aide
- Imran Awan (cricketer) (born 1979), Pakistani born American cricketer
- Malik Munawar Khan Awan (1917–1981), Pakistani officer
- Malik Shakir Bashir Awan (born 1965), Pakistani politician
- Madut Kon Awan, South Sudanese politician
- Malik Shakeel Awan (born 1966), Pakistani politician
- Muhammad Huzair Awan (born 2006), Pakistani Information Technology (IT) prodigy
- Muhammad Safdar Awan (born 1964), Pakistani politician
- Paul Malong Awan, South Sudanese politician
- Samina Awan (born 1985), British actress
