= Feyli =

Feyli may refer to:

- Feyli Kurds
- Feyli Lurs
- Peli (king of Awan), an Elamite king in ancient Iran
