= Awan dynasty =

First dynasty of Elam ca. 2700–2150 BC

Awan dynasty 𒈗 𒂊 𒉈 𒀀 𒉿 𒀭 𒆠 (Sumerian) Dynasty of Peli
- Dynasty
- A map of the Near East detailing the geopolitical situation in the region during the Awan dynasty c. 2600 BC occupied by various contemporaneous archaeological cultures and/or civilizations such as those of the: Minoans Elamites Egyptians Sumerians Hurrians Assyrians A clickable map of the present-day Islamic Republic of Iran detailing the locations of various ancient, archaeological sites, settlements, hamlets, villages, towns, and/or cities (and the approximated locations of six lost cities: Akkad, Akshak, Urua, Hidali, Hurti, and Kimash; also, the two lost capital cities of the Elamite Empire: Awan and Shimashki) that may have been visited, interacted and traded with, invaded, conquered, destroyed, occupied, colonized by and/or otherwise within the Elamites’ sphere of influence at some point temp. the dynasty of Awan.
- Parent family: Early Elamite kings
- Country: Elam
- Current region: Western Iran
- Earlier spellings: lugal-e-ne a-wa-an^{ki}
- Etymology: Kings of Awan
- Origin: Asia
- Founded: c. 2400 BC (c. 2600 BC)
- Founder: Peli (fl. c. 2550 – c. 2400 BC); (Unknown, (fl. c. 2600 – c. 2450 BC)
- Final ruler: Puzur-Inshushinak (r. c. 2100 BC)
- Final head: Luh-ishan (d. c. 2325 BC)
- Historic seat: Awan
- Titles: List: King of Awan; Military Governor of Elam; Governor of Susa; King of Sumer; King of Elam; King of Kings of Elam
- Connected families: Sukkalmah dynasty
- Traditions: Elamite religion
- Estate: Godin Tepe
- Dissolution: c. 2015 BC
- Deposition: c. 2450 BC
- Cadet branches: Shimashki dynasty
- The Elamites remained a major source of tension for the Sumerians, Akkadians, Amorites, Assyrians, Babylonians, and Kassites millennia after the supposed victory of the Awan dynasty over the first dynasty of Ur c. 2600 – c. 2340 BC as described on the Sumerian King List (SKL).

The Awan dynasty (Note: Sumerian: 𒈗 𒂊 𒉈 𒀀 𒉿 𒀭 𒆠, romanized: Awan, lit. 'Kings of Awan' ; transliterated: lugal-e-ne a-wa-an^{ki}) was the first dynasty of Elam of which very little of anything is known today—appearing at the dawn of recorded history. The dynasty corresponds to the early part of the first Paleo-Elamite period (dated to c. 2400 – c. 2015 BC); additionally, succeeded by the Shimashki (c. 2200 – c. 1980 BC) and Sukkalmah dynasties (c. 1980 – c. 1450 BC). The Elamites were likely major rivals of neighboring Sumer from remotest antiquity—they were said to have been defeated by Enmebaragesi of Kish c. 2750 BC—who is the earliest archaeologically attested king named on the Sumerian King List (SKL); moreover, by a later monarch, Eannatum of Lagash c. 2450 BC. Awan was a city-state or possibly a region of Elam whose precise location is not certain; but, it has been variously conjectured to have been within the: Ilam and/or Fars provinces of what is today known as the Islamic Republic of Iran, to the north of Susa (in south Luristan), close to Dezful (in Khuzestan), or Godin Tepe (in the Kermanshah province).

== History ==
=== Early Dynastic period (c. 2900 – c. 2350 BC) ===
According to the Sumerian King List, a dynasty from Awan exerted hegemony in Sumer after defeating the First Dynasty of Ur, probably in the 25th century BC. It mentions three Awan kings, who supposedly reigned for a total of 356 years. Their names have not survived on the extant copies, apart from the partial names of the second and third kings, "...Lu" and Ku-ul...", who it says ruled for 36 years. This information is not considered reliable, but it does suggest that Awan had political importance in the 3rd millennium BC.

A royal list found at Susa gives 12 names of the kings in the Awan dynasty. The twelve kings of Awan given in the list are: Pieli, Tari/ip, Ukkutahieš, Hišur, Šušuntarana, Na-?-pilhuš, Kikkutanteimti, Luhhiššan, Hišepratep, Hielu?, Hita-Idaddu-napir, Puzur-Inšušinak. The twelve kings of the Shimashki Dynasty are: Girnamme, Tazitta, Ebarti, Tazitta, Lu?-x-luuhhan, Kindattu, Idaddu, Tan-Ruhurater, Ebarti, Idaddu, Idaddu-Temti.

As there are very few other sources for this period, most of these names are not certain. Little more of these kings' reigns is known, but Elam seems to have kept up a heavy trade with the Sumerian city-states during this time, importing mainly foods, and exporting cattle, wool, slaves and silver, among other things. A text of the time refers to a shipment of tin to the governor of the Elamite city of Urua, which was committed to work the material and return it in the form of bronze – perhaps indicating a technological edge enjoyed by the Elamites over the Sumerians.

It is also known that the Awan kings carried out incursions in Mesopotamia, where they ran up against the most powerful city-states of this period, Kish and Lagash. One such incident is recorded in a tablet addressed to Enetarzi, a minor ruler or governor of Lagash, testifying that a party of 600 Elamites had been intercepted and defeated while attempting to abscond from the port with plunder.

=== Akkadian period (c. 2350 – c. 2154 BC) ===
Events become a little clearer at the time of the Akkadian Empire (c. 2300 BC), when historical texts tell of campaigns carried out by the kings of Akkad on the Iranian plateau. Sargon of Akkad boasted of defeating a "Luh-ishan king of Elam, son of Hishiprashini", and mentions plunder seized from Awan, among other places. Luhi-ishan is the eighth king on the Awan king list, while his father's name "Hishiprashini" is a variant of that of the ninth listed king, Hishepratep – indicating either a different individual, or if the same, that the order of kings on the Awan king list has been jumbled.

Sargon's son and successor, Rimush, is said to have conquered Elam, defeating its king who is named as Emahsini. Emahsini's name does not appear on the Awan king list, but the Rimush inscriptions claim that the combined forces of Elam and Warahshe, led by General Sidgau, were defeated at a battle "on the middle river between Awan and Susa". Scholars have adduced a number of such clues that Awan and Susa were probably adjoining territories.

With these defeats, the low-lying, westerly parts of Elam became a vassal of Akkad, centred at Susa. This is confirmed by a document of great historical value, a peace treaty signed between Naram-Sin of Akkad and an unnamed king or governor of Awan, probably Khita or Helu. It is the oldest document written in Elamite cuneiform that has been found.

Although Awan was defeated, the Elamites were able to avoid total assimilation. The capital of Anshan, located in a steep and mountainous area, was never reached by Akkad. The Elamites remained a major source of tension, that would contribute to destabilizing the Akkadian state, until it finally collapsed under Gutian pressure.

=== Gutian period (c. 2154 – c. 2112 BC) ===
When the Akkadian empire started to break down around 2240 BC, it was Kutik-Inshushinak (or Puzur-Inshushinak), the governor of Susa on behalf of Akkad, who liberated Awan and Elam, ascending to the throne.

By this time, Susa had started to gain influence in Elam (later, Elam would be called Susiana), and the city began to be filled with temples and monuments. Kutik-Inshushinak next defeated Kimash and Hurtum (neighboring towns rebelling against him), destroying 70 cities in a day. Next he established his position as king, defeating all his rivals and taking Anshan, the capital. Not content with this, he launched a campaign of devastation throughout northern Sumer, seizing such important cities as Eshnunna. When he finally conquered Akkad he was declared king of the four quarters, owner of the known world. Later, Ur-Nammu of Ur, founder of the 3rd dynasty of Ur defeated Elam, ending the dynasty of Awan.

Kutik-Inshushinak's work was not only as a conqueror; he created Elam's organization and the administrative structure. He extended the temple of Inshushinak, where he erected a statue of her.

After his defeat, the Awan dynasty disappears from history, probably cut down by the Guti or Lullubi tribes that then sowed disorder in Mesopotamia and the Zagros, and Elam was left in the hands of the Shimashki dynasty.

The toponym "Awan" only occurs once more following the reign of Kutik-Inshushinak, in a year-name of Ibbi-Sin of Ur. The name Anshan, on the other hand, which only occurs once before this time (in an inscription of Manishtushu), becomes increasingly more commonplace beginning with king Gudea of Lagash, who claimed to have conquered it around the same time. It has accordingly been conjectured that Anshan not only replaced Awan as one of the major divisions of Elam, but that it also included the same territory.

== List of rulers ==
The following list should not be considered complete:

| # | Depiction | Ruler | Succession | Epithet | Approx. dates | Notes |
|---|---|---|---|---|---|---|
Early Dynastic IIIa period (c. 2600 – c. 2500 BC)
Awanite dynasty of Sumer (c. 2600 – c. 2500 BC)
"Then Ur was defeated and the kingship was taken to Awan." — Sumerian King List (SKL)
| 1st | | Unknown | Same person as Peli (?) | | Uncertain, fl. c. 2600 BC | Historicity uncertain; Said on the Sumerian King List (SKL) to have held the title of, "King" of not just Awan; but, to have held the "Kingship" over all of Sumer |
| 2nd | | ...Lu | Same person as Tata (?) | | Uncertain, fl. c. 2580 BC | Historicity uncertain; Said on the SKL to have held the title of, "King" of not just Awan; but, to have held the "Kingship" over all of Sumer |
| 3rd | | Kur-Ishshak 𒆪𒌌 | Same person as Ukku-Tanhish (?) | | Uncertain, fl. c. 2550 BC (36 years) | Historicity uncertain; Said on the SKL to have held the title of, "King" of not just Awan; but, to have held the "Kingship" over all of Sumer |
"3 kings; they ruled for 356 years. Then Awan was defeated and the kingship was taken to Kish." — SKL
| # | Depiction | Ruler | Succession | Epithet | Approx. dates | Notes |
Early Dynastic IIIb period (c. 2500 – c. 2350 BC)
Dynasty of Peli (c. 2500 – c. 2015 BC)
| 1st | | Peli or Feyli | Founder | | Uncertain, fl. c. 2500 BC | Historicity uncertain; Held the title of, "King of Awan"; Founder of the, "Dynasty of Peli" |
| 2nd | | Tata 𒋫𒀀𒅈 | Same person as ...Lu (?) | | Uncertain, fl. c. 2450 BC | Historicity uncertain; Held the title of, "King of Awan" |
| 3rd | | Ukku-Tanhish | Same person as Kur-Ishshak (?) | | Uncertain, fl. c. 2430 BC | Historicity uncertain; Held the title of, "King of Awan" |
| 4th | | Hishutash | | | Uncertain, fl. c. 2400 BC | Historicity uncertain; Held the title of, "King of Awan" |
| 5th | | Shushun-Tarana 𒋗𒋗𒌦𒋫𒊏𒈾 | | | Uncertain, fl. c. 2380 BC | Historicity uncertain; Held the title of, "King of Awan" |
| 6th | | Napi-Ilhush 𒈾𒉿𒅍𒄷𒄷 | | | Uncertain, fl. c. 2360 BC | Historicity uncertain; Held the title of, "King of Awan" |
| 7th | | Kikku-Siwe-Temti | | | Uncertain, fl. c. 2350 BC | Historicity uncertain; Held the title of, "King of Awan" |
| # | Depiction | Ruler | Succession | Epithet | Approx. dates | Notes |
Proto-Imperial period (c. 2350 – c. 2334 BC)
| 8th | | Luh-ishan 𒇻𒄴𒄭𒅖𒊮𒀭 | Son of Ḫišibrasini | | Uncertain, d. c. 2325 BC | Held the title of, "King of Awan"; temp. of Sargon |
| # | Depiction | Ruler | Succession | Epithet | Approx. dates | Notes |
Akkadian period (c. 2334 – c. 2154 BC)
| 9th | | Hishep-Ratep I | Same person as Ḫišibrasini (?) | | Uncertain, fl. c. 2320 BC | Historicity uncertain; Held the title of, "King of Awan" |
| 10th | | Helu | | | Uncertain, fl. c. 2300 BC | Historicity uncertain; Held the title of, "King of Awan" |
| 11th | | Khita 𒄭𒋫𒀀 | Same person as Hita'a (?) | | Uncertain, reigned c. 2220 BC | temp. of Naram-Suen; Held the title of, "King of Awan" |
| # | Depiction | Ruler | Succession | Epithet | Approx. dates | Notes |
Gutian period (c. 2154 – c. 2112 BC)
| 12th | | Puzur-Inshushinak 𒅤𒊭𒀭𒈹𒂞 | Son of Shinpi-hish-huk | | Uncertain, r. c. 2150 BC | temp. of Gudea; Held the titles of "Military Governor of Elam", "Governor of Susa", and, "King of Awan" |

== Gallery ==
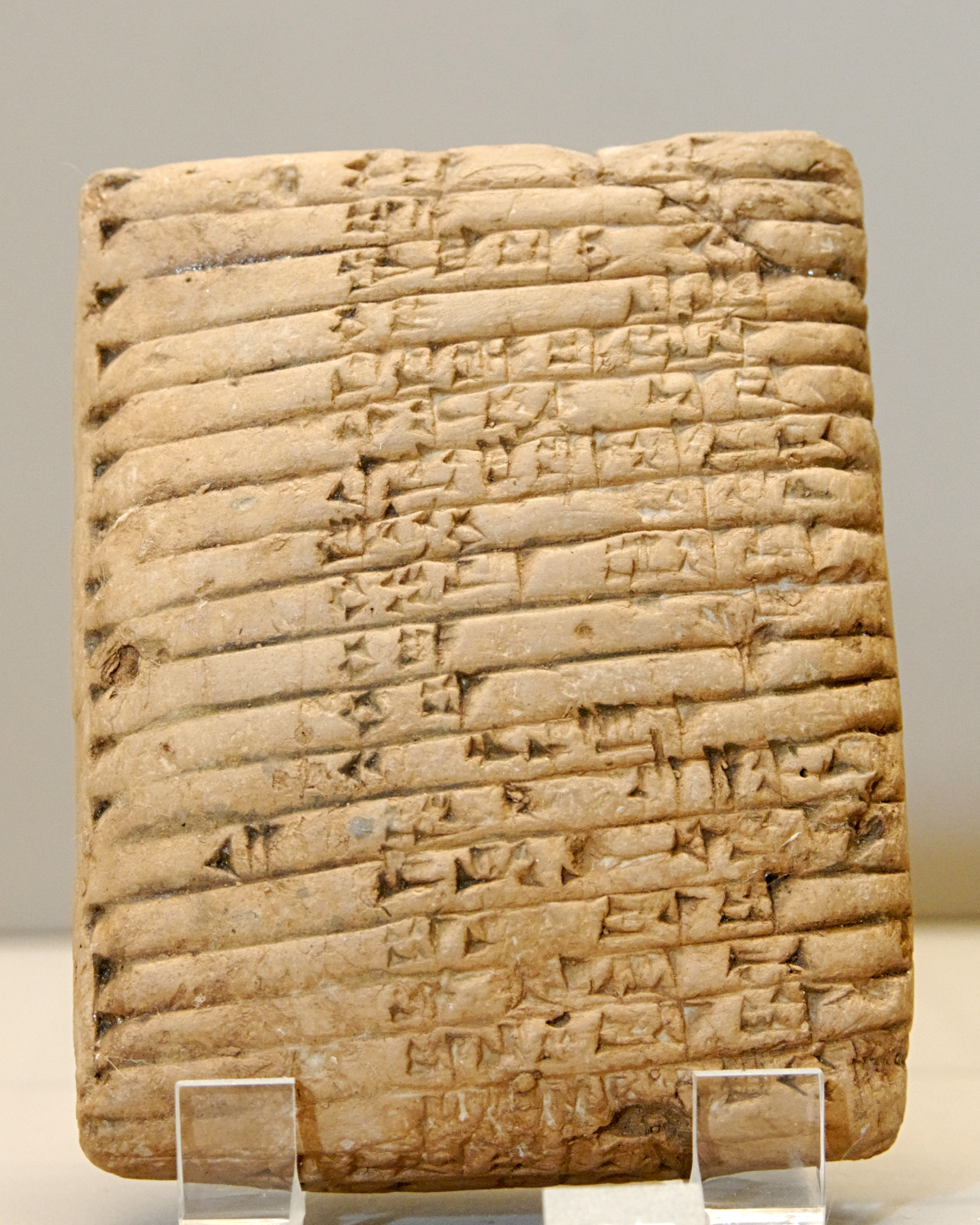
The Susanian Dynastic List—a regnal list dated to c. 1800 – c. 1600 BC and provenanced at Susa. Its current location is the Louvre Museum, Sb 17729. It names twelve kings for Awan and another twelve for Shimashki.

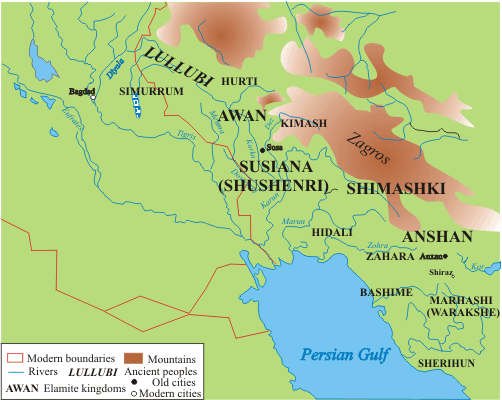
A map of the Near East detailing various ancient regions that may have been occupied by the Elamites c. 3500 – c. 2000 BC. Included are the regions of Simurrum, Lullubi, Hurti, Awan, Kimash, Susiana, Shimashki, Hidali, Anshan, Zahara, Bashime, Marhasi, and Sherihun.

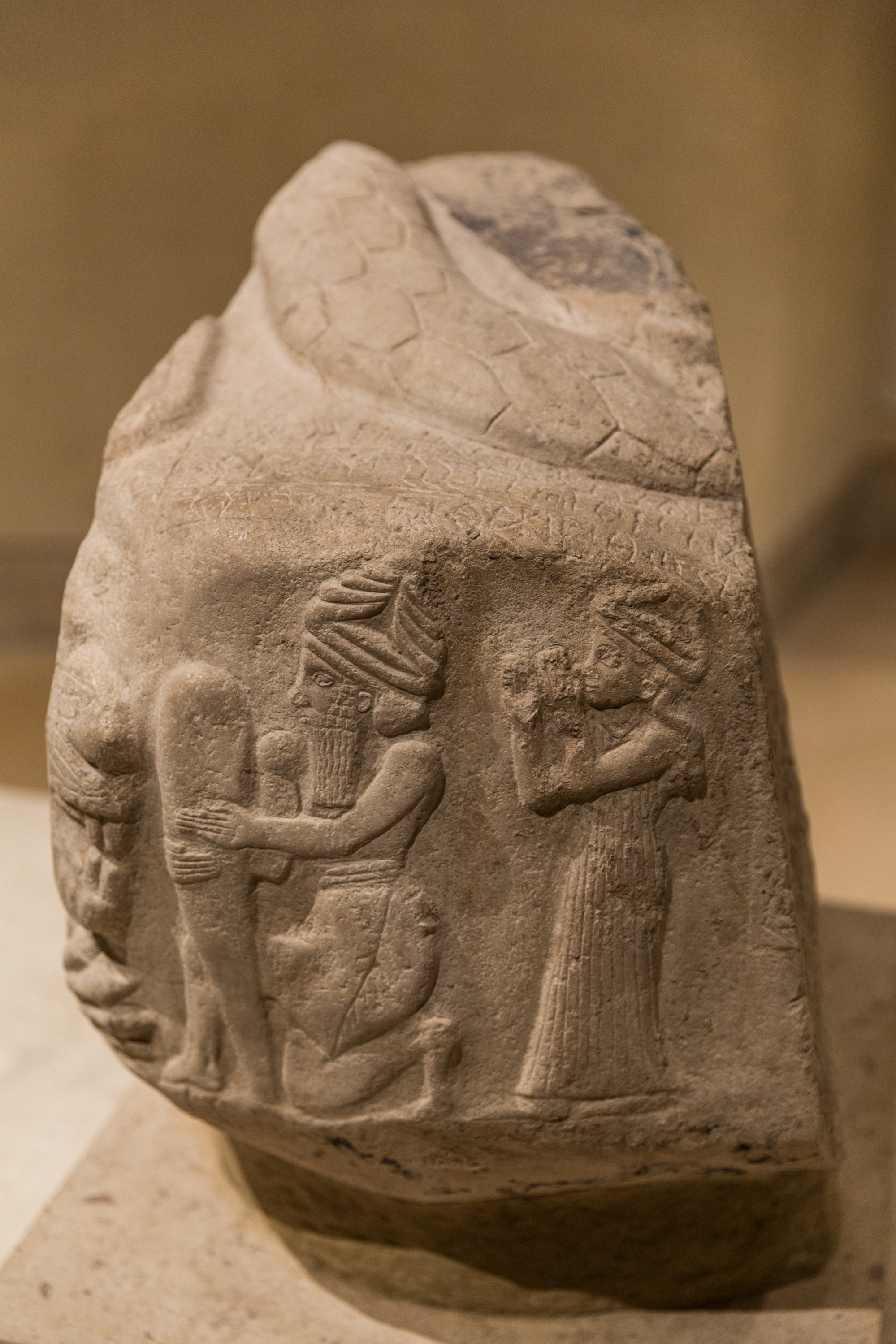
A God putting a foundation nail in the ground, protected by a Lama goddess, in front of a roaring lion. Coiled snake on top. Inscriptions in Linear Elamite and Akkadian. Time of Kutik-Inshushinak, circa 2100 BC, Louvre Museum

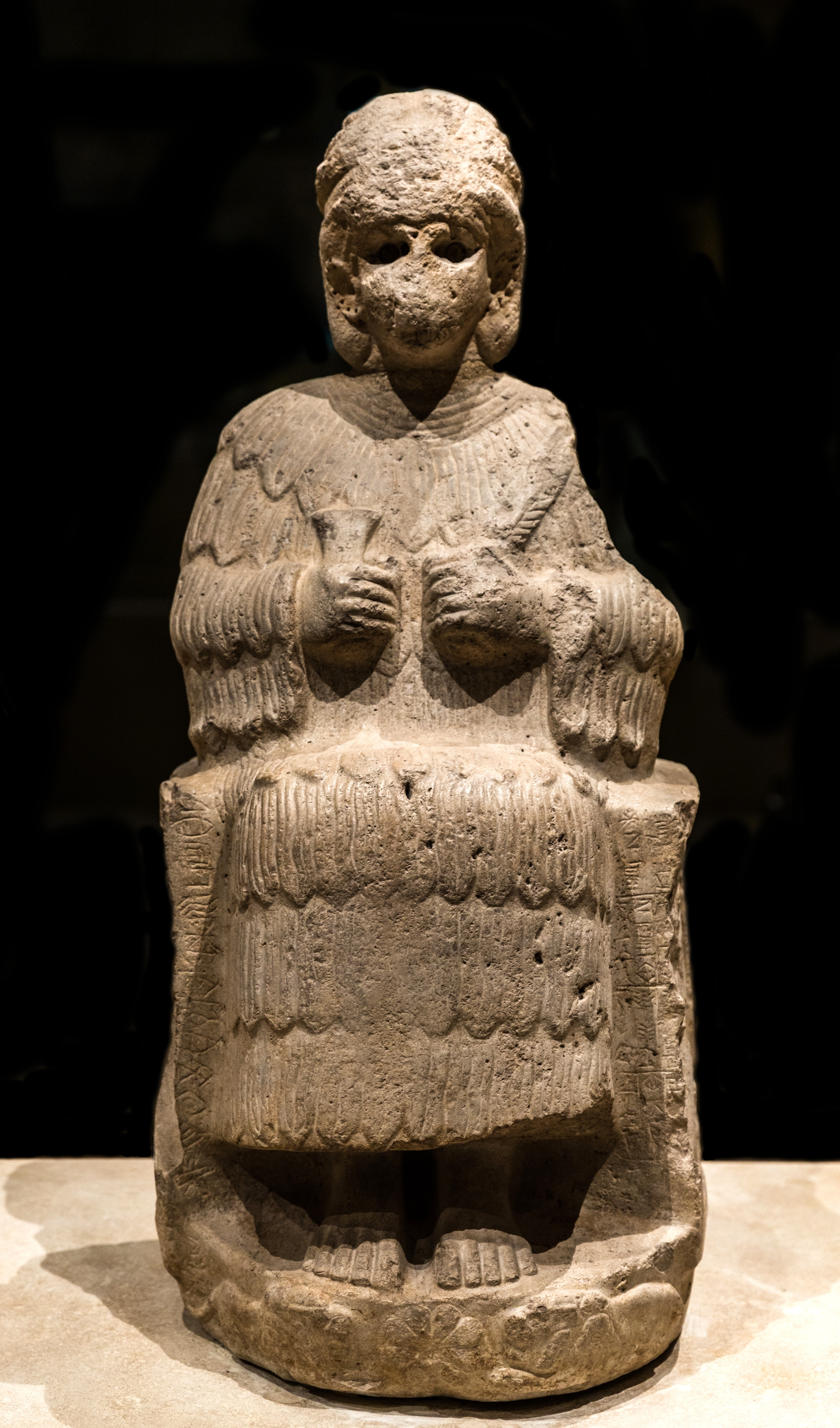
Statue of goddess Narundi dedicated by Awan king Kutik-Inshushinak, with inscriptions in Linear Elamite and in Akkadian, circa 2100 BC, Louvre Museum

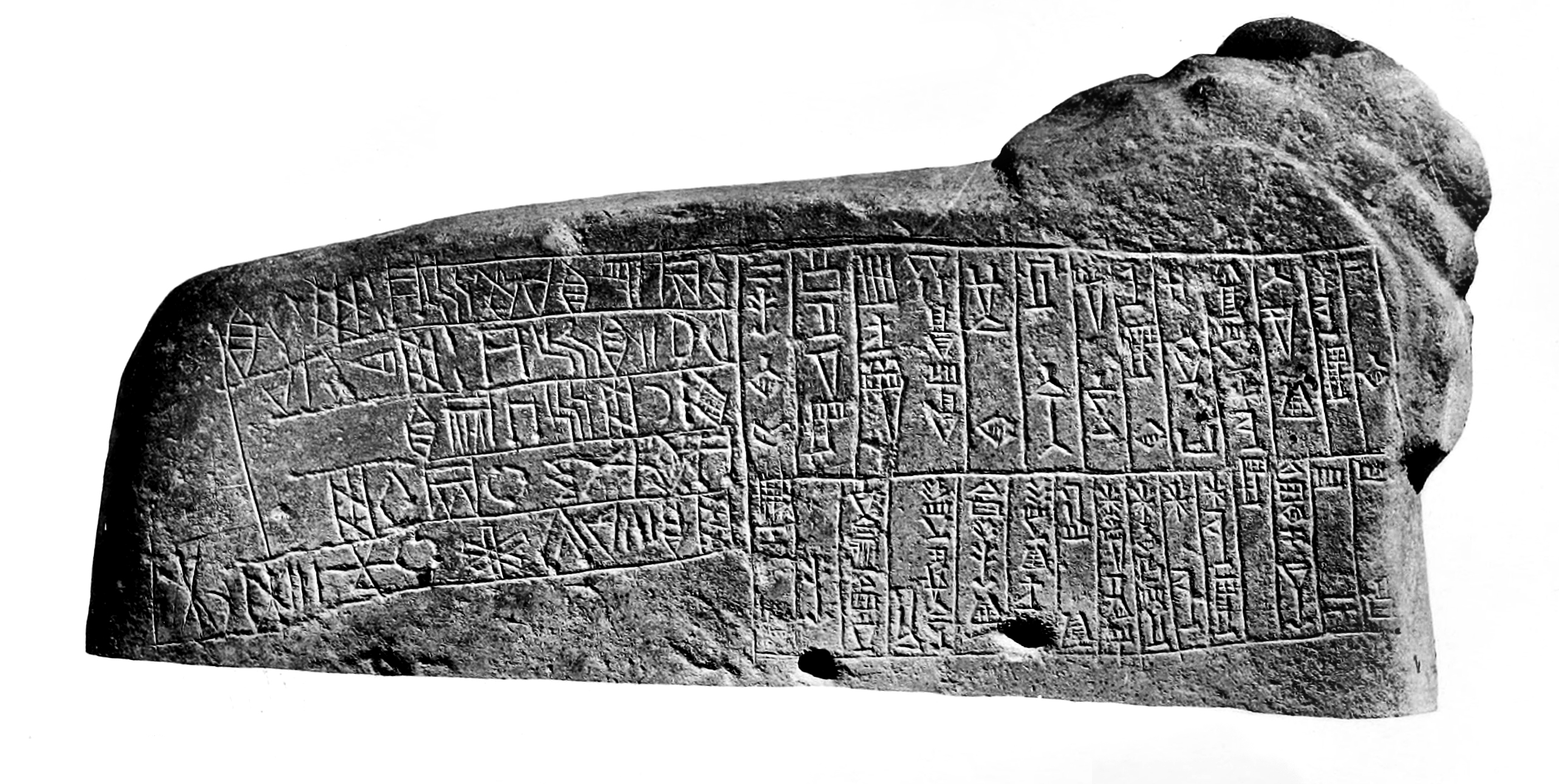
Bilingual Linear Elamite-Akkadian inscription of king Kutik-Inshushinak, "Table of the Lion", Louvre Museum Sb 17

== See also ==
- Elam
- Awan (ancient city)
- Shimashki dynasty
- Sukkalmah dynasty
- List of rulers of Elam
- List of Assyrian kings
- List of kings of Babylon
- Sumerian King List
- List of kings of Akkad
- List of rulers of the pre-Achaemenid kingdoms of Iran
- List of monarchs of Iran
