= Tata (king of Awan) =

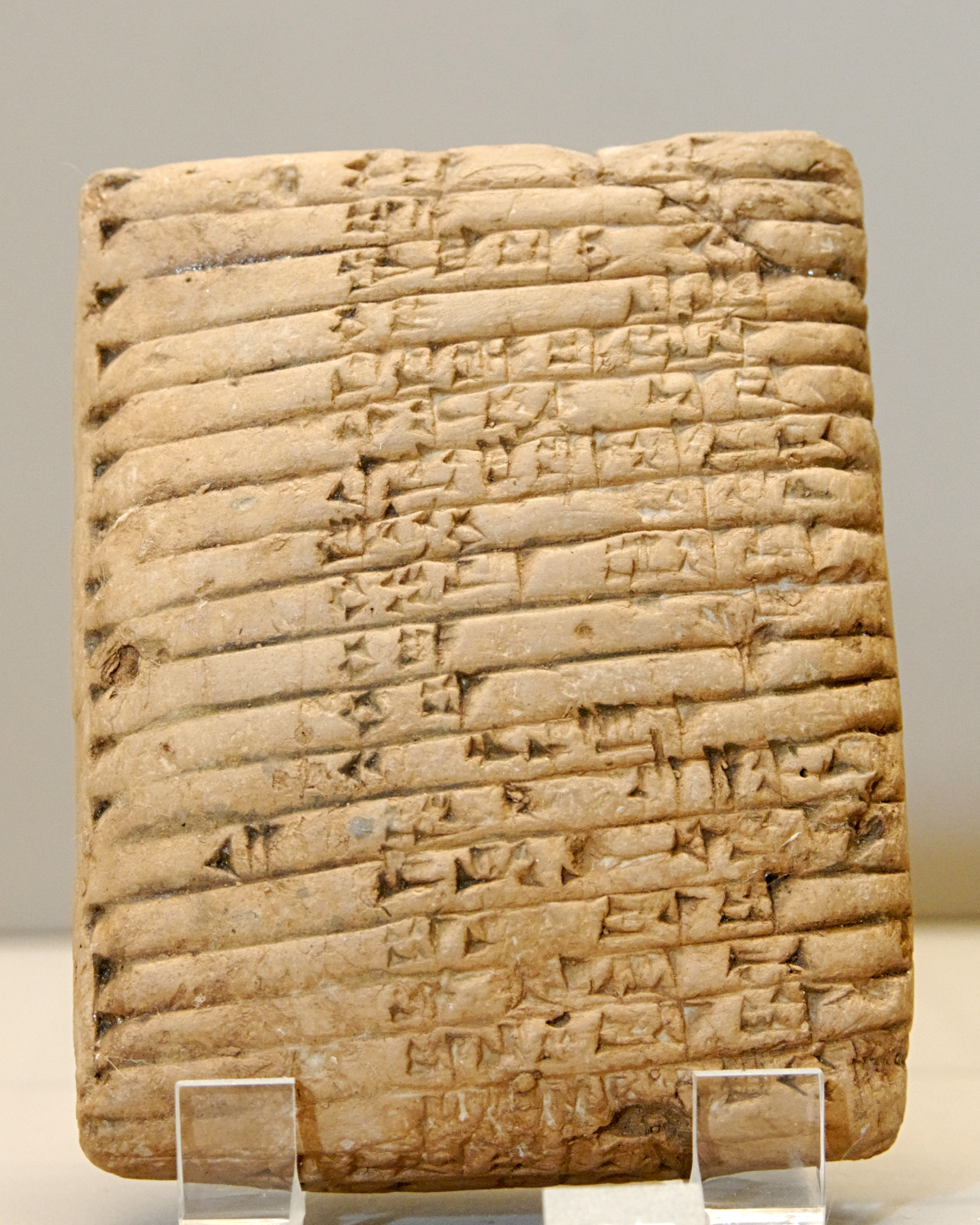
- The Susanian Dynastic List—a regnal list dated to c. 1800 – c. 1600 BC and provenanced at Susa. Its current location is the Louvre Museum, Sb 17729. It names twelve kings for Awan and another twelve for Shimashki.

King of Sumer
- Reign: fl. c. 2600 – c. 2400 BC
- Predecessor: Peli (?)
- Successor: Kur-Ishshak (?)

King of Elam
- Reign: fl. c. 2600 – c. 2400 BC
- Predecessor: Peli (?)
- Successor: Ukku-Tanhish (?)

King of Awan
- Reign: fl. c. 2600 – c. 2400 BC
- Predecessor: Peli (?)
- Successor: Ukku-Tanhish (?)
- Born: Awan
Era name and dates
- First Paleo-Elamite period: c. 2400 – c. 2015 BC
- Dynasty: Awan dynasty
- Religion: Elamite religion

Tata (also written as: Ta-a-ar, Tari/ip, Tari, and/or Taar) was the second king of the Awan dynasty and may have been the second to exercise the kingship of Awan over all of Elam. He probably reigned sometime in the first Paleo-Elamite period (c. 2400 – c. 2015 BC). Additionally; he could have possibly been the same second king from Awan said on the Sumerian King List (SKL) to exercise the kingship over all of Sumer. According to the SKL: he was preceded by an unnamed king of Awan (possibly Peli) and succeeded by Kur-Ishshak. However, the Susanian Dynastic List states that he was succeeded by Ukku-Tanhish and preceded by Peli.

== See also ==
- Mesopotamia
- Ancient Near East

| Preceded by Peli (?) | King of Sumer fl. c. 2600 – c. 2400 BC | Succeeded by Kur-Ishshak (?) |
| Preceded by Peli (?) | King of Elam fl. c. 2600 – c. 2400 BC | Succeeded by Ukku-Tanhish (?) |
| Preceded by Peli (?) | King of Awan fl. c. 2600 – c. 2400 BC | Succeeded by Ukku-Tanhish (?) |
