= Autalummash =

Autalummash (fl. c. 2325 BC) is a name discovered in a Hurrian text in the Hittite archive of Boghazkoy, where his name is stated as "King of Kings of Elam". He is also known as the king of Tukrish. His ruling time was probably before the reign of Manishtusu, king of Akkad. Therefore, he should be contemporary with the kings of Awan dynasty.

== See also ==
- List of kings of Persia

== Bibliography ==
- Cameron, George, "History of Early Iran", Chicago, 1936 (repr., Chicago, 1969; tr. E.-J. Levin, L’histoire de l’Iran antique, Paris, 1937; tr. H. Anusheh, ایران در سپیده دم تاریخ, Tehran, 1993)
- D’yakonov, I. M., "Istoriya Midii ot drevenĭshikh vremen do kontsa IV beka de e.E" (The history of Media from ancient times to the end of the 4th century BCE), Moscow and Leningrad, 1956; tr. Karim Kešāvarz as Tāriḵ-e Mād, Tehran, 1966.
