= Ram Diwali =

Place in Punjab, Pakistan

Ram Diwali رام دیوالی
- Locality
- Location within Punjab, Pakistan Location within Pakistan
- Coordinates: 31.5936°N 73.0774°E
- Country: Pakistan
- Province: Punjab
- Named for: Rama, Diwali
- Elevation: 177 m (581 ft)
- Time zone: UTC+5 (PST)

Ram Diwali (Punjabi: رام دیوالی) is a locality in Faisalabad District, Punjab, Pakistan. It comprises four villages: Chak 112 JB, Chak 2 JB, Chak 3 JB and Chak 4 JB. The locality is situated on Sargodha Road and lies to the north of the city of Faisalabad, 5 kilometres (3.1 mi) from the M–4 motorway. It is mainly inhabited by ethnic Punjabi Jats of the Randhawa clan. Prior to the Partition of British India in August 1947, the predominantly Muslim locality was also inhabited by Sikhs, who migrated to Amritsar after the creation of Pakistan. Other ethnic Punjabi Jat clans, namely Gill and Sandhu, are also settled in Ram Diwali.

== Notable people ==
- Arfa Karim (1995–2012) was an international student prodigy and record-holding youngest Microsoft Certified Professional who hailed from the village Chak 4 JB in Ram Diwali.
