= Arfa Karim =

Pakistani computer prodigy (1995–2012)

- ارفع کریم
- Karim c. 2005
- Born: Arfa Abdul Karim Randhawa; 2 February 1995; Faisalabad, Pakistan
- Died: 14 January 2012 (aged 16); Combined Military Hospital Lahore, Pakistan
- Cause of death: Cardiac arrest due to epileptic seizure
- Resting place: Ram Diwali, Faisalabad
- Education: Lahore Grammar School, Paragon City Branch
- Known for: World's youngest Microsoft Certified Professional, 2004–2008
- Awards: Fatima Jinnah Gold Medal (2005); Presidential Pride of Performance (2005)

Arfa Abdul Karim Randhawa (Urdu: ارفع عبد الکریم رندھاوا, Punjabi: ارفع عبد الکریم رندھاوا; 2 February 1995 – 14 January 2012) was a Pakistani student and computer prodigy who became the youngest Microsoft Certified Professional (MCP) in 2004. She was submitted to the Guinness Book of World Records for her achievement. Arfa kept the title until 2008 and went on to represent Pakistan on various international forums, including the TechEd Developers Conference. She received Pakistan's highest literary award, the Presidential Pride of Performance from General Pervez Musharraf in 2005. A science park in Lahore, the Arfa Software Technology Park, is named in her honour. At the age of 10, Arfa was invited by Bill Gates to visit Microsoft's headquarters in the United States. She died in 2012, aged 16, from a cardiac arrest.

== Biography ==
=== Early life ===
Randhawa was born into an ethnic Punjabi family from Ram Diwali in Faisalabad District, Punjab, Pakistan.

=== Career ===
After returning to Pakistan from a visit to the Microsoft headquarters, Randhawa gave numerous television and newspaper interviews. S. Somasegar, the vice president of Microsoft's Software Development Division, wrote about her in his blog. On 2 August 2005, Arfa was presented the Fatimah Jinnah Gold Medal in the field of Science and Technology by the prime minister of Pakistan Shaukat Aziz at the 113th anniversary of Fatima Jinnah's birth. She also received the Salaam Pakistan Youth Award in August 2005 from the president of Pakistan. Randhawa received the President's Award for Pride of Performance in 2005, a civil award usually granted to people who have shown excellence in their respective fields over a long period of time; she is the youngest recipient of this award. She was made brand ambassador for Pakistan Telecommunication Company's 3G Wireless Broadband service, "EVO", in January 2010.

=== Recognition ===
Upon her return from the US, Randhawa became an icon in Pakistan. She was interviewed by various channels, invited to several international conferences and summits, and received awards from the president and prime minister of Pakistan. In 2006, Microsoft invited her to be the keynote speaker at the Tech-Ed developers conference held in Barcelona.

=== Representation at international forums ===
Randhawa represented Pakistan on various international forums and was invited by the Pakistan Information Technology Professionals Forum for a two-week stay in Dubai, where a dinner reception was hosted in her honour; Dubai dignitaries, including the Ambassador of Pakistan, attended. She was presented with various awards and gifts, including a laptop. In November 2006, Randhawa attended the Tech-Ed Developers conference themed Get Ahead of The Game held in after receiving an invitation from Microsoft. She was the only Pakistani among over 5000 developers in that conference.

=== Death ===
In 2011, Randhawa was studying at the Lahore Grammar School Paragon Campus in her second year of A-levels. On 22 December 2011, she had a cardiac arrest after an epileptic seizure that damaged her brain and was admitted to Lahore's Combined Military Hospital (CMH) in critical condition.

On 9 January 2012, Bill Gates, chairman of Microsoft, contacted Randhawa's parents and directed her doctors to adopt "every kind of measure" for her treatment. Gates set up a special panel of international doctors who remained in contact with her local doctors through teleconference. The panel assisted in diagnosing and treating her illness. Local doctors dismissed the option of moving Randhawa to another hospital due to her being on a ventilator and in critical condition. Members of her family have lauded Bill Gates for offering to bear her treatment expenses.

Randhawa began to improve on 13 January 2012, and some areas of her brain began to show indications of healing. Microsoft had discussed flying her to the United States for treatment, according to her father, Amjad Abdul Karim Randhawa.

Randhawa died at a hospital in Lahore on 14 January 2012, aged 16. Her funeral, which was held on the following day, was attended by the Chief Minister of Punjab, Shahbaz Sharif. She was buried in her ancestral village Chak No. 4JB Ram Diwali, on Faisalabad-Sargodha Road Faisalabad.

== Arfa Software Technology Park ==
Arfa Software Technology Park is the country's largest Information and Communications Technology Park located in Lahore. The seventeen-storey building is the first international standard facility in Pakistan. The project started under the name "Lahore Technology Park" before being renamed "Arfa Software Technology Park" on 15 January 2012. There is a permanent secretariat of the Arfa Karim Foundation at the Arfa Software Technology Park.

== See also ==
- Sana Yousaf
- Muhammad Huzair Awan
