= Luh-ishan =

Luh-ishan 𒇻𒄴𒅖𒀭
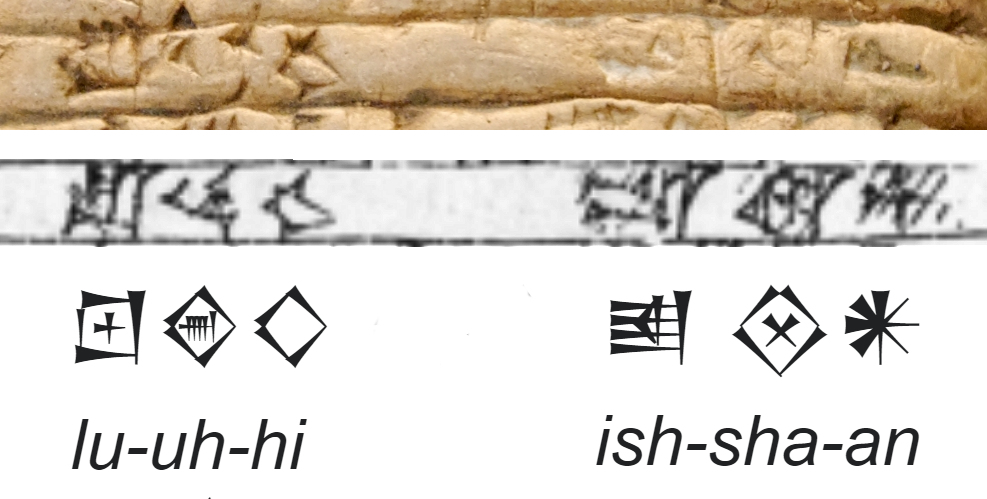
- Luh-ishan on the Awan Kings List

King of Elam
- Reign: c. 2350 – c. 2325 BC
- Predecessor: Possibly Hishep-ratep
- Successor: Position abolished
- Died: c. 2325 BC
- Dynasty: Awan Dynasty

Location of Susa

Luh-ishan, also Luhhiššan, Luh-ishshan, Lu-ishan (𒇻𒄴𒅖𒀭 lu-uh-ish-an, also 𒇻𒄴𒄭 𒅖𒊮𒀭 lu-uh-hi ish-sha-an; died c. 2325 BC) was a king of Elam and the 8th king of the Awan Dynasty. Hishep-ratep, if he is to be identified with Hishep-rashini, was the father of Luh-ishan.

Lu-ishan is known from Elamite sources, such as the Awan Dynasty king list, where he is listed as the 8th king of the Awan Dynasty.

Lu-ishan also appears in the inscriptions of Sargon of Akkad, who vanquished him when he conquered Elam and Marhasi. Sargon claims in his inscriptions that he is "Sargon, king of the world, conqueror of Elam and Parahshum", the two major polities to the east of Sumer. He also names various rulers of the east whom he vanquished, such as "Luh-uh-ish-an, son of Hishibrasini, king of Elam", thought to be Lu-sihan, or " Sidga'u, general of Parahshum"(during the reign of Abalgamash), who later also appears in an inscription by Rimush.

== See also ==
- Mesopotamia
- Ancient Near East

| Preceded by Possibly Hishep-ratep | King of Elam c. 2350 BC | Succeeded by Position abolished |
| Preceded by Possibly Hishep-ratep | King of Awan c. 2350 BC | Succeeded by Position abolished |
