= Avan, Sweden =

Avan
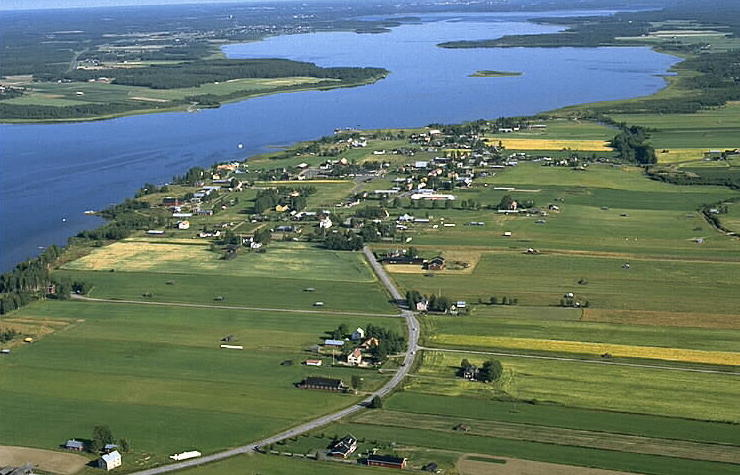

- Location within Norrbotten Location within Sweden
- Coordinates: 65°40′49″N 21°48′13″E
- Country: Sweden
- Province: Norrbotten
- County: Norrbotten County
- Municipality: Luleå Municipality

Area
  - Total: 0.65 km^{2} (0.25 sq mi)

Population (31 December 2010)
  - Total: 200
  - Density: 310/km^{2} (800/sq mi)
- Time zone: UTC+1 (CET)
  - Summer (DST): UTC+2 (CEST)

Avan is a locality situated in Luleå Municipality, Norrbotten County, Sweden with 200 inhabitants in 2010.
