= Awan, Bhulath =

Awan
- Village
- Location in Punjab, India Awan (India)
- Coordinates: 31.611349°N 75.559693°E
- Country: India
- State: Punjab
- District: Kapurthala

Government
  - Type: Panchayati raj (India)
  - Body: Gram panchayat

Population (2011)
  - Total: 1,143
- Sex ratio 556/587♂/♀

Languages
  - Official: Punjabi
  - Other spoken: Hindi
- Time zone: UTC+5:30 (Indian Standard Time)
- PIN: 144636
- Telephone code: 01822
- ISO 3166 code: IN-PB
- Vehicle registration: PB-09
- Website: kapurthala.gov.in

Awan is a village in Bhulath Tehsil in Kapurthala district of Punjab State, India. It is located 9 kilometres (5.6 mi) from Bhulath, 35 kilometres (22 mi) away from district headquarter Kapurthala. The village is administrated by a Sarpanch, who is an elected representative.

== Demography ==
According to the report published by Census India in 2011, Awan has 279 houses with a total population of 1,143, of which 556 are male and 587 females. The literacy rate of Awan is 70.55%, lower than the state average of 75.84%. The population of children in the age group 0–6 years is 131 which is 11.46% of the total population. The child sex ratio is approximately 1056, higher than the state average of 846.

== Population data ==
Particulars	Total	Male	Female
Total No. of Houses	279	—	—
Population	1,143	556	587
Child (0–6)	131	85	46
Schedule Caste	275	153	122
Schedule Tribe	0	0	0
Literacy	70.55 %	71.76 %	69.50 %
Total Workers	268	250	18
Main Worker	256	0	0
Marginal Worker	12	8	4

As per the 2011 census of India, 268 people were engaged in work activities out of the total population of Awan, which includes 250 males and 18 females. According to the census survey report 2011, 95.52% of workers (employment or earning more than six months) describe their work as main work and 4.48% of workers are involved in marginal activity providing livelihood for less than six months.

== Caste ==
24.06% of total population of the village is constituted by a schedule caste (SC); it doesn't have any Schedule Tribe (ST) population.

== Nearby cities ==
- Bhulath
- Kapurthala
- Phagwara
- Sultanpur Lodhi

== Travel connectivity ==
The closest International airport to the village is Sri Guru Ram Dass Jee International Airport.
