= Muhammad Hanif Malik =

Pakistani politician

Member of the Provincial Assembly of the Punjab
- In office 1 June 2013 – 31 May 2018
- Constituency: PP-114 (Gujrat-VII)

Member of the National Assembly of Pakistan
- In office 17 December 2012 – 16 March 2013
- Constituency: NA-107 (Gujrat-IV)

Personal details
- Born: 5 May 1952 (age 74) Gujrat, Punjab, Pakistan
- Other political affiliations: Pakistan Muslim League (N)

Muhammad Hanif Malik Awan is a Pakistani politician who had been a Member of the Provincial Assembly of the Punjab, from 1997 to 1999 and again from June 2013 to May 2018. He had been a member of the National Assembly of Pakistan from December 2012 to March 2013.

== Early life and education ==
He was born on 5 May 1952 in Gujrat.

He has received matriculation level education.

== Political career ==
He ran for the seat of the Provincial Assembly of the Punjab as an independent candidate from Constituency PP-95 (Gujrat-cum-Jhelum) in the 1993 Pakistani general election but was unsuccessful. He received 20,726 votes and lost the seat to a candidate of Pakistan Muslim League (J) (PML-J).

He was elected to the Provincial Assembly of the Punjab as a candidate of Pakistan Muslim League (N) (PML-N) from Constituency PP-95 (Gujrat-cum-Jhelum) in the 1997 Pakistani general election. He received 29,854 votes and defeated a candidate of PML-J.

He could not contest the 2002 general election due to graduation degree requirement.

He was elected to the National Assembly of Pakistan from Constituency NA-107 (Gujrat-IV) as a candidate of PML-N in by-polls held in 2012. He received 70,434 votes and defeated Rehman Naseer, a candidate of Pakistan Muslim League (Q) (PML-Q).

He was re-elected to the Provincial Assembly of the Punjab as a candidate of PML-N from Constituency PP-114 (Gujrat-VII) in the 2013 Pakistani general election. He received 40,428 votes and defeated Raja Muhammad Naeem Nawaz, a candidate of Pakistan Tehreek-e-Insaf (PTI).
