= Muhammad Huzair Awan =

Pakistani child prodigy, public speaker

- Born: June 5, 2006 (age 19); Pakistan

Muhammad Huzair Awan (Urdu: محمد ہزیر اعوان; born: 5 June 2006, also known as Cyber Kid) is a Pakistani Information Technology (IT) professional and public speaker. In 2013, he became the youngest Microsoft Certified Professional (MCP) at the age of seven, after Arfa Karim Randhawa who achieved this title at the age of nine. He became the youngest International Computer Driving License Certified (ICDL) in 2014 at the age of eight. He is the Brand Ambassador of IEEE-Pakistan since 2014. In 2019, he has been included in the UNICEF Adolescent Champion Project.
