= Avan, East Azerbaijan =

Avan اوان
- Village
- Location within Iran
- Coordinates: 38°45′14″N 46°22′19″E
- Country: Iran
- Province: East Azerbaijan
- County: Varzaqan
- Bakhsh: Kharvana
- Rural District: Jushin

Population (2006)
  - Total: 369
- Time zone: UTC+3:30 (IRST)
  - Summer (DST): UTC+4:30 (IRDT)

Avan (Persian: اوان, also Romanized as Āvān and Ovan) is a village in Jushin Rural District, Kharvana District, Varzaqan County, East Azerbaijan Province, Iran. At the 2006 census, its population was 369, in 96 families.
