= Hishep-ratep =

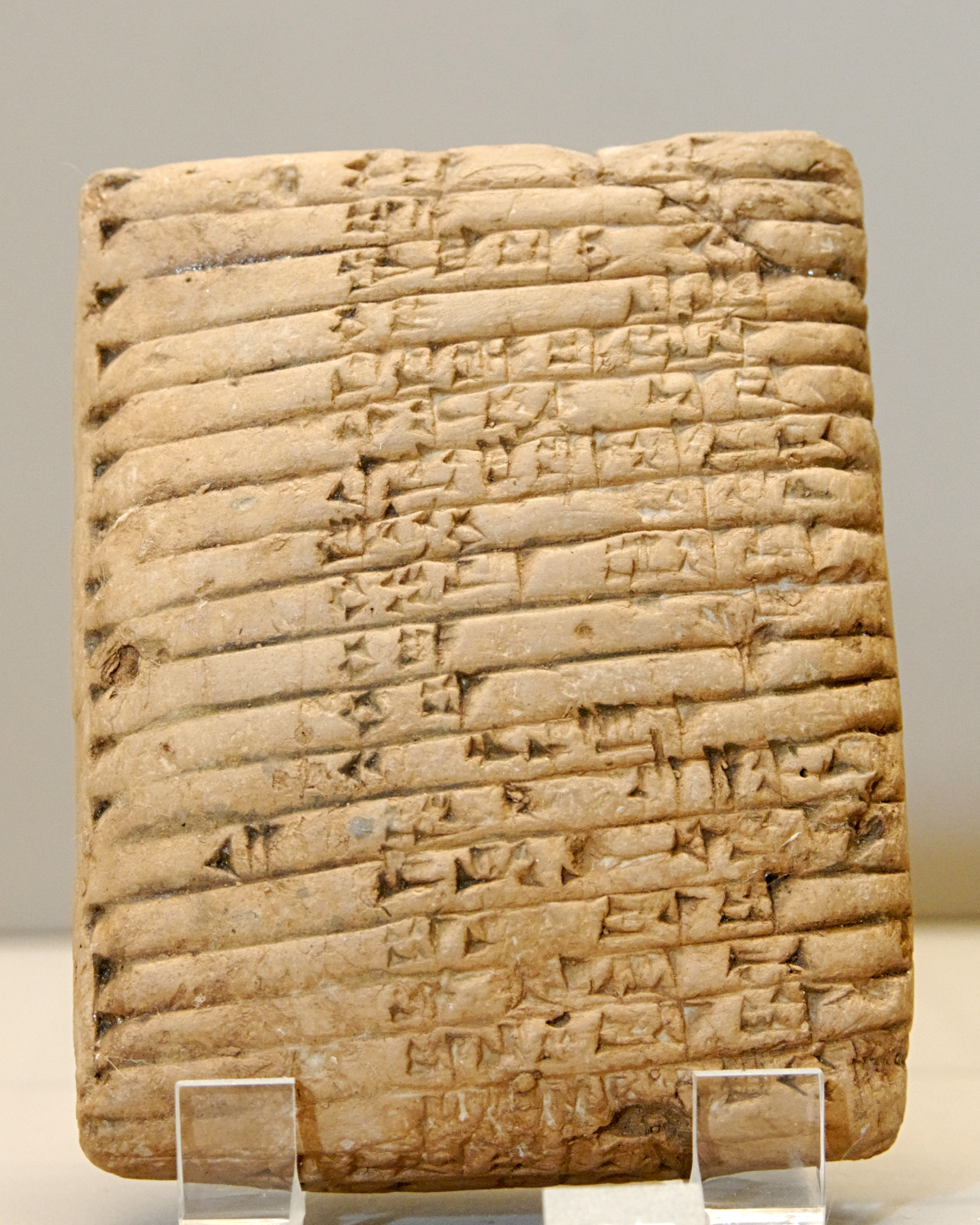
- The Awan King List. Hishep-ratep appears as the ninth ruler on this document.

King of Elam
- Reign: c. 2350 BC
- Predecessor: Possibly Luh-ishan or Kikku-Siwe-Temti
- Successor: Possibly Luh-ishan or Helu
- Dynasty: Awan

Hishep-ratep (fl. c. 2350 BC), the ninth name on the Awan king list, identified as Hishep-rashini (Hišibrašini) in Akkadian inscriptions, was a king of Elam belonging to the Awan Dynasty.

== King of Elam ==
Hishep-ratep, if he is to be identified with Hishep-rashini, was the father of Luh-ishan. According to an inscription of Sargon of Akkad, who conquered Elam shortly after the reign of Hishep-ratep, lists the rulers he defeated, including Luh-ishan, "son of Hishep-rashini."

During the Awan dynasty, there was a strong bureaucratic system: a certain Zinuba was the ensi of Susa, and was known to have been the brother of Hishep-ratep.

When Sargon died and Rimush became king of Akkad, Hishep-ratep revolted against the new king, entering into an alliance with Abalgamash, the king of Marhashi. Rimush seems to have put down the revolt however, and Hishep-ratep's fate is uncertain.

Preceded by Possibly Luh-ishan or Kikku-Siwe-Temti	King of Elam c. 2350 BC	Succeeded by Possibly Luh-ishan or Helu
