= Khita =

Khita 𒄭𒋫𒀀
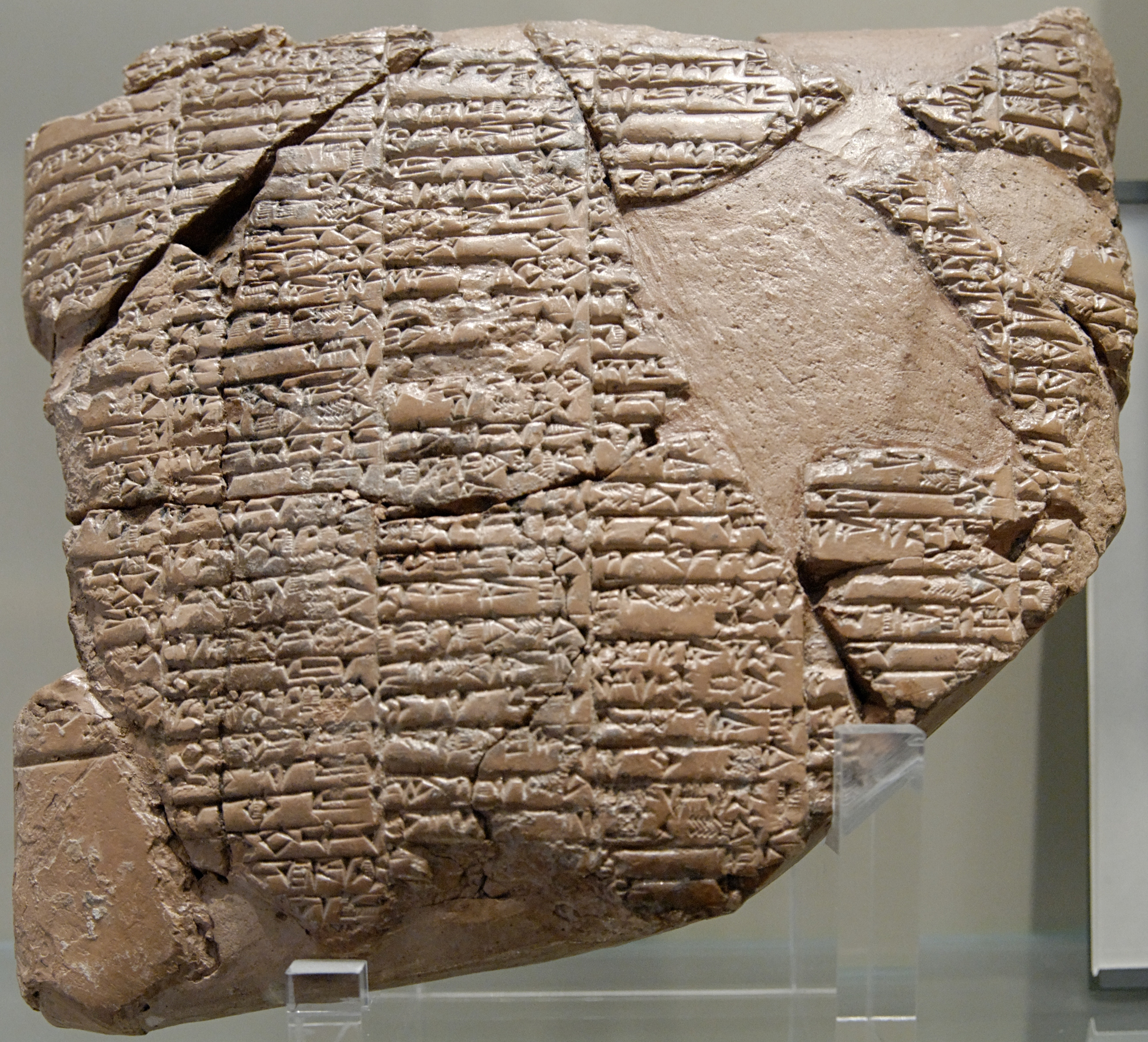
- Probable treaty of alliance between Naram-Sin and Khita of Susa, king of Awan, c. 2250, Susa, Louvre Museum

Governor of Elam
- Reign: c. 2250 BC
- Predecessor: Possibly Eshpum

Khita ruled from Susa

Khita, sometimes Hita in Elamite (𒄭𒋫𒀀 hi-ta-a; fl. c. 2250 BC), was governor of Elam and the 11th king of the Awan Dynasty of Elam, around 2250 BC. He was most likely the grandfather of the famous Elamite ruler Kutik-Inshushinak, who succeeded him on the throne.

Elam had been under the domination of Akkad, at least temporarily, since the time of Sargon. Khita is probably recorded as having signed a peace treaty with Naram-Sin of Akkad, stating: "The enemy of Naram-Sin is my enemy, the friend of Naram-Sin is my friend". The inscription was discovered in Susa. It has been suggested that the formal treaty allowed Naram-Sin to have peace on his eastern borders, so that he could deal more effectively with the threat from Gutium.

Further study of the treaty suggests that Khita provided Elamite troops to Naram-Sin, that he married his daughter to the Akkadian king, and that he agreed to set up statues of Naram-Sin in the sanctuaries of Susa. As a matter of fact, it is well known that Naram-Sin had extreme influence over Susa during his reign, building temples and establishing inscriptions in his name, and having the Akkadian language replace Elamite in official documents.

This inscription is the first known official document in the Elamite language, but using the Akkadian cuneiform script. It was set up in the temple of Inshushinak in Susa.

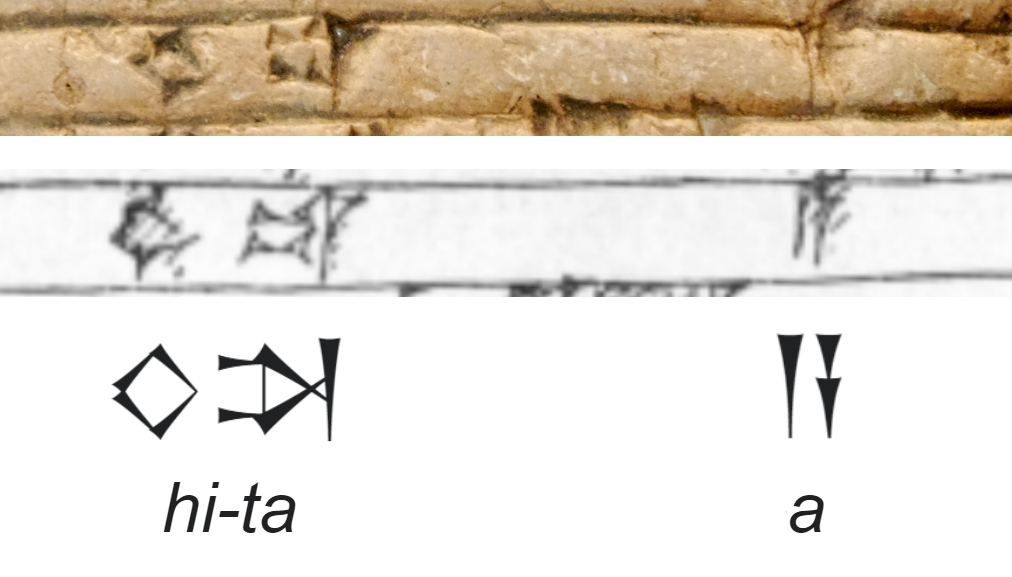
Khita on the Awan Kings List

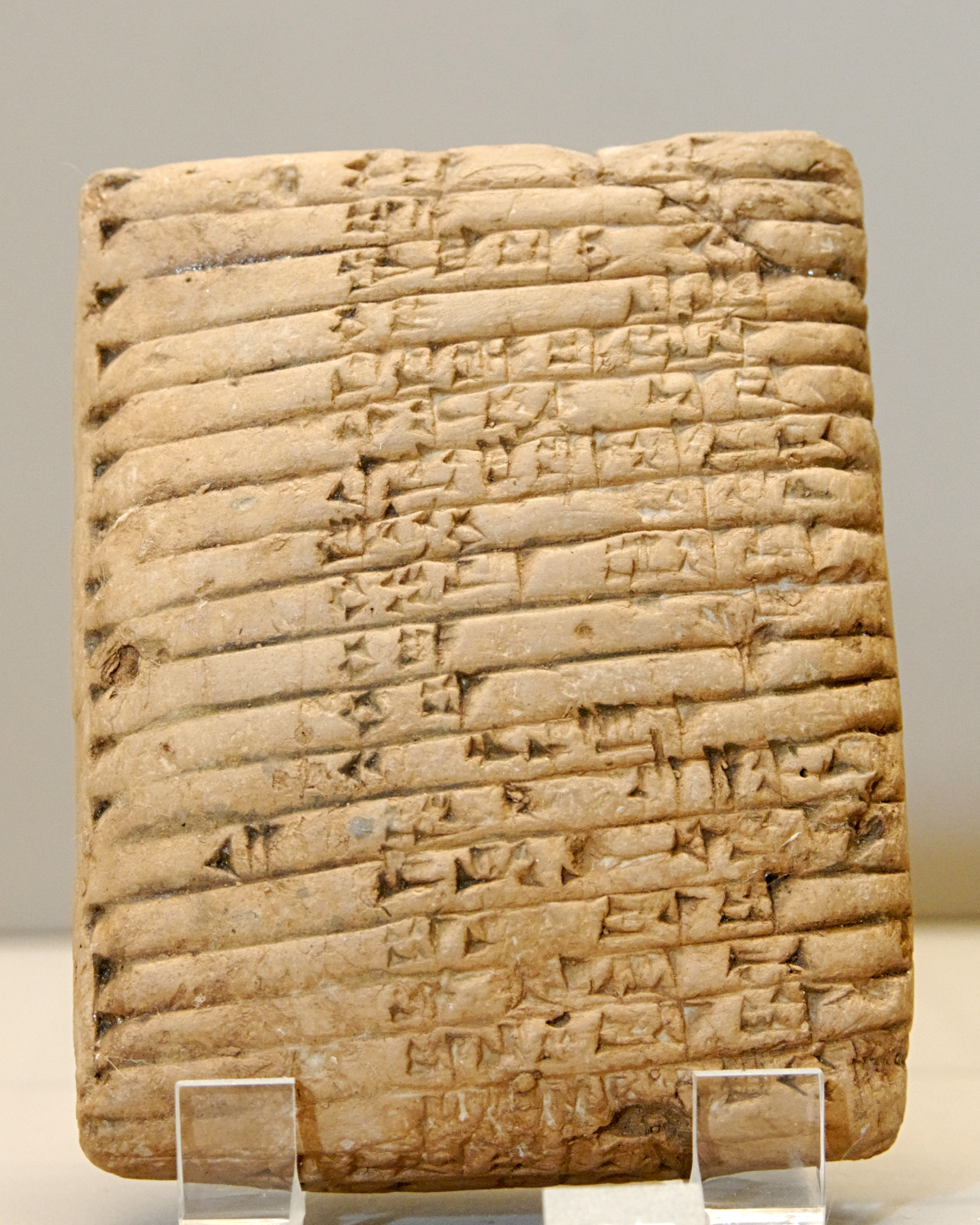
The Awan Kings List, where Khita appears as the 11th king of Awan

Preceded by Possibly Eshpum	Governor of Elam c. 2250 BC	Succeeded by
