= Susuda =

Susada
- First appearance: Sumerian King List c. 2000 BC

In-universe information
- Occupation: King of Kish (reigned c. 201 years)

Susada appears as the first king of the second dynasty of Kish in some versions of the Sumerian King List. According to that literary composition, Susada ruled for 201 years. The kings on the early part of the SKL are usually not considered historical, except when they are mentioned in contemporary documents. Susada is not one of them.
