= Tempore =

Term in historical works for approximate lifespans

Tempore (abbreviated to temp.), in historical literature, denotes a period during which a person whose exact lifespan is unknown, was known to have been alive or active, or some other date which is not exactly known, usually given as the reign of a monarch. The word is Latin, being the ablative singular of the noun tempus, temporis, "time", thus meaning "in the time (of)". It should be followed by a name in the genitive case. The theoretical full form might be vixit tempore Regis Henrici Primi ("they lived in the time of King Henry the First"; i.e. 1100–1135).

The best-known occurrence is in the Domesday Book of 1086, where the phrase Tempore Regis Eduardi (nominative case Rex Eduardus), meaning "in the time of King Edward (the Confessor)", appears in the entry for almost every manor, abbreviated as TRE. It thus signifies the date range 1042–1066. It is useful in historical literature because the names of many historical persons appear in surviving documents only in royal charters, possibly as witnesses, which can be dated to the reign of the originating monarch.

The word tempore is often given in its abbreviated form temp. It is similar to floruit ("flourished" [at a date or range of dates]), which however is more appropriate for artists to denote not merely a period of life, but a particularly productive period within that lifespan.
