= Regnal list =

List of successive monarchs

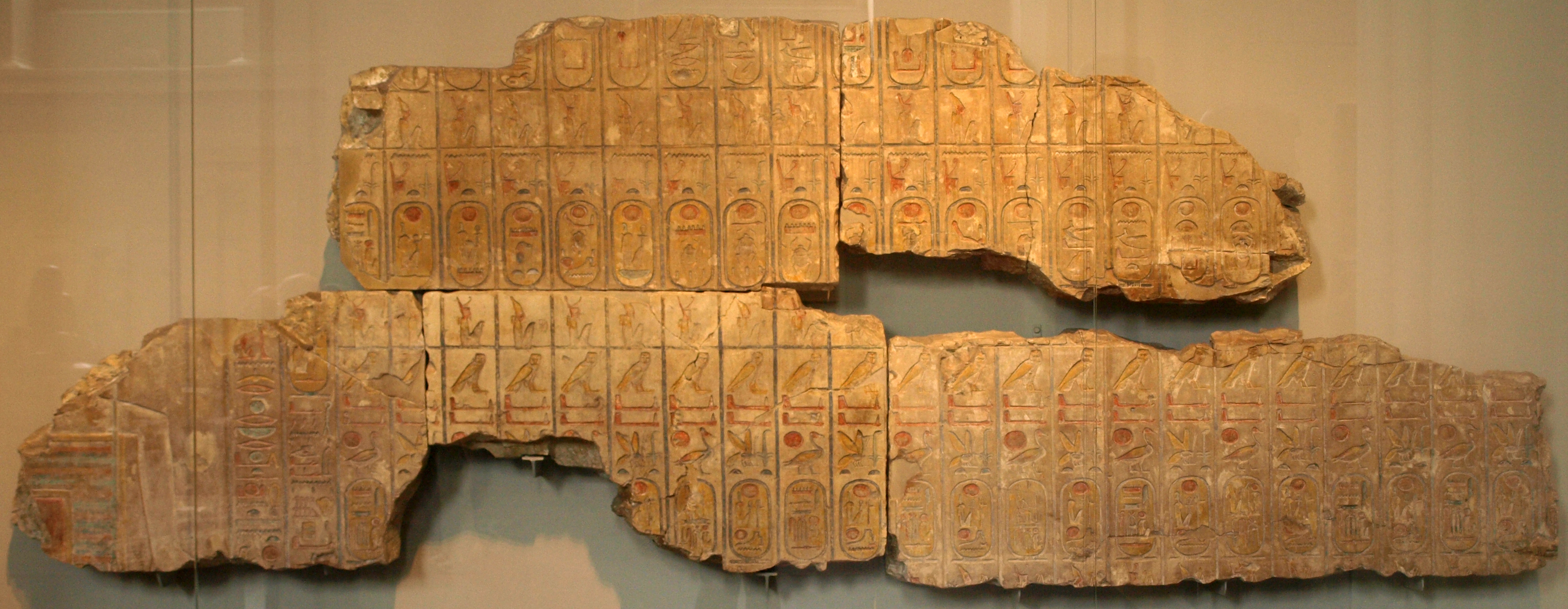
A section of the Abydos King List of Ramesses II from ancient Egypt

A regnal list or king list is, at its simplest, a list of successive monarchs. Some regnal lists may give the relationship between successive monarchs (e.g., son, brother), the length of reign of each monarch or annotations on important reigns. The list may be divided into dynasties marked off by headings. As a distinct genre, the regnal list originates in the ancient Near East. Its purpose was not originally chronological. It originally served to demonstrate the antiquity and legitimacy of the monarchy, but it became an important device for structuring historical narratives (as in Herodotus) and thus a chronological aid.

In antiquity, regnal lists were kept in Sumer, Egypt, Israel, Assyria and Babylonia. King lists have made it into sacred religious texts, such as the Puranas and the Hebrew Bible, which contains an Edomite king list.

Regnal lists were kept in early medieval Ireland, Pictland and Anglo-Saxon England. The historian David Dumville regarded them as more reliable than genealogies because they can be manipulated "in a smaller variety of ways than a genealogy". For example, some genealogies may have been fabricated from pre-existing regnal lists. In early medieval Wales, the regnal list was unknown and one copyist, confronted with a mere list of Roman emperors, converted it into a pedigree.

In African historiography, king lists passed down orally have been used to provide dates and chronologies. This is done via generational averaging, with the most common length chosen for a generation being 27 years.

== Historical examples ==
- Abydos King List
  - Abydos King List (Ramesses II)
- Canon of Kings
- Den seal impressions
- Regnal lists of Ethiopia
  - 1922 regnal list of Ethiopia
- Karnak King List
- Medinet Habu king list
- Nominalia of the Bulgarian Khans
- Palermo Stone
- Ramesseum king list
- Saqqara King List
- Series ducum Bavariae
- Sumerian King List
- Turin King List
