= Lugal =

Sumerian term for rulers

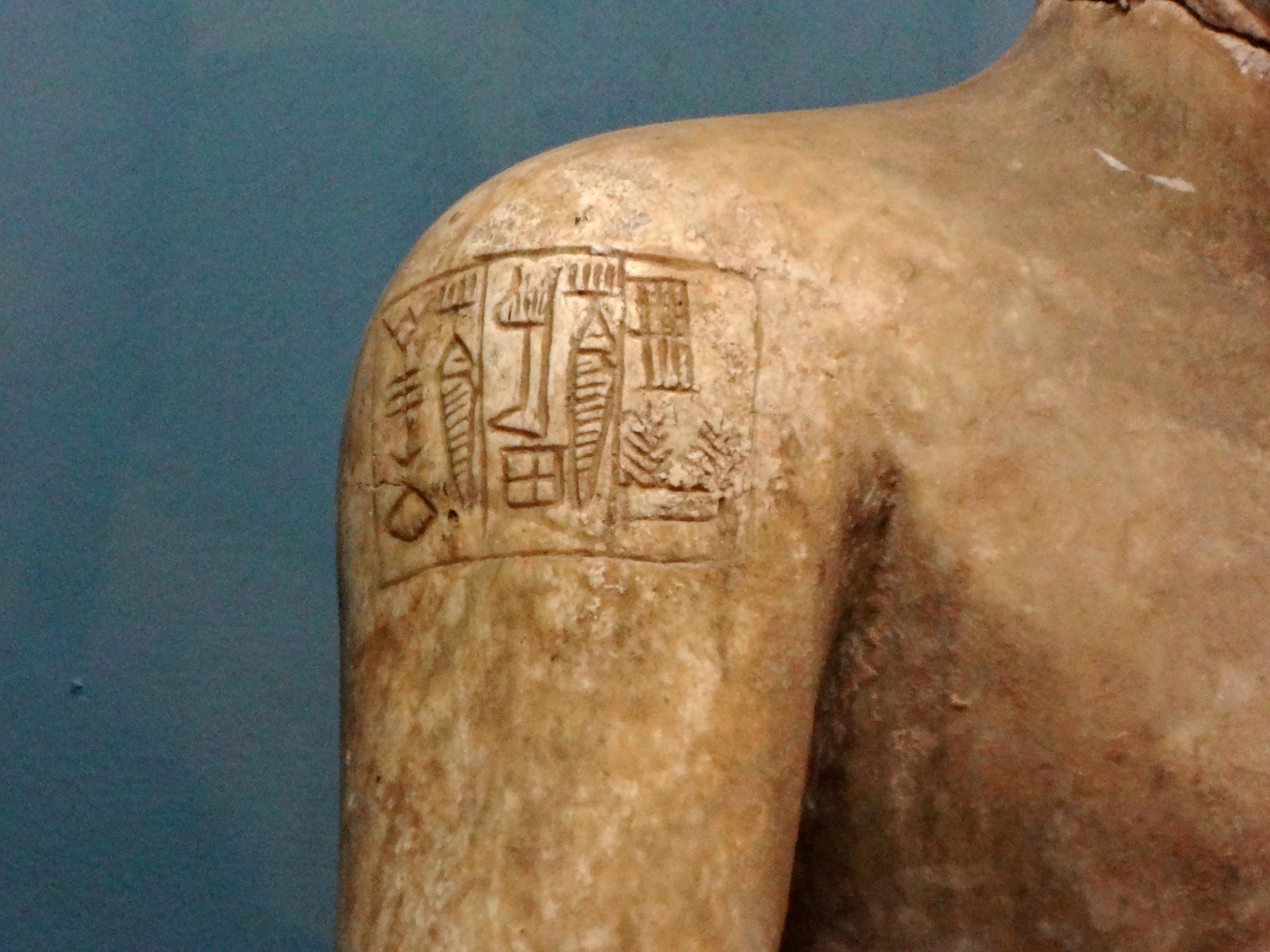
Detail of the Sumerian statue of Lugal-dalu, King of Adab – as stated in the inscription of circa mid-3rd millennium BC, inscription including the Sumerian cuneiform sign of lugal

Lugal (Sumerian: 𒈗) is the Sumerian term for "king, ruler". Literally, the term means "big man". In Sumerian, lú "𒇽" is "man" and gal "𒃲" is "great", or "big".

It was one of several Sumerian titles that a ruler of a city-state could bear (alongside en and ensi, the exact difference being a subject of debate). The sign eventually became the predominant logograph for "King" in general. In the Sumerian language, lugal is used to mean an owner (e.g. of a boat or a field) or a head or chief (of a unit, such as a family).

As a cuneiform logograph (Sumerogram) LUGAL (Unicode: 𒈗, rendered in Neo Assyrian).

== Cuneiform ==
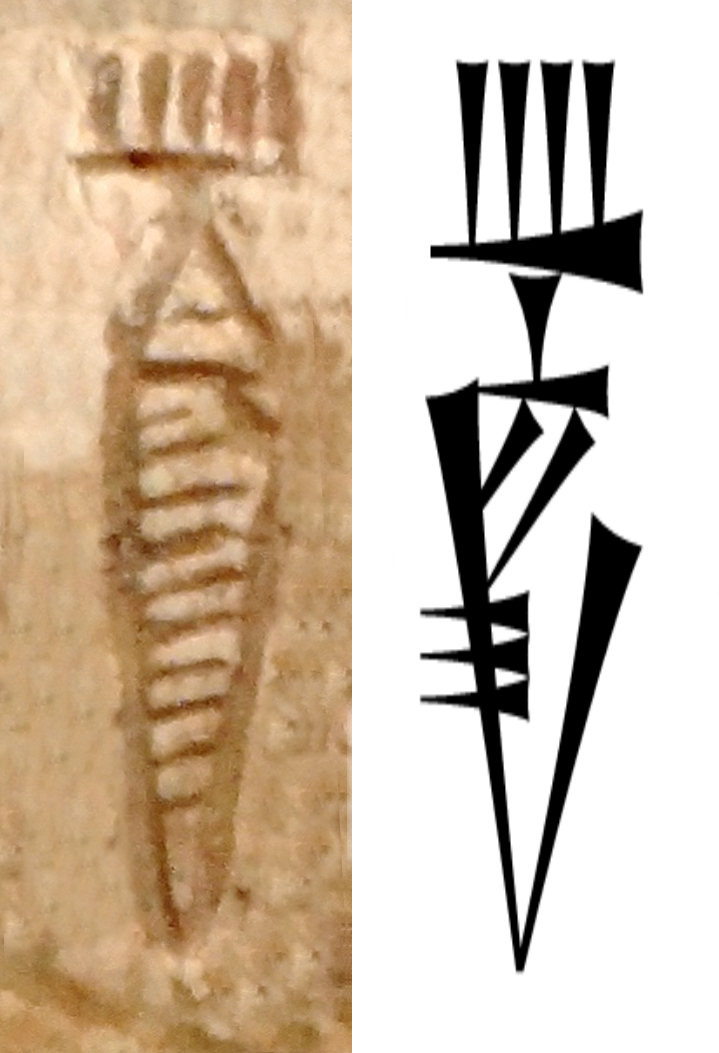
"Lugal" in archaic and early cuneiform on the Lugal-dalu statue

The cuneiform sign LUGAL 𒈗 (Borger nr. 266, Unicode U+12217) serves as a determinative in cuneiform texts (Sumerian, Akkadian and Hittite), indicating that the following word is the name of a king. In Akkadian orthography, it may also be a syllabogram šàr, acrophonically based on the Akkadian for "king", šarrum.

Unicode also includes the cuneiform characters U+12218 𒈘 CUNEIFORM SIGN LUGAL OVER LUGAL, and U+12219 𒈙 CUNEIFORM SIGN LUGAL OPPOSING LUGAL. They are alternate forms for adamin, "contest, dispute, debate"

== Lugal, ensi and en ==
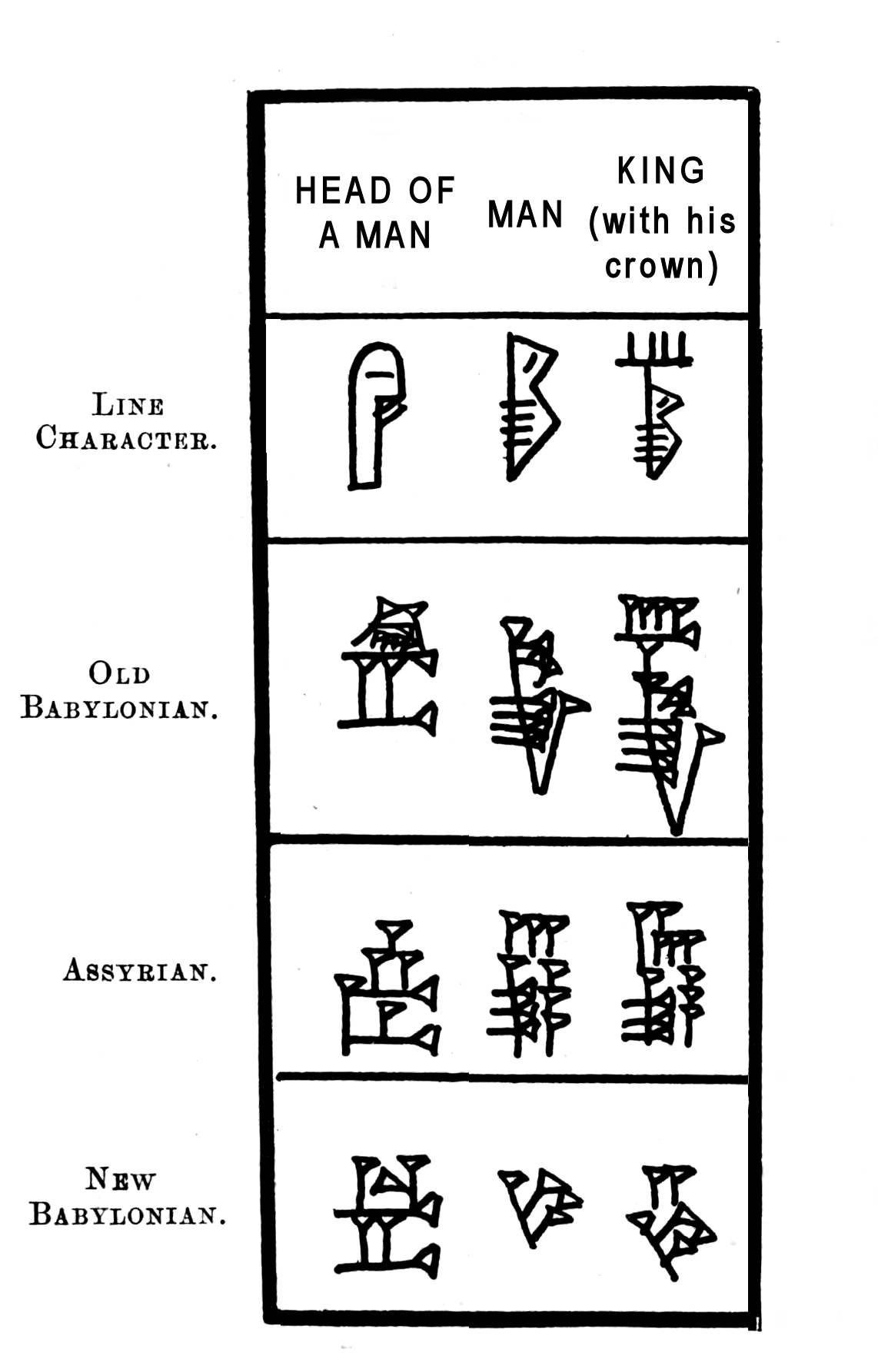
Evolution of anthropomorphic cuneiforms, Lugal appears in the right columns.

There are different theories regarding the meaning of the title lugal in 3rd-millennium Sumer. Some scholars believe that a ruler of an individual city-state was usually called ensi, and a ruler who headed a confederacy or larger dominion composed of several cities, perhaps even the whole of Sumer, was a lugal. The functions of such a lugal would include certain ceremonial and cultic activities, arbitration in border disputes, military defence against external enemies, and once the lugal has died, the eldest son must take over. The ensis of Lagash would sometimes refer to the city's patron deity, Ningirsu, as their lugal ("master"). All of the above is connected to the possibly priestly or sacral character of the titles ensi and especially en (the latter term continuing to designate priests in subsequent times).

Other scholars consider ensi, en and lugal to have been merely three local designations for the sovereign, accepted respectively in the city-states of Lagash, Uruk and Ur (as well as most of the rest of Sumer), although the various terms may have expressed different aspects of the Mesopotamian concept of kingship. A lugal at that time is assumed to have been "normally a young man of outstanding qualities from a rich landowning family". T. Jacobsen theorized that he was originally an (elected) war leader, as opposed to the (likewise elected) en, who dealt with internal issues.

Among the earliest rulers whose inscriptions describe them as lugals are Enmebaragesi and Mesilim at Kish, and Meskalamdug, Mesannepada and several of their successors at Ur. At least from the Third Dynasty of Ur onwards, only lugal was used to designate a contemporary sovereign in Sumerian.

== Lugal in the Amarna letters ==
The term Lugal is used extensively in the Amarna letters, for addressing kings or pharaohs, and elsewhere in speaking about various kings. One common address, in the introduction of many letters, from the vassals writing to the pharaoh was to use: Šàr-ri, (šarri "my king": šar the construct state of šarrum + the first person suffix -i); they used Lugal + ri = Šàr-ri, with LUGAL written Sumerographically while ri being the Akkadian phonetic supplement.

== See also ==
- Lugalbanda
