= Nahhunte =

Elamite sun god

Nahhunte was the Elamite sun god. While the evidence for the existence of temples dedicated to him and regular offerings is sparse, he is commonly attested in theophoric names, including these of members of Elamite royal families.

== Name and character ==
Multiple writings of the name are known. In Elamite documents, the attested forms include Nahhunte, Nahhute, Nahiti and ^{d}PÍR. Forms attested in Akkadian texts include Naḫḫude, Naḫunde, Nanḫunde, ^{d}UTU and, exclusively in theophoric names, -nande and -ḫundu.

According to Matthew Stolper, the name Nahhunte is a compound noun, but its precise etymology is impossible to ascertain. He proposes that it was a cognate, and possibly a homonym, of the Elamite word for the sun. In curse formulas, his name functioned as a metonym for the sun itself.

In texts from Susa, Haft Tepe and Malamir the name of the sun god was usually written logographically as ^{d}UTU and it is uncertain when it should be read as Nahhunte rather than Shamash. It is possible that in legal texts, when ^{d}UTU occurs next to Inshushinak, Ruhurater or Simut, the logogram should be read as Nahhunte.

== Worship ==
The oldest attestation of Nahhunte is the "Treaty of Naram-Sin of Akkad," in which the name is spelled as Nahiti. Nahhunte occurs as the fifth of the invoked divine witnesses, right before Inshushinak, and a number of further mentions of him are present in the text.

Nahhunte was worshiped mostly in the west of Elam, in the proximity of Susa, similar to deities such as Pinikir, Manzat, Lagamal, Adad and Shala, However, direct references to worship of Nahhunte are rare in known texts. For example, there is no evidence that oaths were sworn in his name, while offerings to him are not listed in any administrative texts. Many theophoric names invoking him are nonetheless known, as attested in Elamite texts, texts from Elam written in Akkadian, and in Mesopotamian texts written in Akkadian or Sumerian. Both men and women could bear Nahhunte names. Examples include kings Shutruk-Nahhunte and Kutir-Nahhunte, as well as Nahhunte-utu, wife of Shilhak-Inshushinak.

Attahushu, who reigned in the eighteenth century BCE, erected a statue dedicated to Nahhunte in a marketplace to make sure the prices will remain just.

An inscription of Shilhak-Inshushinak mentions Nahhunte, labeled as "lord who protects," after Inshushinak, Kiririsha, Humban and Nannar, the last of these deities being a name of the Elamite moon god derived from Mesopotamian Nanna. The same king used the unique title "servant of Nahhunte, beloved of Inshushinak."

A shrine of Nahhunte existed in the temple complex built by Untash-Napirisha at Chogha Zanbil. It housed a golden statue of the god, according to an inscription from the site dedicated jointly to Nahhunte and the Mesopotamian moon god Sin. He was also worshiped in Gisat, a settlement most likely located in the Fahliyan region, though the local sanctuary was dedicated to multiple deities, including Napirisha. Nahhunte is listed among various other deities in what is assumed to be cursing or blessing formulae in a neo-Elamite document from this location.

Nah, mentioned in the Persepolis Fortification Archives, might be the same deity as Nahhunte according to Wouter Henkelman.

== Mesopotamian reception ==
While the Mesopotamian god list An = Anum does mention Nahhunte, he is not explicitly listed as a counterpart of the sun god, Utu/Shamash, but only as a member of a group called the "Divine Seven of Elam," associated with the goddess Narundi.

He is also present in two incantations, in one as a deity connected with childbirth and in another possibly as a demon. Additionally, a commentary on the former text erroneously identifies him as a moon god and Narundi as a sun deity, explaining their names as, respectively, Sin and Shamash.
