= Jabru =

Elamite god

Jabru was a god who according to Mesopotamian god lists was worshiped in Elam. However, he is not attested in any Elamite sources.

== Mesopotamian attestations ==
While Jabru is described as an Elamite god, he is known exclusively from Mesopotamian texts, and attestations of him are infrequent. An Elamite town named Jabru did exist, but according to the Assyrian Tākultu text its tutelary deity was a goddess named Jabrītu. It was located close to the border of Elam and Babylonia, and appears in an inscription of Amar-Sin mentioning it was destroyed alongside Huhnur, presumed to be the cult center of Ruhurater.

According to a Šurpu commentary, Jabru was the Elamite equivalent of the Mesopotamian god representing the sky, Anu. However, according to the god list An = Anum, a god bearing the name Yabnu (^{d}ia-ab-na) was instead the "Enlil of Elam". Wilfred G. Lambert concludes that both of these theonyms are variant spellings of the same name.

In an Assyrian text known as the Underworld Vision of an Assyrian Prince (VAT 10057), Jabru is mentioned as one of the three gods guarding the corpse of a king, the other two being Humban and Napirisha. Alexandre Lokotionov notes that this sequence of gods mirrors the reference to Jabru in Šurpu, and that its inclusion possibly indicates that to the Assyrians the underworld "could have simply been a repository for the exotic and the unusual."

== Speculative identification ==
Due to his presumed similarity to Anu, Heidemarie Koch speculates that Jabru was the father of Humban, who was sometimes equated by Mesopotamians with Enlil, much like how Anu could be viewed as Enlil's father. However, in at least one source Jabru was equated with Enlil rather than Anu.

Koch also proposed that the Elamite word tepti ("lord"; sometimes written with the so-called divine determinative) might be a title or taboo name of Jabru used as a theophoric element of personal names. However, the theory about some Elamite gods being merely taboo names for others (Kiririsha for Pinikir, Napirisha for Humban) is generally rejected in recent scholarship, and Wouter Henkelman in a more recent publication refers to Koch's assumption as speculative.
