= Pinikir =

Elamite and Hurrian astral goddess

- Elamite and Hurrian astral goddess
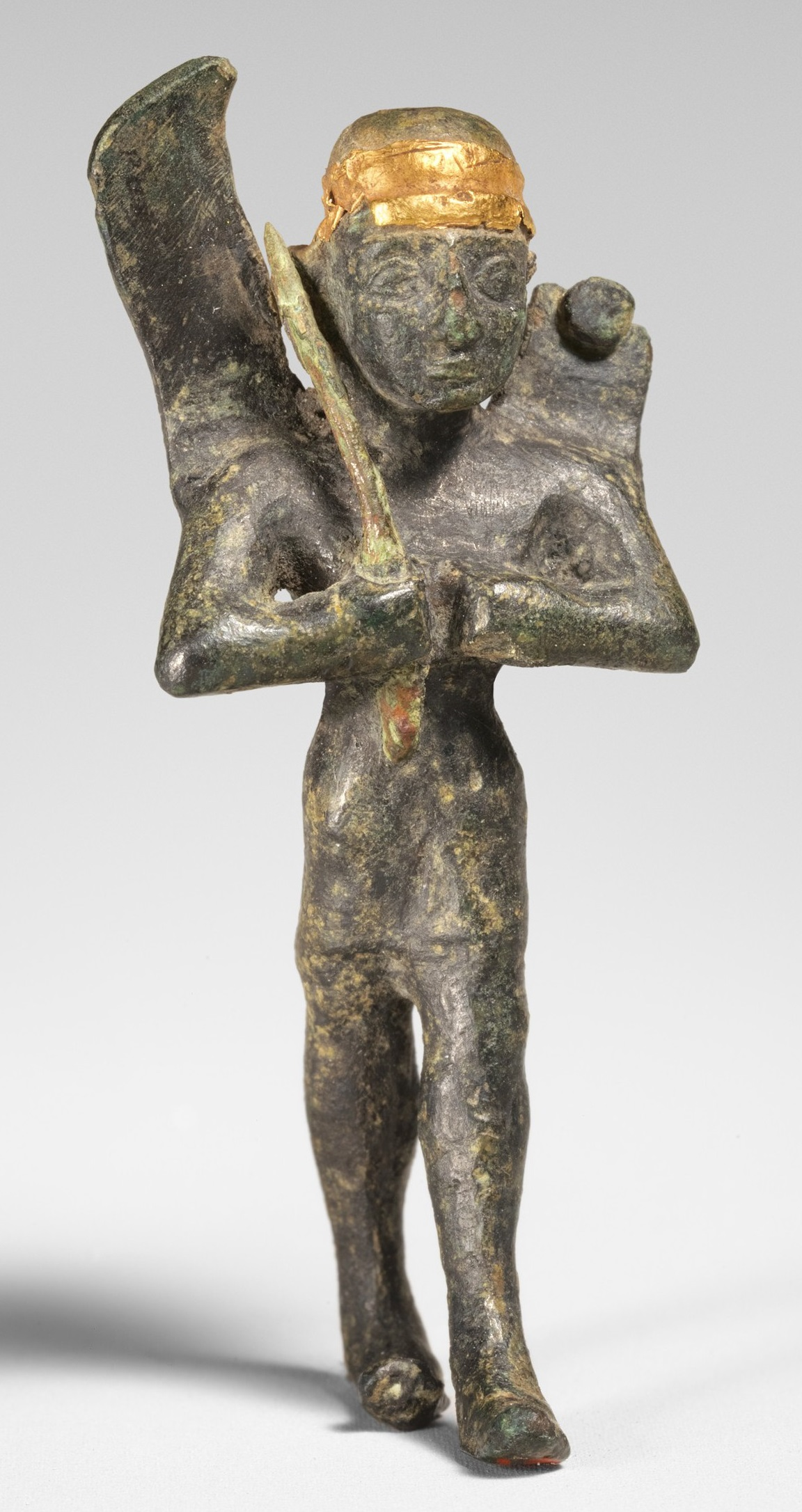
- A small bronze figurine of a winged deity, most likely Pinikir, dated to the fourteenth or thirteenth century BCE
- Major cult center: Susa, Awan, Chogha Zanbil, Samuha, the Yazılıkaya sanctuary
- Symbol: star

Genealogy
- Parents: Sin and Ningal (in only one text, due to syncretism with Ishtar)
- Siblings: Shamash (as above)

Equivalents
- Mesopotamian: Ishtar, Ninsianna
- Syrian: possibly Ashtart

Pinikir, also known as Pinigir, Pirengir, Pirinkir, and Parakaras, was an Ancient Near Eastern astral goddess who originates in Elamite religious beliefs. While she is only infrequently attested in Elamite documents, she achieved a degree of prominence in Hurrian religion. Due to her presence in pantheons of many parts of the Ancient Near East, from Anatolia to Iran, modern researchers refer to her as a "cosmopolitan deity."

Early scholarship incorrectly identified her as one and the same as Kiririsha, an unrelated goddess from a different part of Elam.

== Name ==
Wilfred G. Lambert considered Pinikir's origin to be Elamite.

Hittitologist Gary Beckman proposes that Pinikir’s name has Sumerian origin and has been derived from pirig.gal, "great feline." However, according to Piotr Taracha, this proposal cannot be proven conclusively. While it was assumed in the past that a deity named Pirig-gal appears in the inscriptions of the Hurrian king Tish-atal of Urkesh, subsequent research has shown that this was a misreading and the name inscribed is actually that of Nergal. John MacGinnis argues that a deity named Pirig-gal, attested in an inscription of Esarhaddon, can be identified as Pinikir nonetheless.

Multiple spellings are attested both in Elamite (Pi-ni-gir, Bi-ni-gir, Bi-ne-en-gi-ir, Pi-in-gi-ir-ra) and Hurro-Hittite (Pi-ri-in-kir, Pi-re-en-kir, Pi-ri-kir, Pi-ri-ki-ir, Pi-ri-in-ki-ir) sources. It is possible that some of the latter were read as “Piriggir.” In the Yazılıkaya sanctuary, Pinikir’s name is spelled in hieroglyphs as PURUS+ra/i.

== Character and iconography ==
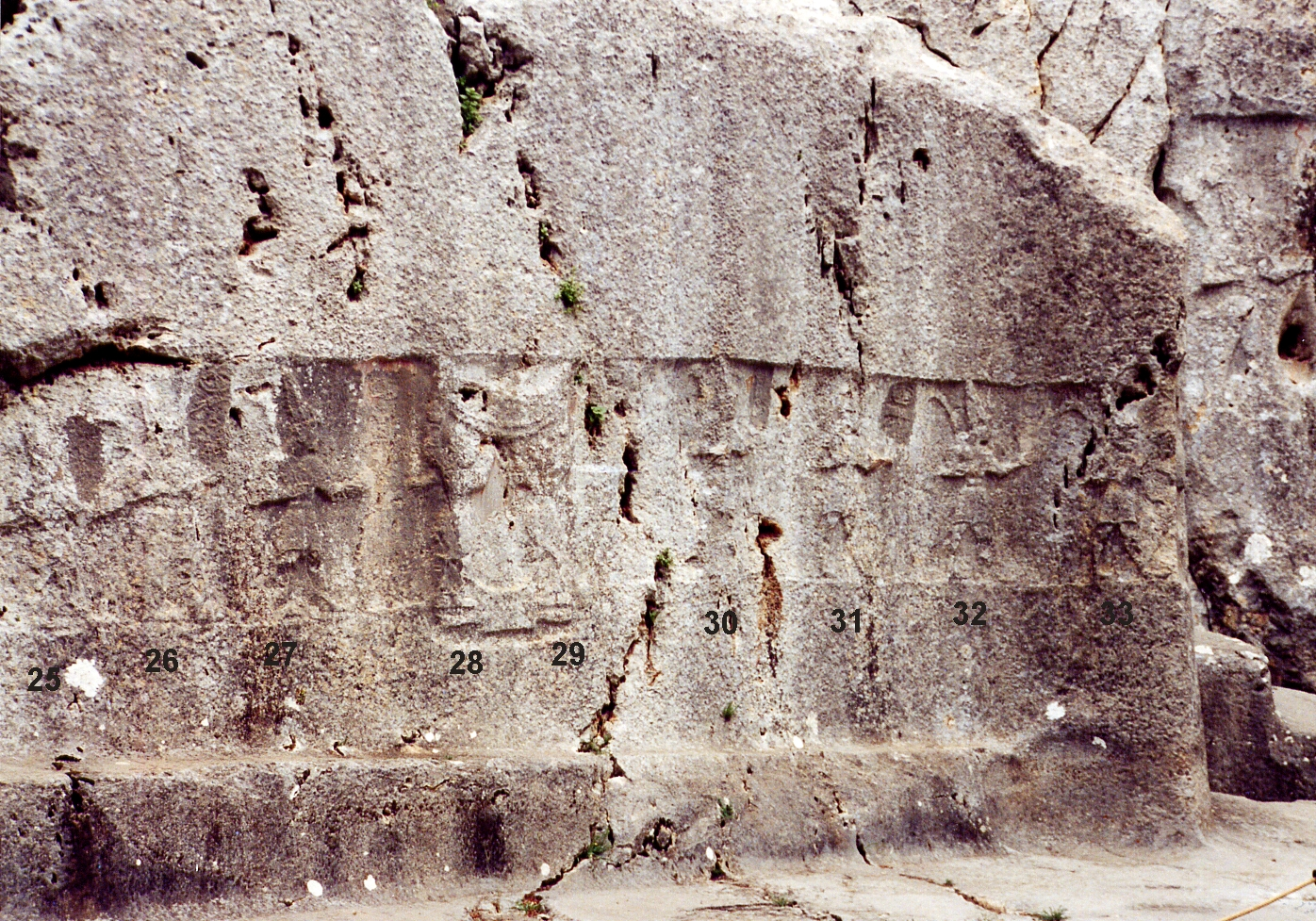
Pinikir (figure 31) in a procession of gods, as depicted on the Yazılıkaya reliefs

Pinikir was an astral deity, possibly a divine representation of the planet Venus. In Elam, she was known as kikki galirra 'mistress of heaven'. According to Kamyar Abdi, in the Elamite context, she was additionally considered the goddess of love and sex.

Based on a bronze plaque from Susa depicting a procession of warrior deities and inscribed with names of various Elamite deities, including Pinikir (but also Kiririsha, Lagamal, Nahhunte and Manzat) Kamyar Abdi argues that Pinikir was viewed as a warrior goddess in Elam. Javier Álvarez-Mon of Macquarie University interprets the deities depicted as male and as "a version of (highland) Elamite Sebitti" instead. It has also been proposed that the figures might be deified kings. Pinikir was additionally seemingly associated with warfare, and especially with war horses, at least in Hurro-Hittite context.

In Hurrian sources, Pinikir’s gender varies. An example of masculine Pinikir can be found on the reliefs in Yazılıkaya, where the deity is depicted as winged, similarly to the masculine form of Šauška (another Hurrian deity whose gender shows some ambiguity) and the moon god Kušuḫ. The masculine Pinikir is also depicted in a type of skullcap associated with the sun god Šimige and with mortal kings. The similarity to iconography of solar and lunar gods highlights the deity’s celestial character.

Pinikir was sometimes represented symbolically as a disc.

== Association with other deities ==
Pinikir was closely associated with Ishtar. In a text written in Akkadian but found in a corpus of Hurro-Hittite rituals Pinikir’s name is written logographically as ^{d}IŠTAR, and Sin, Ningal and Shamash appear as her parents and twin brother, respectively. Both in this text and at least one more source her sukkal (attendant deity) is Ilabrat/Ninshubur. Daniel T. Potts additionally proposed in 1981 that it is possible that due to an association between Pinikir and Ishtar the former's possible consort (a role he assigns to Humban) would have acquired Tammuz-like traits but concludes himself that this is "pure speculation."

A god list from Emar equates Pinikir with Ninsianna, a Mesopotamian goddess representing the planet Venus. Ninsianna in turn was also identified as ^{d}IŠTAR.MUL ("Ishtar of the star"), which indicates that Pinikir was likely also viewed as a celestial body. Ninsianna’s gender varies between sources, similar to Pinikir's in Hurrian texts.

In Hurrian sources Pinikir frequently appears alongside so-called "Goddess of the Night." They are regarded as a dyad in scholarship. The worship of pairs of goddesses with similar domains (for example Ishara and Allani, Hutena and Hutellura, Ninatta and Kulitta) as dyads was a common feature of Hurrian religion.

Gary Beckman notes that Pinikir's association with war horses in Hurro-Hittite sources is similar to that between Ashtart and the same animals, documented in sources from Egypt and Syria, and proposes a connection existed between these two deities.

== Worship ==
=== In Elam ===
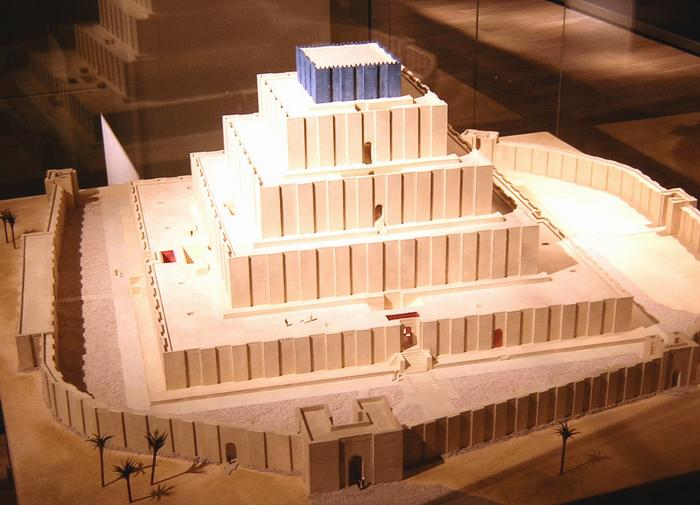
A modern reconstruction of Chogha Zanbil, where Pinikir was worshiped

Pinikir is generally regarded as part of the pantheon of western Elam, similar to deities like Manzat and Lagamar. Locations associated with her include Susa and Awan. However, classification of specific deities as “Awanite” presently depends entirely on theories about the "Treaty of Naram-Sin of Akkad." The other signatory is commonly assumed to be king Khita of Awan, and therefore it has been proposed that the first deities invoked - Pinikir and Humban - originate in the area under his rule.

Pinikir is attested for the first time in the aforementioned document alongside many other deities worshiped in Elam, such as Humban, Manzat (whose origin was Akkadian) and Simut. She is the first of thirty seven the deities listed as divine witnesses, which lead a number of researchers in the past to assume she was originally the principal deity of Elam. However, this theory is now regarded as lacking evidence.

Pinikir rarely appears in Elamite theophoric names. A daughter of king Shilhak-Inshushinak, Utu-ehihhi-Pinigir, was nonetheless named in her honor.

During the reign of Untash-Napirisha (c. 1275-1240 BCE) a temple of Pinikir had been built in Dur-Untash (Chogha Zanbil) near the ziggurat. The king donated a golden statue of the goddess to it. The temple was located to the right of the royal entrance to the structure, followed by these dedicated to Adad (whose name was represented in inscriptions logographically as ^{d}IM), Shala, Simut and Belet Ali ("Lady of the City," possibly an epithet of Manzat), and the Napratep gods. Excavations of Pinikir's temple revealed a number of frit vessels shaped like female heads.

Untash-Napirisha also built an aštam of Pinikir. This term, possibly a loanword from Akkadian aštammu (tavern) is understood as an “endowed tavern” by Kamyar Abdi, but as a type of regular temple by Florence Malbran-Labat. Wouter Henkelman proposes that it was a siyan husame, a so-called "temple in the grove." Daniel T. Potts notes that in Elamite sources the term aštam appears to only designate temples of Pinikir.

At least two neo-Elamite kings were particularly dedicated to Pinikir: Shutruk-Nahhunte II (reigned c. 717-699 BCE) and Tepti-Humban-Inshusinak (reigned either c. 660 or c. 520 BCE). The latter built a temple dedicated to her after a victory over balahuteppe and lallarippe. Wouter Henkelman considers these to be generic collective terms for evildoers or enemies rather than proper names, but Daniel T. Potts assumes they refer to specific groups. Four inscriptions from Susa state that during Tepti-Humban-Inshushinak's reign work had been undertaken on temples of Pinikir and Inshushinak located in that city. The king Shutur-Nahhunte also built a new temple of Pinikir in the same city out of glazed bricks. During Ashurbanipal’s sack of Susa a temple of Pinikir had been plundered before being razed to the ground.

=== In Syria and Anatolia ===
In addition to her presence in Elam, Pinikir was also worshiped by the Hurrians. According to Alfonso Archi, she “occupied a position of certain importance” in the Hurrian pantheon. She was invoked as "Lady of the Lands," "Lady of Gods and Kings," "Queen of Heaven" and also simply as "Elamite goddess." She could also be referred to with the epithet allai, "lady," the Hurrian equivalent of Sumerian gašan and Akkadian bēltu. Other Hurrian goddesses, for example Hebat or Shaushka, could be referred to as allai too. Additionally, it was the origin of the name of the goddess of the underworld, Allani.

Piotr Taracha considers her to be one of the deities received by the Hurrians from Mesopotamia, possibly as early as in the third millennium BCE, alongside the likes of Ea and Ningal. Gary Beckman on linguistic grounds assumes that it is improbable that she was received directly from Elam. He also proposes that forerunners to late Bronze Age rituals dedicated to Hurrian deities like Pinikir, the "Goddess of the Night" (DINGIR.GE_{6}), Kumarbi and the "former gods" (karuileš šiuneš) likely arose in the "Sumero-Hurrian culture of the late third and early second millennium." Records of relations between Mesopotamian (for example Third Dynasty of Ur) and Hurrian (for example Nineveh, Urkesh, Nagar) polities in that time period show interchange of religious ideas. While there is presently no evidence for the worship of Elamite deities on the court of the Third Dynasty of Ur (despite the presence of Hurrian ones, as well as deities from the Upper Euphrates and Diyala areas), a considerable number of Elamites are attested in the records too. Additionally, there is evidence that kings of Ur showed interest in the temples of Elamite deities: Inshushinak's in Susa (Shulgi) and Ruhurater's in Huhnur (Amar-Sin). It has also been noted that Hurro-Hittite ritual texts preserve knowledge about Pinikir’s association with Susa, which was likely derived from older Mesopotamian scholarly literature.

In one Hurrian offering list (KUB 34.102), Pinikir appears among the deities from the circle of Teshub, alongside "Ishtar of Heaven," Allani, Ḫešui (a war god) and Iršappa.

The Hittites adopted Pinikir from the Hurrians in the Middle Hittite period. Other Hurrian Ishtar-like deities, such as Shaushka, entered the Hittite pantheon at the same time. Invocations of "all Ishtars of the land of Hurri" are known from Hittite sources. No deity of this variety played a significant role in the Old Hittite period, and their presence is a sign of Hurrian influence. None of them were associated with the oldest Hittite centers, such as Nerik, Ankuwa or Zippalanda.

A Hittite ritual texts (CTH 644) associates Pinikir with horses, presumably specifically these meant to draw war chariots. She is also the deity invoked in a series of Hittite incantations, so-called babilili rituals, named after the language they’re written in, Akkadian (called babilili in the Hittite commentary). While Hittite ritual texts often feature invocations in foreign languages, such as Hurrian, Hattian, Luwian and Palaic, Akkadian is used in them very rarely, with only the babilili incantations and a so-called "ritual against insomnia" (CTH 432) featuring longer Akkadian sections. Due to a number of linguistic peculiarities it is possible that the texts were copied from presently unknown compositions compiled in a peripheral area of Mesopotamia in the Old Babylonian period.

Rituals dedicated to Pinikir often took place at night. She also often appears in texts alongside the Hurrian "Goddess of the Night," for example in the text CTH 481 she received a keldi (so-called "goodwill offering") on the roof of the latter deity's temple, while in a variety of fragmentary damaged texts references are made to a purification ritual invoking them both. The association between them is particularly evident in texts from Samuha, where Pinikir was worshiped in the temple of the "Goddess of the Night."

A Hittite text describes a vow to Shaushka made by queen Puduhepa, in which some cultic utensils of Pinikir are mentioned.

Gary Beckman argues that Pinikir occurs in a single alphabetic Ugaritic ritual text, written as prgl. This attestation is however regarded as uncertain by Piotr Taracha.

In Carchemish Pinikir maintained a degree of relevance at least until the middle of the ninth century BCE. In a Luwian curse formula from this city Pinikir (“Parakaras”) appears alongside Tarhunza, Karhuha, Kubaba, the moon and the sun.

A theophoric name beginning with the divine name Pirengir (Pinikir) is attested on an administrative tablet of neo-Assyrian provenance found in Tushhan (modern Ziyaret Tepe). While due to its incomplete preservation the linguistic affinity of the bearer is unknown, multiple individuals bearing Hurrian names are attested from this location, while none have been identified as Elamite. The phraseology of the text in mention indicates the people listed in it might have been deportees from other parts of the Assyrian empire.

Inscriptions of Esarhaddon mention that he ordered the king of Shupria to round up Assyrian fugitives in the temple of a deity named Pirig-gal. John MacGinnis identifies this deity as Pinikir. It is possible that the Shuprians were related to Hurrians, though it is far from certain and this guess is only based on a handful of names of kings.

== Disproved theories ==
Walther Hinz, an early researcher of Elam, believed that Pinikir was one and the same as Kiririsha, and that the latter was merely a "taboo name". The theory of Elamite divine "taboo names" in general and specifically of the alleged equivalence between Pinikir and Kiririsha (and between Humban and Napirisha) is considered discredited by modern researchers of Elamite religion such as Wouter Henkelman and François Vallat. Kiririsha and Pinikir have their origin in pantheons of different parts of Elam (Liyan and Awan, respectively), were worshiped separately at Chogha Zanbil, and both appear in an inscription accompanying a bronze relief from Susa. Additionally, while Pinikir is compared both in ancient texts and in modern scholarship to Ishtar, Kiririsha is instead regarded as similar to Ninhursag.

The view that Pinikir and Kirirsha were one deity, pioneered by Hinz, lead to the formation of a theory that Pinikir was a mother goddess. However, the title "mother of gods" is only attested for Kiririsha and Mashti. Heidemarie Koch, who accepts many of Hinz's assumptions about Elamite religion, concludes that Pinikir at most could have absorbed the maternal traits of other deities.

Hinz also asserted that Pinikir was originally the main deity of Elam, but there is no evidence for that outside of her position in the Naram-Sin treaty, and she is attested very infrequently in known Elamite texts. It has also been pointed out that the deities in the Naram-Sin treaty are not necessarily arranged according to theological importance. For instance, while Humban is listed as second and Inshushinak only as sixth, the latter is subsequently invoked multiple times while the former is not, possibly indicating greater significance.
