= Simut (god) =

Elamite herald of the gods

- Herald of the gods
- Planet: Mars

Genealogy
- Spouse: Manzat, Raqadu

Equivalents
- Mesopotamian: Nergal

Simut or Šimut (Shimut) was an Elamite god. He was regarded as the herald of the gods, and was associated with the planet Mars. He was closely associated with Manzat, a goddess representing the rainbow. He appears in inscriptions of various Elamite kings which mention a number of temples dedicated to him. However, it is not known which city served as his main cult center. He was also worshiped in Mesopotamia, where he was compared with the war god Nergal.

== Name ==
Various spellings of Simut's name are attested in Elamite sources, including phonetic ^{d}Si-mu-ut, ^{d}Ši-mu-ut-ta, ^{d}Ši-mu-ut and ^{d}Ši-mut, as well as logographic ^{d}MAN/^{d}PAP. The last spelling might be related to one of the Mesopotamian names of theplanet Mars, ^{mul}MAN-ma, "the strange star". It is also possible that in at least one location another logographic spelling of his name was NIN.DAR.(A).

The romanization "Simut" reflects the standard spelling of this theonym in Mesopotamian sources from the Middle Babylonian period, though in earlier, Old Babylonian ones, Šimut (Shimut) appears to be the correct orthography. In neo-Assyrian sources, the name is spelled as "Šumudu" (Shumudu).

== Character ==
Simut was known as "god of Elam", "herald of the gods" (Elamiteberir napirra) and "mighty one, herald of the gods" (silhak perir nappipir). It is possible that he was a warrior god, and that the word tentatively translated as "herald" refers to a specific administrative or military position. Like Humban, Simut was associated with the concept of kittin, which can be understood as "(area of) divine protection." He appears in judicial and economic documents from Susa, in at least one case sharing the role of a divine witness and guardian of contracts with Inshushinak and the Mesopotamian sun Shamash.

Simut was frequently associated with the planet Mars in Babylonian astrological texts, and the planet was often called "the star Simut", ^{mul}Si-mu-ut.

While Wilfred G. Lambert describes Simut as an "infernal" god in the Reallexikon der Assyriologie und Vorderasiatischen Archäologie, Daniel T. Potts, following the more recent research of Wouter Henekelman, concludes that he had no funerary or underworld associations.

== Associations with other deities ==
In Elam Simut was likely viewed as the husband of Manzat, a goddess regarded as the divine representation of the rainbow. He was also associated with Belet-ali (Akkadian: "lady of the city"), a goddess most likely analogous to Manzat. According to Wouter Henkelman the deity NIN.DAR.A, who appears with Manzat in some inscriptions, can also be identified with Simut. However, Daniel T. Potts identifies NIN.DAR.A as a goddess. The name Nindara or Nindar originally belonged to a male Mesopotamian deity, the husband of the goddess Nanshe, who was worshiped in Lagash, Girsu and Ki'esa.

In Mesopotamia Simut was frequently associated with Nergal and shared his association with Mars and possibly his warlike character, though unlike him he was not an underworld deity. The two of them are equated in a multi column edition of the Weidner god list. In another version of this text he appears alongside Laṣ, the wife of Nergal. In a variant discovered in Ugarit, a deity named Raqadu appears instead of Laṣ, and according to Manfred Krebernik it is possible to identify her as Simut's spouse.

Wouter Henkelman proposes that "Nergal of Hubshal" (or Hubshan), a deity known from Assyrian sources, can be identified Simut. However, Volkert Haas instead suggested that this title referred to Ugur. Hubshan was an area associated with the worship of Manzat, Simut's presumed wife, according to Elamite royal inscriptions. It is presently unknown if "Aya of Hubshen" known from the same Assyrian sources as Nergal of Hubshen is related in any way to Manzat.

Stephanie Dalley proposes that Mesopotamians might have associated Simut with Ishum due to their shared role as heralds of the gods in the respective pantheons.

== Worship ==
Like many other gods worshiped in Elam, for example Pinikir, Humban and Manzat, Simut is attested for the first time in the treaty of Naram-Sin with an unknown Elamite monarch, possibly Hita of Awan, where he appears after Inshushinak. Old Babylonian copies of earlier inscriptions also mention a governor (ensi) of Elam from the Sargonic period bearing the theophoric name Sanam-Shimut. Other historically notable Elamites bearing theophoric names invoking Simut include Kuk-Simut, chancellor of king Tan-Ruhurater of the Shimashki dynasty, and Simut-wartash from the Sukkalmah period, whose inscriptions were found in Liyan on the coast of the Persian Gulf.

While it is assumed Simut had a main cult center, similar to how Inshushinak was associated with Susa, Ruhurater with Huhnur and Napirisha with Anshan, its name and location are presently unknown. Multiple temples dedicated to him are attested in Elamite texts, for example Untash-Napirisha dedicated houses of worship in Susa and Chogha Zanbil to him. The latter one was shared with the goddess Belet-ali. It was referred to with the term kinin, a hapax legomenon variously translated in modern literature as "gate", "lock", "fate" or "(divine) help", According to inscriptions of kings Shutruk-Nahhunte and Hutelutush-Inshushinak sites of worship of Manzat and Simut treated as a pair existed in Susa. A temple in Anshan was dedicated jointly to Simut, Kiririsha, Napirisha and Inshushinak. It was built during the reign of Hutelutush-Inshushinak.

The Neo-Elamite ruler Hanni of Ayapir left behind an inscription dedicated to Humban, Tepti, Napir and Simut.

Worship of Simut continued in the former Elamite territory under the rule of the Persian Achaemenid dynasty, and he is attested in the so-called Persepolis fortification archive. According to one of these texts, a priest named Appirka received wine from the royal administration to offer it to Simut, Ahura Mazda and Mithra, which indicates that Elamite and Iranian deities were worshiped side by side in this period. At least one theophoric name invoking Simut, Shati-Shimut, appears in this corpus of texts.

=== Mesopotamian reception ===
The oldest attestations of the worship of Simut in Mesopotamia are theophoric names from the Old Babylonian period, with the oldest identified in texts dated to the reign of Rim-Sîn I of Larsa.

Stephanie Dalley argues that it is possible that Simut had a minor cult center somewhere in Mesopotamia, in parallel with how another Elamite deity worshiped there and attested in theophoric names, Igishta (^{d}IGI.DU; Igišta) had one in Udannu, a small settlement near Uruk.

Multiple theophoric names indicate that Simut was among the deities present in the pantheon of the First Sealand dynasty, possibly in association with Manzat. Feminine names are among them, for example Amat-Šimut. Some of these names, as well as other given names from the same area, combine Akkadian and Elamite elements, but according to Ran Zadok it is difficult to speculate about the identity of their bearers.

Nine theophoric names invoking Simut have been identified in texts from Nippur from the Kassite period. He might also be present in an earlier Nippur god list, but this attestation is uncertain.
