= Humban-Numena =

King of Elam
- Reign: c. 1370 BC
- Predecessor: Attar-kittah
- Successor: Untash-Napirisha
- Issue: Untash-Napirisha
- Father: Attar-kittah

Humban-Numena (or Kumban-Numena; fl. c. 1370 BC) was a king of Elam from the Igihalkid dynasty (Middle Elamite Period). He was a son and successor of King Attar-kittah. (Note: As attested in his inscriptions from temples in Liyan and in Susa.) He married a daughter of the Kassite king Kurigalzu II, who bore him Untash-Napirisha, (Note: He is mentioned as the father of King Untash-Napirisha in a later inscription of King Shilhak-Inshushinak and in the so-called Berlin letter, a Neo-Babylonian copy of a diplomatic letter sent from Elam to Babylon, where it is also recorded that his mother was the daughter of Kurigalzu) who was thus a grandson of Kurigalzu. According to another interpretation of the primary source, he married the daughter of his uncle Pahir-ishshan, himself the son of a Kassite princess, and was thus a great-grandson of Kurigalzu.

== See also ==
- Humbaba
- Khumban
