= Humban =

Elamite and Persian god

- Divine bestower of kingship
- Major cult center: Awan (disputed)

Equivalents
- Mesopotamian: Enlil

Humban (Elamite: 𒀭𒃲𒈨𒌍, romanized: Humban, ^{d}hu-um-ban, also ^{d}hu-ban, Huban) was an Elamite god. He is already attested in the earliest sources preserving information about Elamite religion, but seemingly only grew in importance in the neo-Elamite period, in which many kings had theophoric names invoking him. He was connected with the concept of kitin, or divine protection.

Due to his role in religion of the neo-Elamite person, he was also worshiped by the earliest Persian rulers from the Achaemenid dynasty, as indicated by the Persepolis Administrative Archives, where he is mentioned more often even than Ahura Mazda.

== Character ==
It is likely that while in the west of Elam Inshushinak was regarded as the head of the pantheon, further east the position of Humban was higher. At the same time, with the exception of documents from the Acheamenid period, Humban does not appear in texts discovered further east than Izeh in Khuzestan. According to Wouter Henkelman, this indicates that what is referred to as "Elamite religion" in scholarship was most likely a "patchwork of local traditions".

Humban could be called rišar nappipir, "greatest of the gods" or "great among the gods", though this epithet was also applied to Inshushinak. An inscription of Hanni of Ayapir calls him rišar nappirra, "greatest god". Another of his epithets might have been elume, possibly a loan from Akkadian elû ("high", "exalted"), but it is unclear if a passage in which it is attested should be interpreted as referring to the god as "Humban the Exalted", or if it instead denotes the location of his temple.

Humban's supremacy over other gods could be acknowledged in temples not dedicated to him, for example it is presumed that the Ayapir sanctuary from which the rišar nappirra epithet is known was most likely dedicated to the local god Tirutur, rather than Humban.

=== Kitin ===
Humban was believed to bestow kitin upon rulers. The term is often translated as "divine protection", but its meaning was most likely more broad, and in individual sources it might designate concepts such as "god-given royal power", "divinely-enforced legal protection", "legal authority", "legal order" or even "divine emblem". Other gods were believed to bestow it too, for example Inshushinak, Tepti and Tirutur, but the kitin of Humban was regarded as the most important for the kings in the Neo-Elamite period.

It is not clear when Humban became a god associated with kingship, but it might have been a theological innovation of the Neo-Elamite period. Similarly, the term kitin is largely limited to administrative texts in earlier periods, and only starts to appear in royal inscriptions in Neo-Elamite times. In personal names, its use prior to this period is limited to sources from Malyan.

A single mention of kitin occurs in the "Daivā Inscription" of Xerxes I, though only in the Elamite version, not the accompanying Akkadian and Persian ones.

== Worship ==
Oldest attestation of Humban is the Treaty of Naram-Sin of Akkad, whose signatories were the Akkadian ruler in mention (reigned 2260-2223 BCE) and an unknown Elamite monarch, often assumed to be Khita of Awan, though definite evidence is lacking. Humban occupies the second place among the deities listed as witnesses, behind Pinikir. His name is written as ^{d}hu-ba-an in this document. The other divine witnesses enumerated include deities of both Elamite (for example Simut and Hutran) and western (Ilaba, Ishara, Manzat, Ninkarrak, Ninurta) origin. The treaty has been used as evidence of Humban being a god originating in Awan, or already occupying an important position in the "Awanite" pantheon in the third millennium BCE, but Wouter Henkelman suggests that caution is necessary, as he is only mentioned once in this document, while Inshushinak, who on the account of being the tutelary god of Susa would not necessarily play a major role in Awan, is mentioned six times.

A text from Susa roughly contemporary with the Naram-Sin treaty mentions a day during which grain was offered to Humban, though it does not specify where did it take place. In the following Sukkalmah period, the only evidence of the worship of Humban are theophoric names in administrative texts, such as Kuk-Humban.

In the Middle Elamite period (second half of the second millennium BCE), king Untash-Napirisha built a temple of Humban at Chogha Zanbil. Humban also appears in the inscription from a stele of king Shilhak-Inshushinak I, in which he occupies the fourth place among the gods listed, after Napirisha, Kiririsha and Inshushinak. The same king also rebuilt a "residence" (murti) of Humban.

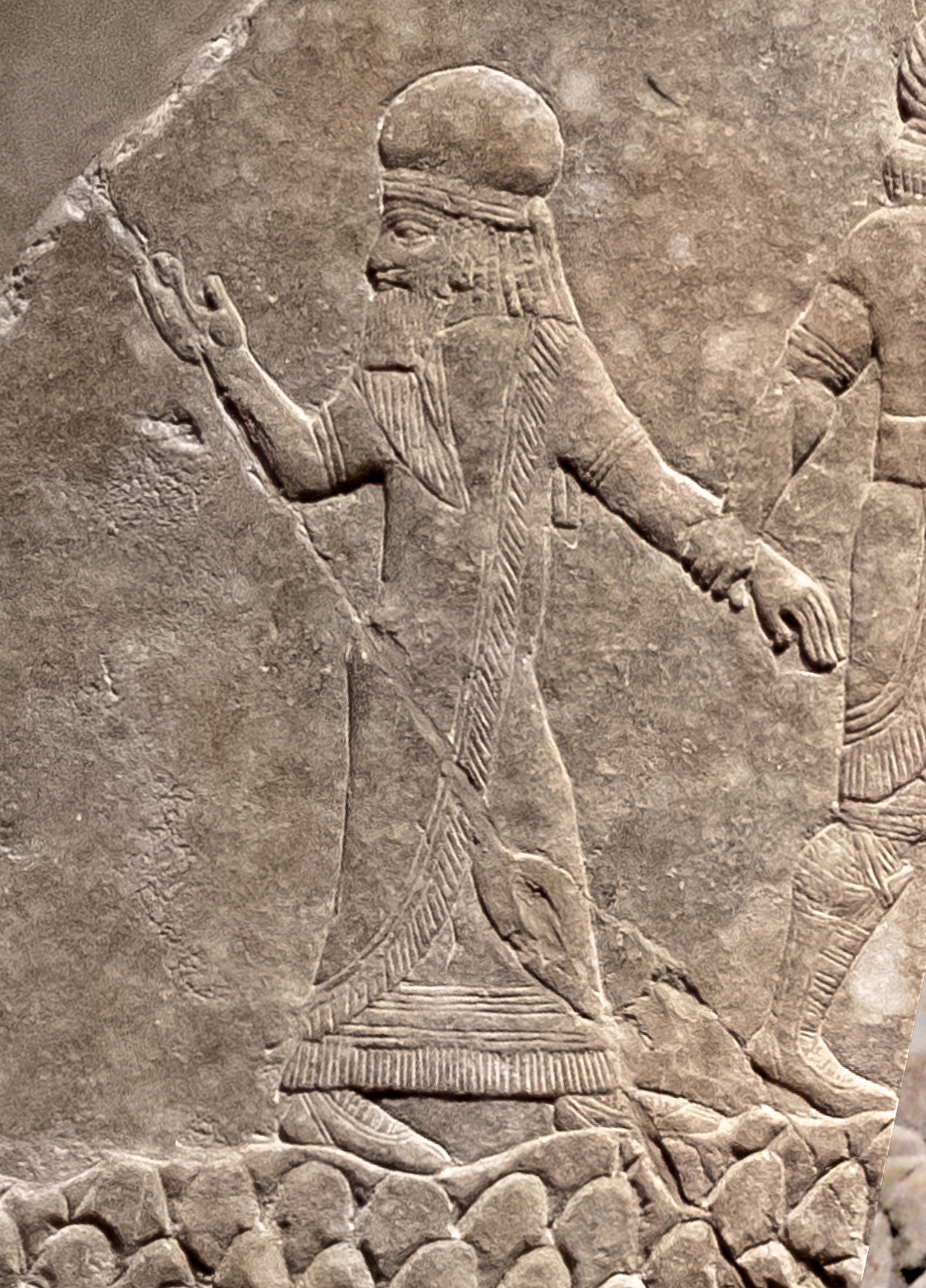
Assyrian relief depicting the capture of king Humban-haltash III.

The popularity of Humban seemingly increased in the Neo-Elamite period, as indicated by the high number of theophoric names invoking him. At least thirteen Neo-Elamite kings or claimants to the throne, roughly a half of Elamite rulers from this period, bore such names. Examples include Humban-haltash III and Tepti-Humban-Inshushinak. For comparison, only two are attested from earlier times, namely Huba-simti from the Sargonic period and Humban-Numena, who reigned around 1350 BCE. Neo-Elamite rulers whose inscriptions mention Humban include Hanni of Ayapir, Tepti-Humban-Inshushinak, and possibly Atta-hamiti-Inshushinak. An inscription of Tepti-Humban-Inshushinak indicates that among the clergy of Humban in his times there was a high priestess.

A number of Elamite topographical names invoked Humban, for example Til Humba, "hill of Humban", located near the western border of Elam, or the town Zila-Humban located in the Fahliyan area, possibly near Kurangun.

=== Achaemenid reception ===
In the Persepolis fortification archive, Humban appears more commonly than any other Elamite or Persian deity, with a total of twenty six mentions (for comparison, Auramazdā, the Old Persian form of Ahura Mazda, appears only ten times). It has been argued that in this period, he should be regarded as a Persian god, rather than a strictly Elamite one. Overall he received the most offerings of all deities attested in textual sources.The amount of grain offered to him by the Achaemenid administration was more than thrice as big as that offered to Auramazdā. Offerings to him are designated as bakadaušiyam in multiple cases. This term, while Elamite, is a loan from Old Persian, and can be translated as "(feast) of the offering to (a) god". It accordingly likely designated a public feast. Similar celebrations are attested only for a small number of other deities. Wouter Henkelman suggests that the references to bakadaušiyam of Humban are therefore likely to reflect his popularity and status as a royal god.

Mary Boyce went as far as suggesting that the prominence of Humban in the Neo-Elamite period influenced the position of Ahura Mazda in later religious traditions of the Persians, but Henkelman considers this proposal to be entirely speculative. It is nonetheless plausible that the concept of kitin, associated with the Neo-Elamite period with Humban, was later assigned to Ahura Mazda, as indicated by an inscription of Xerxes using this term. Ahura Mazda's role as a divine kingmaker was also likely modeled on Humban's.

Most of the nineteen priests (eight of them designated as šatin) of Humban known from Achaemenid documents bear linguistically Iranian, rather than Elamite, names (for example Mardunuya and Yama), and the percentage of the latter type of names among them is similar to the ten percent attested among the general populace. Humban could receive offerings alongside gods of various cultural backgrounds, including Ahura Mazda and Adad.

Most locations where Humban was worshiped in the Achemenid period were towns located close to the royal road network.

=== Mesopotamian reception ===
Humban is attested in four theophoric names from Nippur from the Kassite period, more than any deity of neither Mesopotamian nor Kassite origin with the exception of the Hurrian god Teshub, who is present in fifteen names, and Simut, present in nine names.

In the Neo-Assyrian period, Humban was regarded as an equivalent of Enlil, as indicated by two commentaries on the incantation series Šurpu. This equation was most likely based on their shared role as sources of royal power in the respective cultures, as no evidence in favor or against attributing any other functions of Enlil (such as determination of fates or control over weather) to Humban is available. Based on the equation of Humban with Enlil and Anu with Jabru in such sources, Heidemarie Koch proposed that Jabru was regarded as the father of Humban. However, Jabru is not attested in any Elamite sources, but only in Mesopotamian ones, and sometimes was himself described as the Elamite counterpart of Enlil. For example, according to the god list An = Anum, a god bearing the name Yabnu (^{d}ia-ab-na) was the "Enlil of Elam". According to Wilfred G. Lambert, Yanbu should be understood as the same god as Jabru.

Humban also appears alongside Jabru and Napirisha in the text Underworld Vision of an Assyrian Prince. Alexandre Lokotionov notes that this sequence of gods mirrors the reference to Humban in Šurpu, and that its inclusion possibly indicates that to the Assyrians the underworld "could have simply been a repository for the exotic and the unusual."

Ammankasibar, a god whose statue according to the annals of Ashurbanipal was taken to Assyria, has been identified with Humban by some researchers, but there is no plausible explanation for the element kasibar in his name.

== Disputed and disproved proposals ==
=== Humban as another name of Napirisha ===
According to another no longer accepted theory, originally proposed by Walther Hinz, Humban was the same god as Napirisha, with the latter being a "taboo name" of the former. Similarly, Kiririsha was held to be a taboo name of Pinikir rather than a distinct deity. This view has been commonly criticized from the 1980s onward, with some doubts about the former case expressed as early as 1901, and it is no longer supported by experts today. Due to its prevalence in the past, some older publications overestimate the number of inscriptions referring to Humban by treating the logogram ^{AN}GAL or DINGIR.GAL, corresponding to Napirisha (Elamite: "great god;" the cuneiform signs of the logogram have the same meaning in Sumerian) as representing him instead.

=== Humban and Humbaba ===
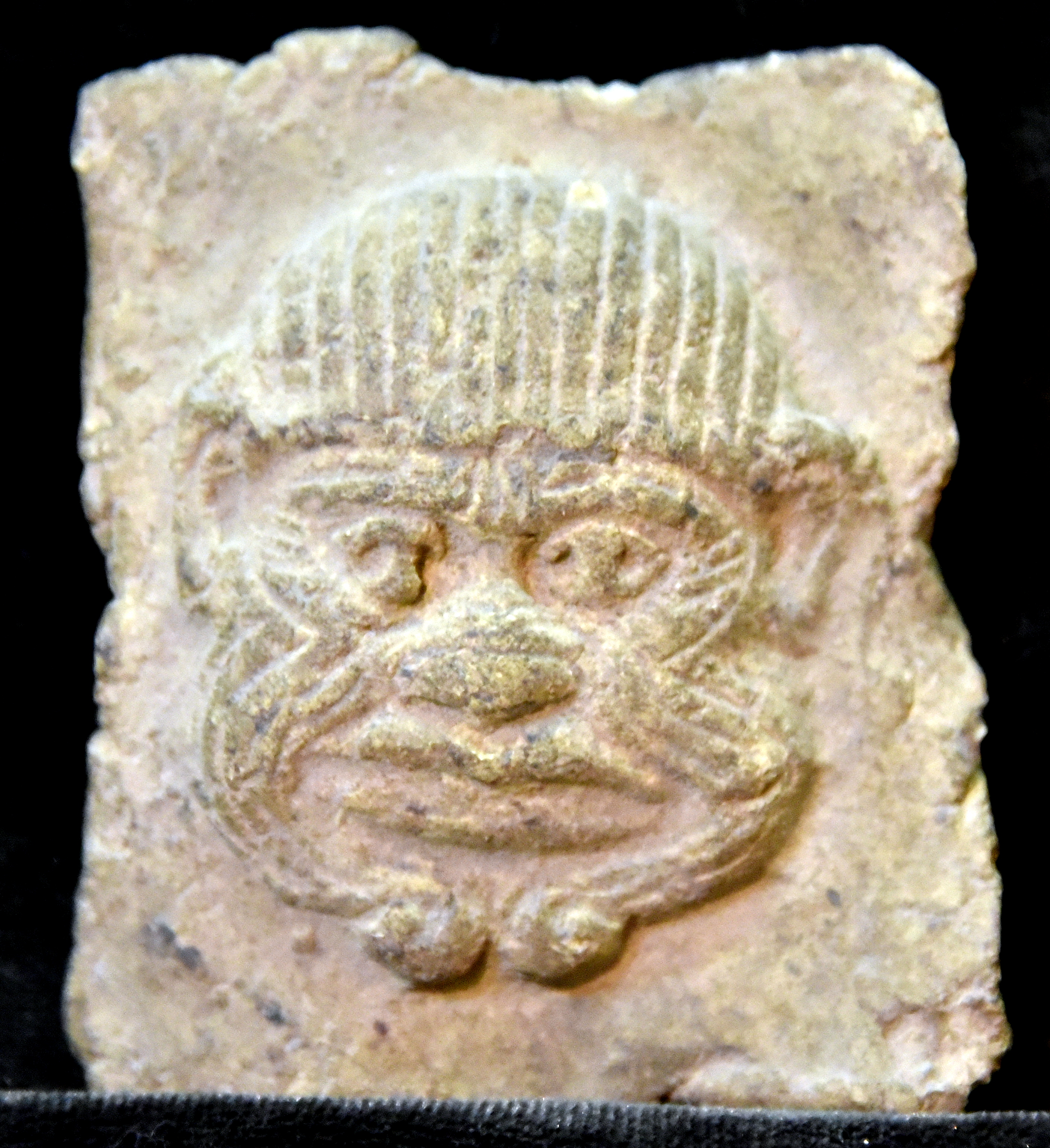
A clay plaque depicting Humbaba, in the past erroneously assumed to be related to Humban. Sulaymaniyah Museum, Iraq.

While in past scholarship it has been assumed that Humban might have been the model for Humbaba, the guardian of the Cedar Forest in the Epic of Gilgamesh, this theory is no longer considered plausible today according to Andrew R. George, who notes that it relied on "unsafe historical conclusions". Humbaba's name has no clear linguistic affiliation, and its writing varies between various locations and time periods, with the original form being Huwawa. Based on attestations from the Ur III period it is assumed it was initially an ordinary personal name used in Mesopotamia.

=== Humban and Haman ===
An early, now discredited, hypothesis proposed by Georg Hüsing in 1916 aimed to connect Humban with biblical Haman, Greek mythical figure Memnon (based on Humban-Numena according to Hüsing), Egyptian god Ammon, and Japanese Hachiman. More recently, a connection between Humban and Haman has been suggested by Stephanie Dalley, who also argues that the other figures from the Book of Esther were similarly derived from deities - Esther from Ishtar and Mordecai from Marduk. However, Karen Radner in a review of Dalley's work states that she is reluctant to accept her hypotheses about the development of the Book of Esther. She also notes that Dalley's interpretation of the historical data is not entirely rigorous and that in some cases sources she relies on should be regarded as "dated". Maria Brosius also evaluates Dalley's hypothesis that characters in the Book of Esther are derived from specific deities critically, and points out it does not represent academic consensus. She additionally criticizes her for avoiding the mention of any alternate views about the development of the discussed text.

Wouter Henkelman more cautiously notes that it has been proposed that Haman's name might be a theophoric name invoking Humban. However, Frans van Koppen and Karel van der Toorn entirely rule out the possibility of a connection between the names on phonological grounds. They argue a Persian etymology is more plausible, and suggest a relation to personal names such as Hamanā and Hamayun.
