= Kiririsha =

Elamite goddess

- Elamite “mother of gods”
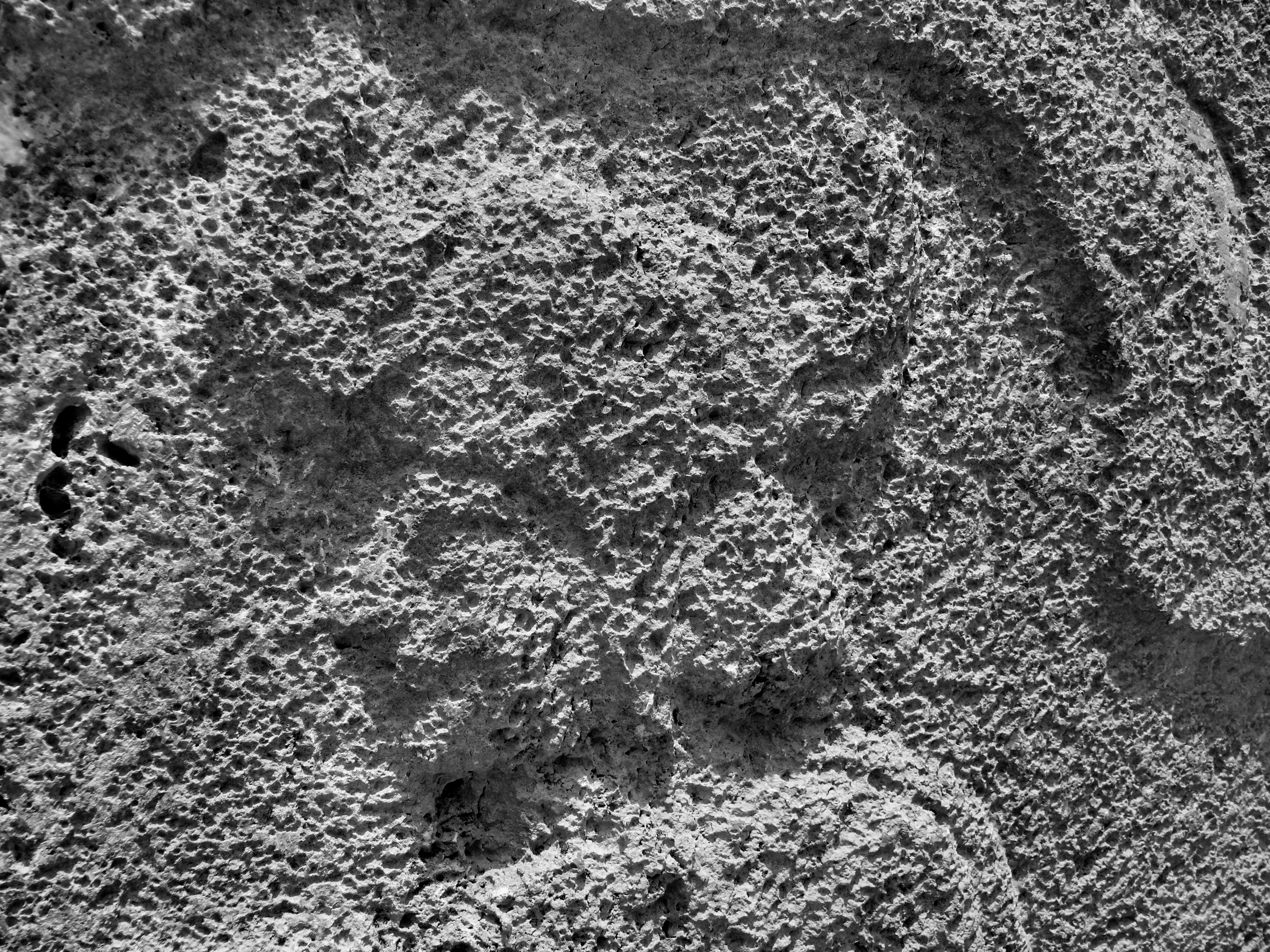
- A female deity depicted on Kurangun relief, often identified as Kiririsha
- Major cult center: Liyan, Chogha Zanbil

Genealogy
- Consort: Napirisha
- Children: Hutran

Kiririsha (Elamite: "great goddess") was a major goddess worshiped in Elam, referred to as "mother of gods" in some texts.

Early scholarship incorrectly identified her as one and the same as Pinikir, an unrelated goddess from a different part of Elam.

== Name ==
The name Kiririsha means "great goddess" in Elamite ("kiri" goddess, "risha" great). Following their survey of Linear Elamite texts, Desset et al. argued that Elamite "riša" would actually be pronounced as "reša", with Akkadian cuneiform being incapable of distinguishing between ri and re. Similarly, Napirisha’s proposed pronunciation is Napiresha.

== Character ==
Kiririsha is regarded as one of the most prominent Elamite deities by modern researchers. Elamite texts refer to her as "mother of gods."

An inscription of Hanni of Ayapir from the neo-Elamite period describes her, Napirisha and Tepti as gods "who have always protected water and earth" or "who have let thrive water and earth." As Napirisha is generally assumed to be associated with water due to identification with Ea, Wouter Henkelman proposes that Kirirsha could possibly be connected to earth, and that she is the deity whose name is only represented by the logogram KI ("earth" in Sumerian) in the Persepolis fortification archive.

Kiririsha additionally also has a possible association with death. One argument usually put in favor of her underworld associations is the epithet: "zana Liyan lahakra," which is so far only attested once, in an inscription by Silhak-Inshushinak. Vallat had translated the phrase as "lady of the death in Liyan." which was followed by other scholars such as Henkelman and Grillot-Susini. However, this translation of lahakra is not unanimous, for example Malbran-Labat translates it as "hidden" instead. Tavernier had also recently argued against the translation of lahakra as "death" or "the dead" and supports the translation as hidden or secret. However, this would also mean that the epithet could no longer be used as an example of a funerary character. Another argument in favor for an underworld association for Kiririsha is the mention of grove temples dedicated to her, as multiple grove temples were dedicated to deities generally assumed to have a chthonic aspect, and the lines from Ashurbanipal's inscription referring to entering the groves and destroying the royal tombs are generally taken as one statement. Vallat and Grillot-Susini also assumed that there were doors to the groves and that the doors also had funerary aspects, considering that doors were dedicated to deities like Inshushinak, Kiririsha, Ishmekarab and Lagamal, who they viewed as underworld gods. However, grove temples were also attested for gods without a relationship to the underworld, and Tavernier had pointed out that not all the gods Vallat and Grillot-Susini believed were underworld gods actually were, especially Ishmekarab. Nonetheless, Kiririsha is still viewed to be an underworld goddess.

Multiple other Elamite deities also held the epithet lahakara, including Inshushinak and the goddess Upurkubak. It has been proposed that certain religious structures, namely monumental gates and so-called siyan husame ("temple in a grove") were related to a deity's underworld-related character in Elam, but this theory is disputed. Excavations in the proximity of Bushehr in Iran, near the site of ancient Liyan, revealed the existence of a custom involving "burials" of palm trees, which has been tentatively linked to the cult of Kiririsha by researchers.

== Association with other deities ==
Napirisha and Kirisha are regarded as consorts in Elamite texts. It has been proposed that they might be the divine couple represented on reliefs from Kurangun and Naqsh-e Rostam.

Kiririsha and Napirisha were commonly grouped with Inshushinak in inscriptions, leading some researchers to propose that they were understood as a trinity in the Elamite pantheon. Milan Jahamgirfar notes that Elamite groupings of deities varied between specific areas, but nonetheless tentatively accepts the view that Inshushinak, Napirisha and Kirisha constituted a triad in the national pantheon.

The god Hutran, who originated in Awan, was regarded as a son of Kiririsha and Napirisha.

== Worship ==
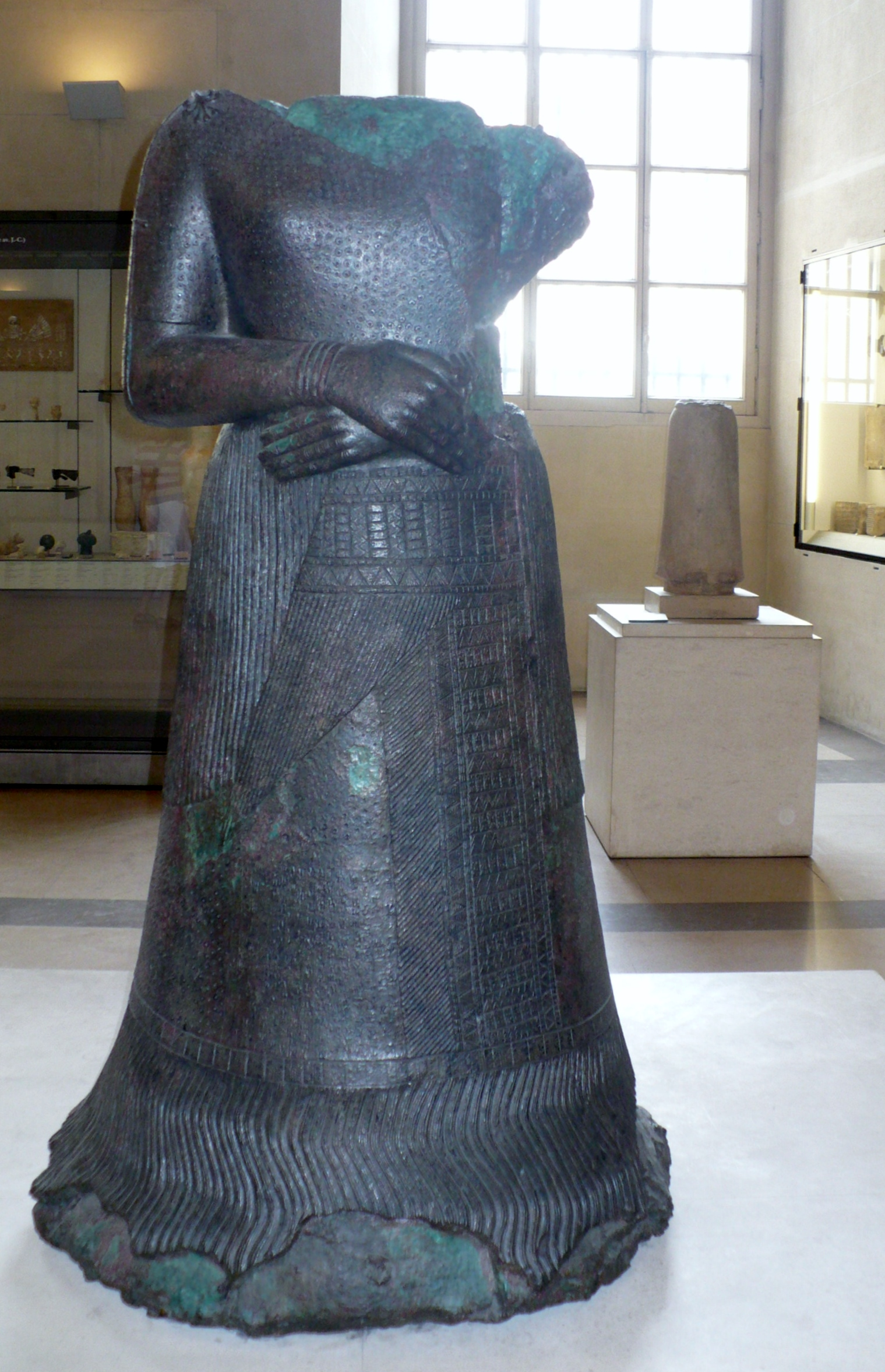
Statue of Napir-Asu, inscribed with a curse formula invoking Kiririsha.

Kiririsha was most likely the tutelary goddess of Liyan, where she is attested as early as in the 19th century BCE. She was also an important member of the pantheon of Anshan. Her worship spread to various locations in the Elamite highlands in the late Middle Elamite period.

King Humban-Numena built a temple dedicated to her in Liyan. It was later restored by Shutruk-Nakhunte as well as Kutir-Nahhunte.

Inscriptions from the reign of Untash-Napirisha indicate new statues and temples of Kiririsha were created during that period. One of her temples was a part of the Chogha Zanbil complex. Numerous artifacts inscribed with the name of Untash-Napirisha have been recovered from it, including various weapons (ax and mace heads, swords and daggers), small animal figures and jewelry. She is also mentioned, alongside Napirisha and Inshushinak, in a curse inscribed on the statue of Napir-Asu, assumed to be the king's principal wife and daughter of Kassite king Burna-Buriash II.

Yet another temple dedicated to Kiririsha, shared with Napirisha, Inshushinak and Simut, existed in Anshan. It was built during the reign of Hutelutush-Inshushinak.

The stele of Shilhak-Inshushinak invokes Napirisha, Kiririsha, Inshushinak and Humban, followed by 7 more deities.

Kiririsha continued to be revered in the neo-Elamite period in Susa and in Ayapir (modern Izeh). Hanni of Ayapir mentioned Kiririsha in a curse formula alongside Napirisha and Tepti.

== Disproved theories ==
Walther Hinz, an early researcher of Elam, believed that Kiririsha was not a distinct goddess, but merely a "taboo name" of Pinikir. The theory of Elamite divine "taboo names" in general and specifically of the alleged equivalence between Kiririsha and Pinikir (and between Humban and Napirisha) is considered discredited by modern researchers of Elamite religion such as Wouter Henkelman and François Vallat. Kiririsha and Pinikir have their origin in pantheons of different parts of Elam (Liyan and Awan, respectively), were worshiped separately at Chogha Zanbil, and both appear in an inscription accompanying a bronze relief from Susa. Additionally, while Pinikir is compared both in ancient texts and in modern scholarship to Ishtar and Ninsianna, Kiririsha is instead regarded as similar to Ninhursag.

The view that Kiririsha and Pinikir were one deity, pioneered by Hinz, lead to the formation of a theory that the latter was a mother goddess like her. However, the title "mother of gods" associated with Kiririsha is only attested for the goddess Mashti from Malamir otherwise.

Another of Hinz's proposals regarded as doubtful today is the theory that Kiririsha was the consort of both Napirisha and Inshushinak at once.

== Bibliography ==
- Beckman, Gary (1999). "The Goddess Pirinkir and Her Ritual from Ḫattuša (CTH 644)". Ktèma: Civilisations de l'Orient, de la Grèce et de Rome antiques. 24 (1). PERSEE Program: 25–39. doi:10.3406/ktema.1999.2206. hdl:2027.42/77419. ISSN 0221-5896.
- Desset, François; Tabibzadeh, Kambiz; Kervran, Matthieu; Basello, Gian Pietro; Marchesi, and Gianni (1 July 2022). "The Decipherment of Linear Elamite Writing". Zeitschrift für Assyriologie und vorderasiatische Archäologie. 112 (1): 11–60. doi:10.1515/za-2022-0003. hdl:11585/890284. ISSN 1613-1150.
- Garrison, Mark A. (2007), "Ninkhursaga" (PDF), Iconography of Deities and Demons in the Ancient Near East
- Grillot-Susini, Françoise (2001). "Le Monde D'en Bas En Susiane". Revue d'Assyriologie et d'archéologie orientale. 95 (2): 141–148. ISSN 0373-6032. JSTOR 23281193.
- Henkelman, Wouter F. M. (2008). The other gods who are: studies in Elamite-Iranian acculturation based on the Persepolis fortification texts. Leiden: Nederlands Instituut voor het Nabije Oosten. ISBN 978-90-6258-414-7.
- Jahangirfar, Milad (2018). "The Elamite Triads: Reflections on the Possible Continuities in Iranian Tradition". Iranica Antiqua. 53: 105–124.
- Potts, Daniel T. (1999). The Archaeology of Elam. Cambridge University Press. doi:10.1017/cbo9780511489617. ISBN 978-0-521-56358-1.
- Malbran-Labat, Florence (1 January 1995). Les inscriptions royales de Suse: Briques de l'époque paléo-élamite à l'empire néo-élamite (in French). FeniXX. ISBN 978-2-7118-7658-7.
- Taracha, Piotr (2005), "Pirengir", Reallexikon der Assyriologie
- Tavernier, Jan (1 January 2013). "Elamite and Old Iranian Afterlife Concepts". In De Graef, Katrien; Tavernier, Jan (eds.). Susa and Elam. Archaeological, Philological, Historical and Geographical Perspectives. pp. 471–489. doi:10.1163/9789004207417_028.
- Vallat, François (2012), "ELAM vi. Elamite religion", Encyclopædia Iranica
- Vallat, François (1997). "Le caractère funéraire de la ziggurat en Elam" (PDF). Nouvelles Assyriologiques Brèves et Utilitaires: 36–37.
- Wicks, Yasmina (17 January 2019). ""Alas, Short is the Joy of Life": Death and the Afterlife through an Elamite Lens". Profiling Death. Neo-Elamite Mortuary Practices, Afterlife Beliefs, and Entanglements with Ancestors. Brill. pp. 169–189. ISBN 978-90-04-39177-2.
