= Napirisha =

Elamite god

- Dynastic god of Elamite kings, representative deity of Anshan
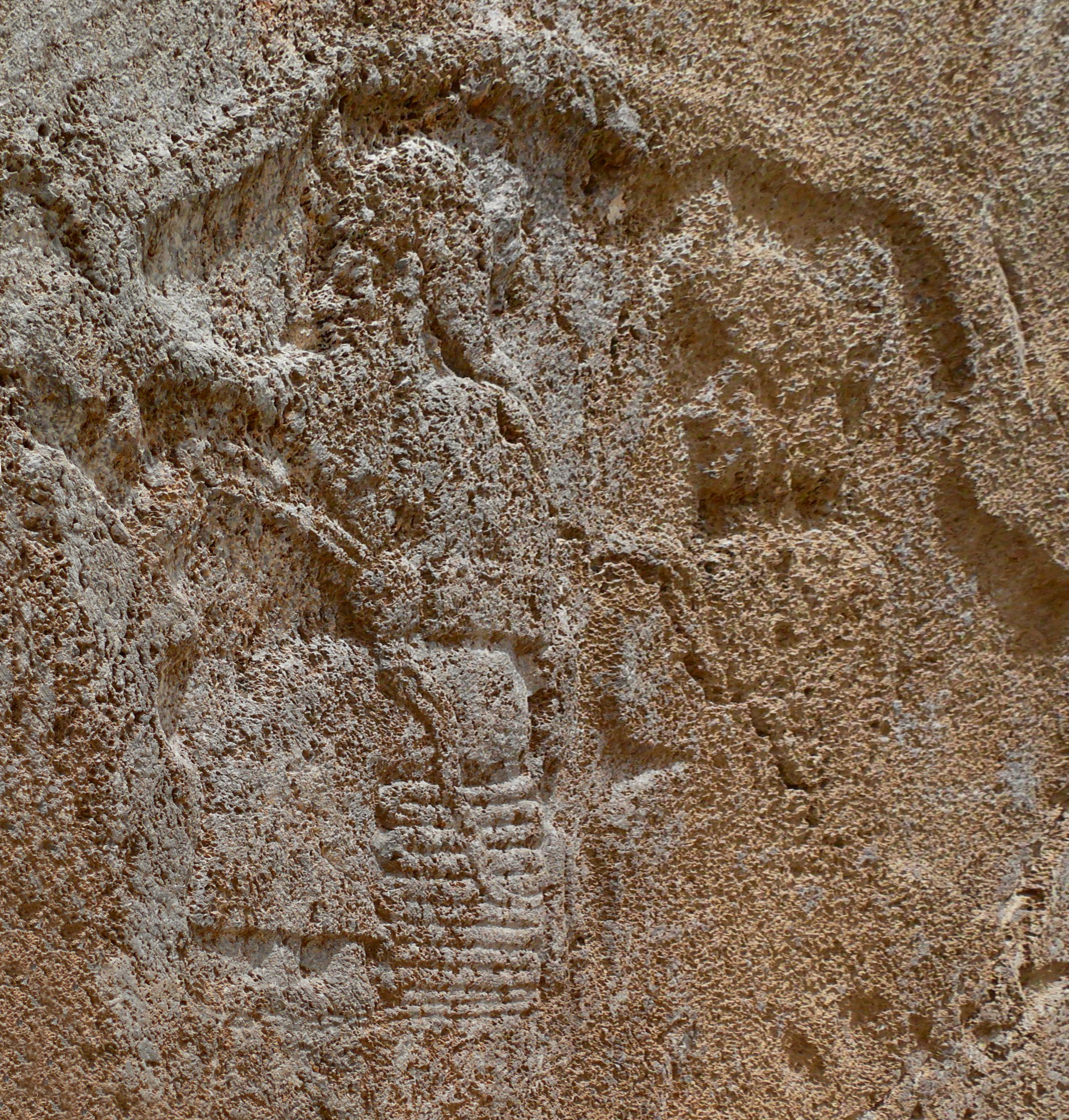
- The Serpent God depicted on Kurangun relief
- Major cult center: Chogha Zanbil

Genealogy
- Consort: Kiririsha
- Children: Hutran

Equivalents
- Mesopotamian: Ea

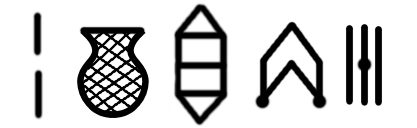
Napirisha (Linear Elamite: Napirriša) was a major Elamite deity. He likely originated from Anshan.

== Name ==
The name Napirisha is written logographically as ^{d}GAL. Hinz had in 1965 suggested that the name should be read as Napirisha ("napir" god, and "risha" great) in Elamite, and since then other sources have confirmed the reading. The name is spelled syllabically as Na-ap-ri-ša or Na-pi-ri-ša in the Old Elamite period, and the Šurpu collection of incantations spells the name as Nap-ru-šu. In the Persepolis Fortification Texts from the Achaemenid period, Napirisha was spelled as Na‐pír‐šá‐ra or Na‐pír‐ir‐šá‐ir‐ra, following the linguistic development of risha into irsha, which suggests that the name Napirisha was still understood as a compound name. Desset et al., after their decipherment of Linear Elamite argued that the name should be instead read as Napiresha, which was written as Napirisha due to Akkadian cuneiform lacking a distinction between the sounds "ri" and "re". They previously suggested that in Linear Elamite the r is repeated twice in some texts to reflect a contracted pronunciation, that the preceding i vowel before the stress was lost in pronunciation in a similar fashion to the toponym Hupšan and the theonym Inshushinak. The suggestion of a truncated pronunciation was abandoned in their more recent publication, pointing out that no Elamite spelling leaves out the i vowel. Instead, it is suggested to be a marker for syllable stress. The name is spelled as Na-pi_{2}(-r)-ri-ša in Linear Elamite.

== Characteristics ==
Napirisha is believed to have originated from Anshan, entering Susa as a dynastic god following the dynasty of Shimashki, especially since Kiririsha, who is generally viewed to be the consort of Napirisha, is the tutelary goddess of Liyan. It is generally believed that Napirisha (and Kiririsha) were Anshanite gods. and that Napirisha represents Anshan as its main god, similar to Inshushinak with Susa.

The earliest attestation of Napirisha is in a tablet likely dating to the early Sukkalmah dynasty, where an oath was taken in the name of the god. However, if the dating of some of the newly translated Linear Elamite inscriptions are accurate, then the earliest attestation of Napirisha is during the Shimashki dynasty, during the reign of Kindattu. Desset more recently suggested that Napirisha might be tied directly to the Shimashki dynasty. However, Grillot-Susini claims that Napirisha and Kiririsha were present side-by-side on a scribal tablet dating to before the Sukkalmah dynasty in Susa.

In the Šurpu incantation series, Napirisha is identified with Ea. (Note: In An = Anum, the listed Elamite equivalent of Ea is ^{d}ib-na-ḫa-za. As Krebernik had pointed out however, the names in the “divine seven of Elam” section appears to be a variation of the names from the previous section detailing the seven brothers of Narundi.) It is thus assumed that Napirisha may have had similar traits and characteristics as Ea, such as being associated with subterranean waters. Alongside this, Napirisha is also sometimes assumed to also be an underworld god, in a similar vein to Inshushinak, Lagamal and Kiririsha. Glassner suggests that an inscription on a gunagi vessel that invoked Napirisha describing burnt offerings for Amma-tedak for guaranteeing a line of succession for Ebarat represents offerings to the deceased ruler to lead the now deceased Amma-tedak on the way to Napirisha in a similar vein to a later inscription by Shilhak-Inshushinak, which is commonly interpreted as asking the deceased ruler Kuk-Kirwash to be an intercessor on the way to Inshushinak. In the god list Anshar=Anum, Napirisha is listed as a name or equivalent of Anu and possibly also as one of the other names for Shamash.

The identification of the god on the Kurungum relief, and by extension the motif of a god on a serpent throne with streaming waters, is currently still a subject of debate. Some scholars identify the god on the relief as Napirisha, while others with Inshushinak. French archaeologist Pierre de Miroschedji identified the figure as Inshushinak, but recognized that the identification with Napirisha would be more convenient. Potts had suggested that it was both Napirisha and Inshushinak, especially on the basis that both gods were identified with Ea. Álvarez-Mon suggests that the two gods were syncretized and shared responsibilities, and thus the relief may have depicted them as one, or perhaps key attributes were merged into a single “great god” (^{d}GAL). De Graef also suggests that both deities are depicted as one in a seal dating to the sukkalmah period that depicts a god on a serpent throne with water flowing from the hand following her retranslation of the sea.

== Relationship with other deities ==
Napirisha appears commonly together with Inshushinak starting from the Sukkalmah period, and from the middle Elamite period Napirisha forms a kind of divine triad with Kiririsha and Inshushinak, and is likely the main national triad. Within the three, Napirisha is always mentioned first, likely reflecting the primacy of Anshan over Susa in royal Elamite ideology and tradition.

Napirisha and Kiririsha are presented to be a couple, and are generally viewed as the divine couple of Anshan. An inscription from Silhak-Inshushinak lists Hutran as their son, although this is likely a later ideology. One of the suggestions of the identity of the deities depicted on the Kurangum relief was that of Napirisha and Kiririsha, as the relief depicts one god and one goddess.

Napirisha and Inshushinak also share traits and possibly iconography, and the two gods may had been syncretized together. Other scholars further suggest that they may even have been viewed as the same god at one point, especially on a national level for cohesion. König notes that in texts from Chogha Zanbil Napirisha and Inshushinak were treated as singular grammatically, but assumes a bad grammatical understanding of an original Akkadian term, while Grillot-Susini and Jahangirfar takes it as evidence that the two gods were syncretized. Grillot-Susini believes that Inshushinak assimilated some of Napirisha's traits due to political and religious reasons, but points out that they remained as separate deities, and De Graef also stresses that even if they appear together so much that their iconography and characteristics have meshed together, it does not mean they are the same god. Vallat rejects Grillot-Susini’s proposal that Inshushinak assimilated some traits as it is possible he was also viewed as similar to Ea like Napirisha, and that Napirisha generally had a higher position as he is always mentioned first, but also rejects the proposal that the two gods were assimilated.

An old theory pioneered by Hinz was that Napirisha was a taboo name for Humban, and that it was an epithet for Humban. However, de Miroschedji had shown that Napirisha and Humban were separate and distinct deities, and the dual-name Humban-napirisha is not attested in Elamite sources so Napirisha also can't be an epithet. The view that Napirisha and Humban are separate gods is currently the more accepted one.

In the Underworld Vision of an Assyrian Prince, Napirisha, along with Humban and Jabru, appear together and are named as protectors of the ghost. They also appear together in the Šurpu incantation series, in the same order. The Underworld Vision of an Assyrian Prince otherwise also has other cultural influences, notably Egyptian, which is perhaps linked to the multicultural environment of the Assyrian Empire.

== Worship ==
A temple to Napirisha, Kiririsha and the Bahahutep is attested at Tol-e Peytul (Liyan) in the Middle Elamite period. Shrines dedicated to Napirisha were also discovered in Susa during the Middle Elamite Period.

De Miroschedji suggested that Napirisha was the personal god of Untash-Napirisha.

The name of a temple constructed by Hutelutush-Inshushinak at Anshan and dedicated to Napirisha, Kiririsha, Inshushinak and Simut was translated as the "temple of alliance" by M. Lambert, which de Miroschedji interpreted as representing the union of the regions of Elam, that being Susa, Anshan and Simut as Elam. Additionally, the high temple at Chogha Zanbil was dedicated jointly to Napirisha and Inshushinak, even though several inscriptions appear to refer to both of the gods as singular.

Napirisha was still attested during the Achaemenid period, and is recorded in the fortification texts. He appears a total of 26 times, and Henkelman suggests that his popularity within the Fortification Archives may be due to his origin from the highlands. He is attested with regions not historically known to have been under Elamite cultural influence, which led to Haidemarie Koch to assume that Napirisha was only venerated in isolated communities by the Elamites. However, such a suggestion relies on a cultural dichotomy or exclusion between the Persians and the Elamites, which had been challenged in more recent scholarship.
