= Liyan =

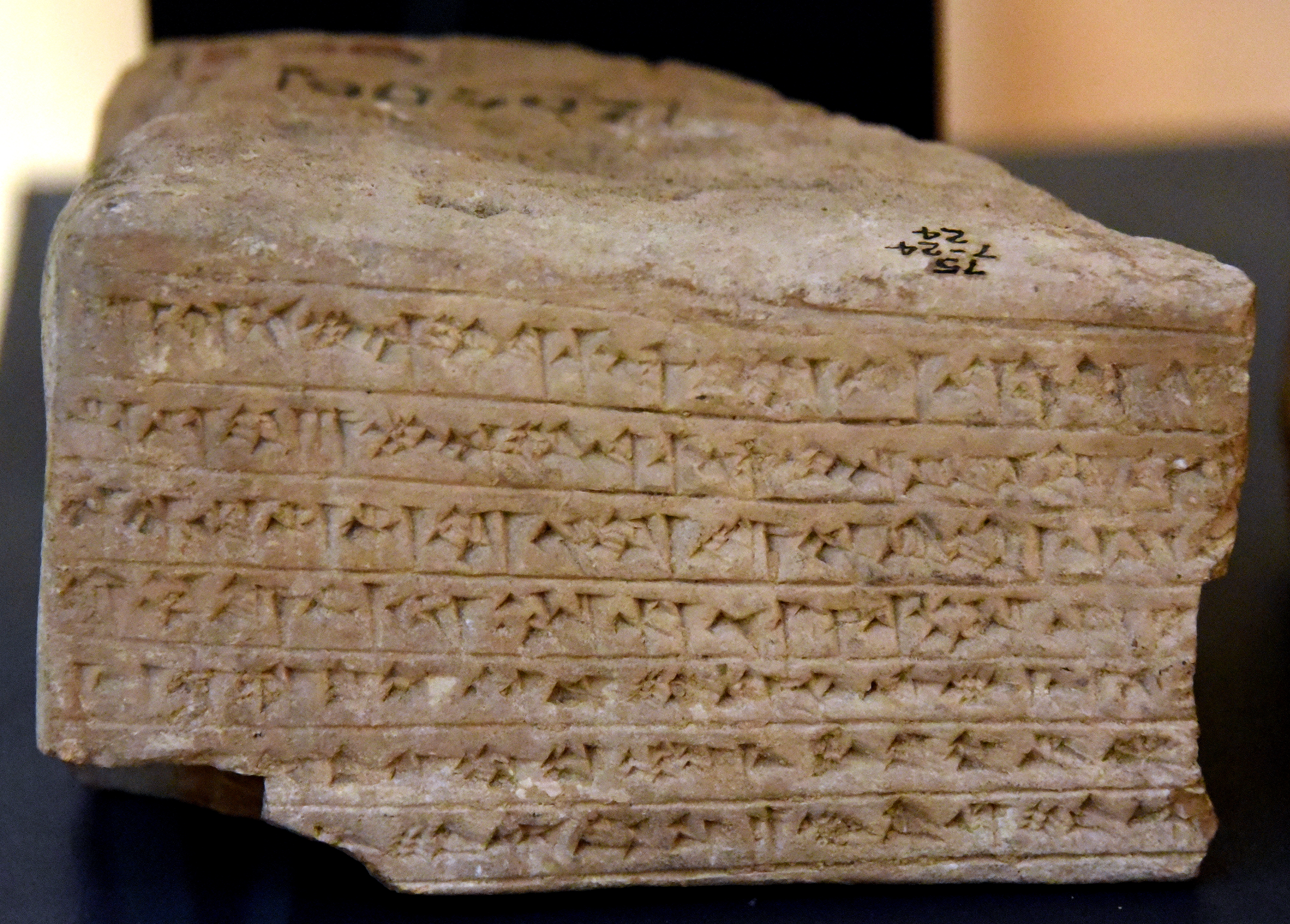
Fired clay brick. The cuneiform inscription mentions the name of the Elamite king Shilhak-Inshushinak I. Middle Elamite Period, 1150-1120 BCE. From Liyan, Iran. British Museum

Liyan is an Elamite port on Persian Gulf (near modern-day Bushire, Iran), and first name of Kiririsha (at one stage became the most important goddess of Elam, ranked second only to her husband the god,) where she and Humban had a temple that was erected by Humban-Numena. There was later (ca. 1250 BC) a temple built to her at Chogha Zanbil. She was often called 'the Great', or 'the divine mother'. She seems to have been primarily worshipped in the south of Elam.
