= Ruhurater =

Ruhurater or Lahuratil was an Elamite deity.

== Name ==
One proposal of the meaning of the name is "(the god who is the) creator (of) man". Desset et al. appears to suggest reading "ruhu" as "offspring". They also recently suggested to read the second part of the name as “-razer” instead of “-rater”, as the name follows a discrepancy in transliterating z from Linear Elamite to Cuneiform with an attested variant spelling la-hu-ra-še-er. The Elamite z was suggested to be a Voiceless dental fricative or a sibilant affricate.

== Character ==
Ruhurater is the city god of Huhnur.

Ruhurater's gender is uncertain, though some researchers refer to him as a male deity. It has been proposed that his name means "(the god who is the) creator (of) man" and that he was connected to various creator deities (collectively known as Napratep), but his role in Elamite beliefs remains uncertain. It is possible that he was regarded as a creator deity in a specific area of Elam, but not in the entire region.

Many documents mentioning Ruhurater are legal texts which cast him in the role of a divine witness, alongside the Mesopotamian Shamash. In two of the legal documents from Susa where Ruhurater appears, the measurement for silver was the city weight of the city of Huhnir, likely indicating that the transactions were either done in Huhnur, or Huhnur was the city the trader came from. The kidinnu (here possibly to be understood as a symbol for a god) of Ruhurater is mentioned in one of these texts from Susa in relation to a loan of Silver. In legal texts excavated from Teppeh Bormi (Huhnur) Ruhurater is invoked along with Nahhunte as divine witnesses, as in Susa where Inshushinak and Nahhunte were invoked for the role.

He is also described as capable of bestowing kiten, an Elamite religious concept which can be translated as "divine protection." Wouter Henkelman notes that his role in them can be compared to that played by Inshushinak in similar texts from Susa.

== Worship ==
The oldest attestion of Ruhutater comes from Tepe Bormi, possibly to be identified with the ancient Elamite city of Huhnur. The text in mention, an inscription of Amar-Sin, a Mesopotamian king from the Third Dynasty of Ur, states that Huhnur was the cult center of this god. Amar-Sin apparently rebuilt Ruhurater's temple located there and returned a statue of the god to it. Association between him and Huhnur is also attested in two texts from the Sukkalmah period. Another temple of Ruhurater, shared with Hishmitik, was located at Chogha Zanbil. It has been proposed that Hishmitik was his spouse, but this remains unproven.

Two Elamite kings bore the theophoric name Tan-Ruhurater, "obedient to Ruhurater." Tan-Ruhurater I was the eighth ruler from the Shimashki dynasty, while Tan-Ruhurater II belonged to the Kidinuid dynasty.

Ruhurater is mentioned on a stele of the neo-Elamite king Atta-hamiti-Insushinak, who reigned in the sixth century BCE. While Ruhurater is not directly mentioned in the Persepolis Administrative Archives, it is possible that offerings to unspecified gods made in Huhnur mentioned in it constituted an Achaemenid continuation of his cult.

== In Mesopotamia ==
In Mesopotamian scholarly texts, Ruhurater was considered to be an equivalent of Ninurta. In a Neo-Assyrian fragment of shorter An = Anum, Ruhurater is likely listed as one of the Elamite equivalents of Ninurta. The "Hurabtil" mentioned in the Anzû epic as one of the names of Ninurta in Elam is likely a variant spelling of Ruhurater (Lahuratil).

An Elamite bearing a theophoric name invoking Ruhurater, Kutir-Ruhurater, is also mentioned in records from archives of the Mesopotamian First Sealand dynasty.
