= Napir =

Elamite god of the moon

Napir (Linear Elamite: Elamite cuneiform: 𒈾𒀊𒅕 Na-pi-ir) was the Elamite god of the moon. The name was likely derived from the Elamite word nap or napir meaning "god". Not much is known on Elamite gods, however Napir is often depicted as having bull horns.
