= Chogha Zanbil =

Ancient Elamite complex in Khuzestan Province, Iran

- چغازنبيل (Persian); Dur Untash (Elamite)
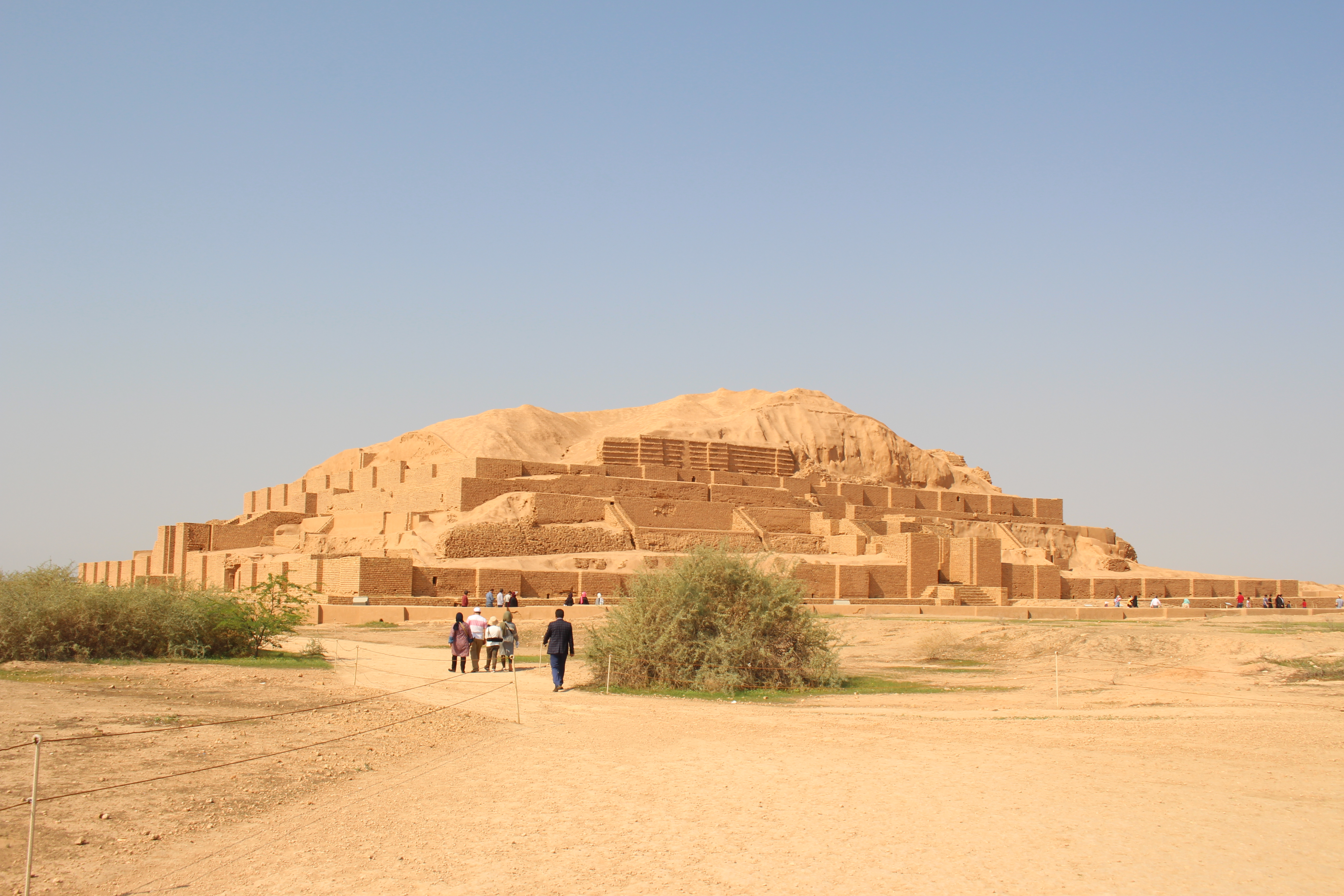

- Location within Iran Location within West and Central Asia
- Interactive map of Chogha Zanbil
- 32°0′30″N 48°31′15″E
- Type: Settlement
- Cultures: Elamite
- Location: Khuzestan Province, Iran

History
- Built: c. 1250 BC
- Built by: Untash-Napirisha
- Abandoned: c. 645 BC

Site notes
- Excavation dates: 1935–39, 1946, 1951–1961, 1999, 2002, 2004–2005
- Archaeologists: Roland de Mecquenem, Roman Ghirshman, Behzad Mofidi Nasrabadi
- Condition: In ruins

UNESCO World Heritage Site
- Official name: Tchogha Zanbil
- Criteria: Cultural: (iii), (iv)
- Reference: 113
- Inscription: 1979 (3rd Session)

The original name of Chogha Zanbil, according to the brick inscriptions discovered at the site, was Dura-wontash in Akkadian.

Chogha Zanbil (Note: also Tchoga Zanbil and Čoġā Zanbīl; Persian: چغازنبيل, Elamite: Al Untas Napirisa, later Dur Untash) is an ancient Elamite complex in the Khuzestan province of Iran. It is one of the few existing ziggurats outside Mesopotamia. It lies approximately 30 km (19 mi) southeast of Susa and 80 km (50 mi) north of Ahvaz. The construction date of the city is unclear due to uncertainty in the chronology of the reign of Untash-Napirisha, but is clearly sometime in the 14th or 13th century BC. The conventionally assumed date is 1250 BC. The city is currently believed to have been destroyed by the Neo-Assyrian ruler Assurbanipal in about 645 BC, along with the Elamite capital of Susa, though some researchers place the end of occupation in the late 12th century BC. The ziggurat is considered to be the best preserved example of the stepped pyramidal monument by UNESCO. In 1979, Chogha Zanbil became the first Iranian site to be inscribed on the UNESCO World Heritage List.

== History ==
Chogha Zanbil is typically translated as 'basket mound.' It was built about 1250 BC by the king Untash-Napirisha, mainly to honor the great god Inshushinak. Its original name was Dur Untash, which means 'town of Untash', but it is unlikely that many people, besides priests and servants, ever lived there. The complex is protected by three concentric walls which define the main areas of the town. It is known from inscriptions that the outer wall had seven gates, of which only two have been found. The middle wall had four gates and between the outer and middle walls was a shared temple dedicated to the chief Elamite god Napirisha and to Inshushinak. Most of the innermost 2.5 ha (6.2 acres) area is wholly taken up with a great ziggurat dedicated to the main god, which was built over an earlier square temple with storage rooms also built by Untash-Napirisha.

The middle area holds eleven temples for other gods. These included Nabu, Adad, Shala, Inanna, Ninegal, Humban, Shimut, Pinikir, Manzat, and Nuska. There are also sanctuaries northeast of the ziggurat for the Elamite deities Isniqarab (Ishmekarab) and Kiririsha. A brick inscription mentioned a golden statue dedicated to the god Nahhunte. Brick inscriptions referring to twenty-two temples have been found but only about half of those have been located. In the outer area are royal palaces, a funerary palace containing five subterranean royal tombs.

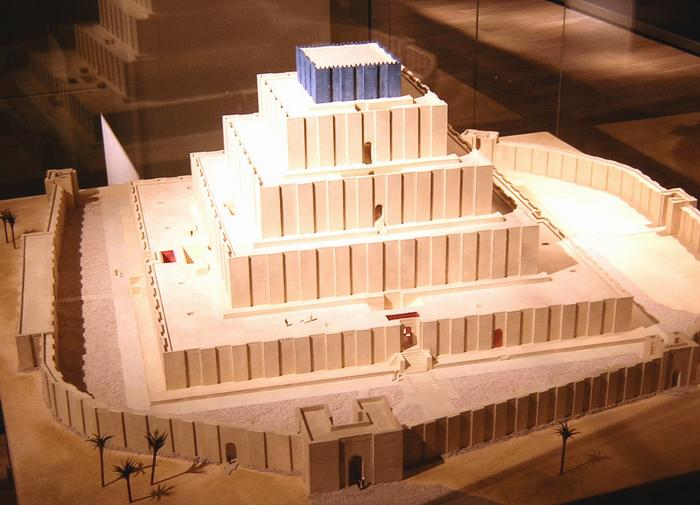
Chogha Zanbil Ziggurat (model)

Construction at the site, which included commercial and residential areas, continued after Untash-Napirisha's death with numerous building phases and continued to be occupied until it was destroyed by the Assyrian king Ashurbanipal in about 645 BC. Some scholars speculate, based on the large number of temples and sanctuaries at Chogha Zanbil, that Untash-Napirisha attempted to create a new religious center (possibly intended to replace Susa) which would unite the gods of both highland and lowland Elam at one site.

The ziggurat originally measured 105.2 metres (345 ft) on each side and about 53 metres (174 ft) in height, in five levels, and was crowned with a temple. Mud brick was the basic material of the whole ensemble. The ziggurat was given a facing of baked bricks, a number of which have cuneiform characters giving the names of deities in the Elamite and Akkadian languages. Though the ziggurat now stands only 24.75 metres (81.2 ft) high, less than half its estimated original height, its state of preservation is unsurpassed.

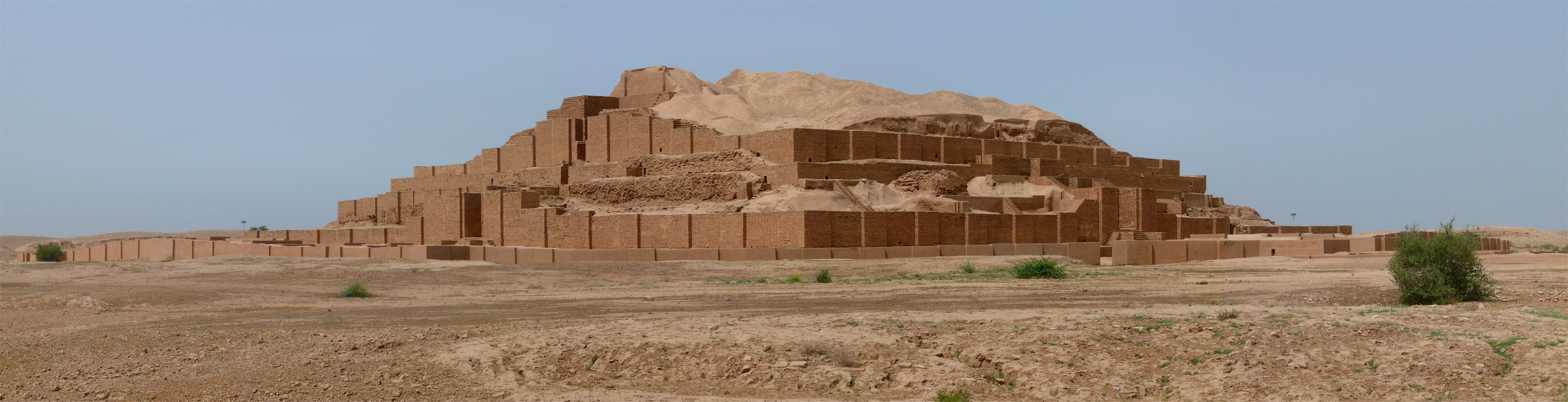

== Archaeology ==
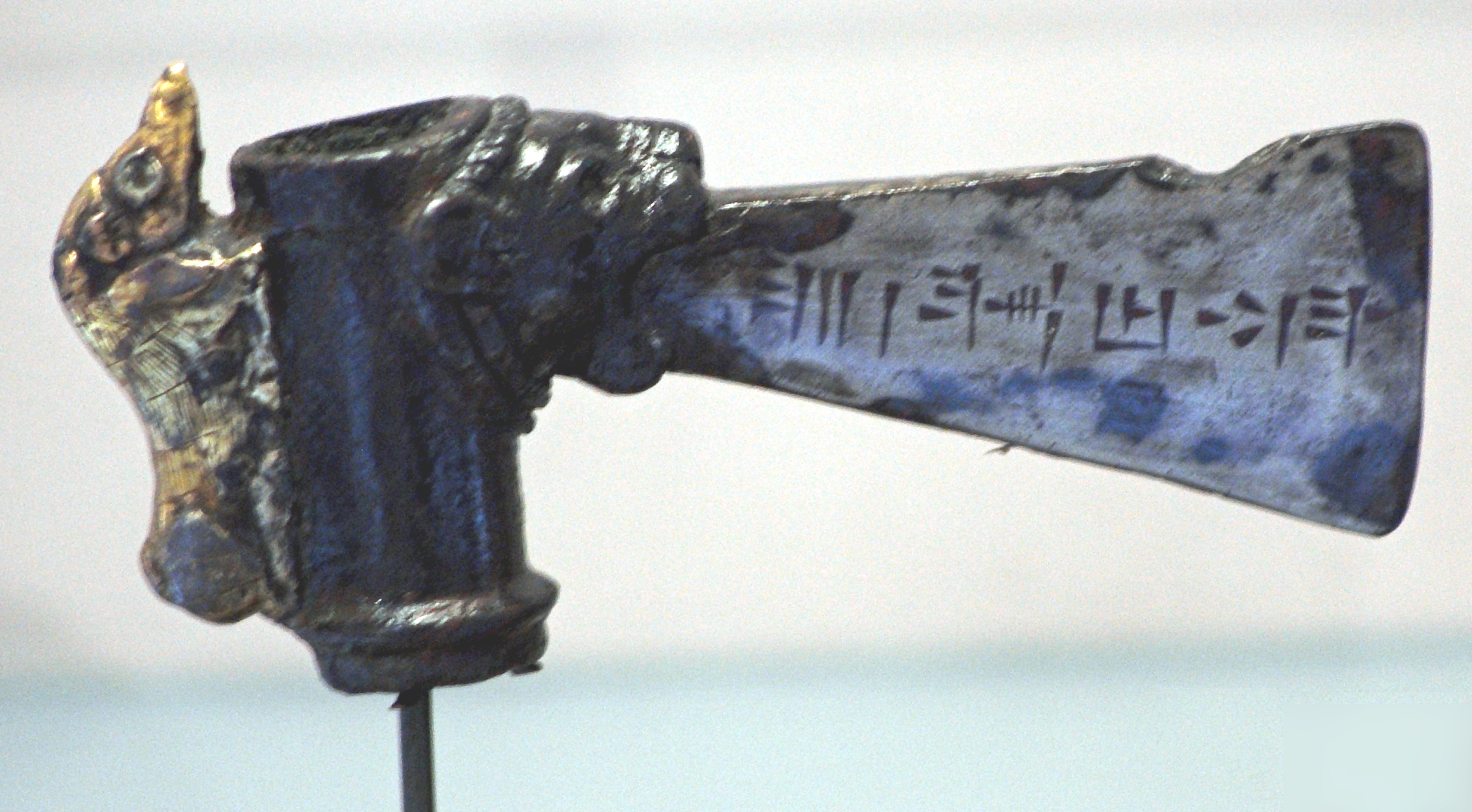
Axe bearing the name of the king Untash-Napirisha.

The site, measuring 96 ha (240 acres) in area, was originally discovered by a geologist doing oil exploration in the area. He found an inscribed brick and, being an amateur archaeologist, took it to excavators then working at the site of Susa. The inscription described the building of a sacred city by one "Untash-Gal". It was surveyed and excavated by Roland de Mecquenem in 1935–39 and 1946. Chogha Zanbil was excavated in six seasons (a total of 21 months) between 1951 and 1962 by Roman Ghirshman with the French Archeological Mission. Almost 100,000 yd^{3} (76,000 m^{3}) of debris were removed in the process, using a crew of 100 to 125 workers at a time.

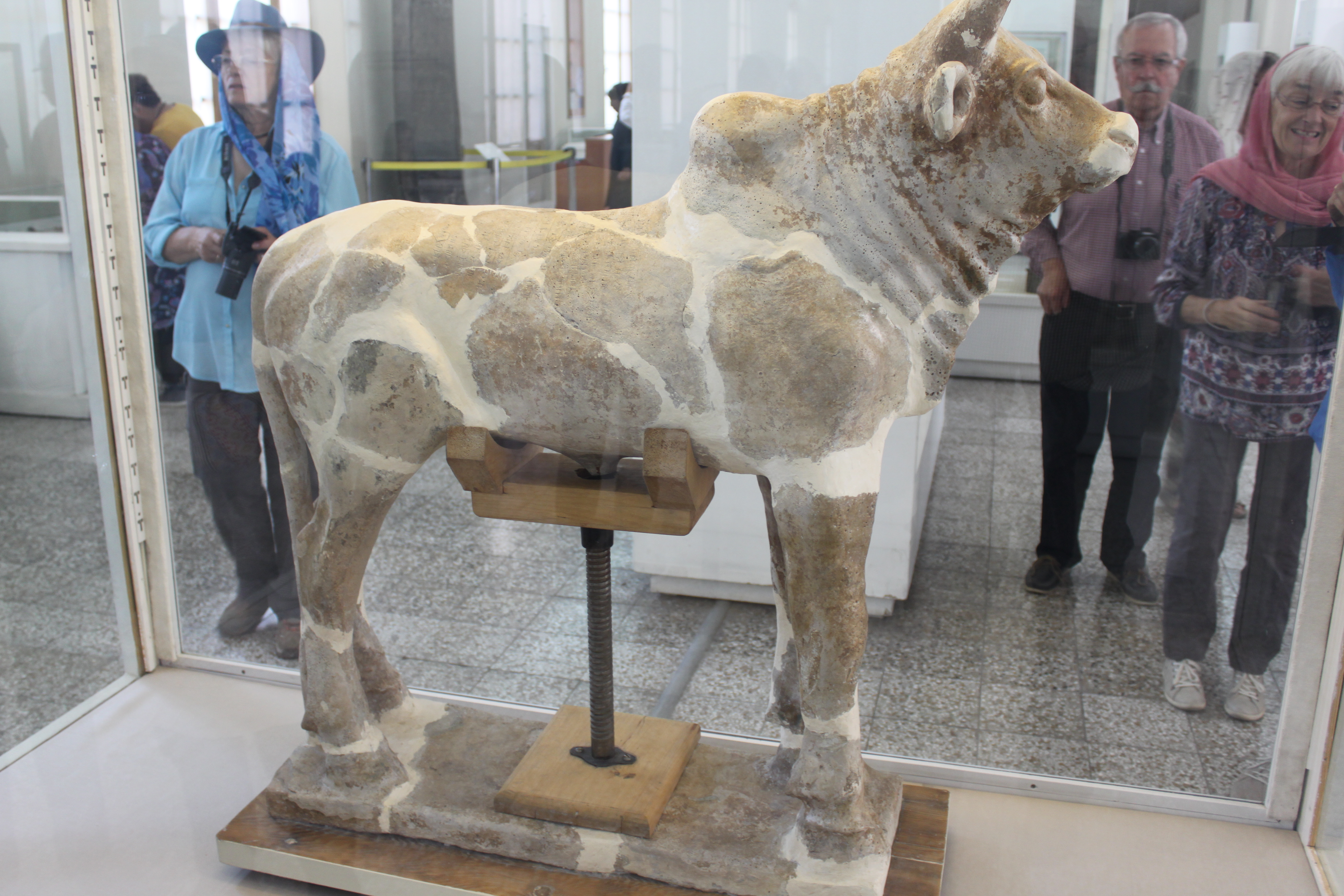
Bull with elamite inscription – Late 2nd millen BC – National museum of Iran – inventory number 3213

Excavations exposed a quadrangle 1,300 ft^{2} (120 m^{2}) wall enclosed sacred area with temples and courtyards. The five stage ziggurat stood at its center, with the corners oriented to the cardinal points. Every 11th level of bricks in the ziggurat was inscribed. Large gates were built into the four sides with three having stairs to the 2nd level and one, the southwest, to the 5th and highest level. At each gate there were half life sized statues, one, of blue-glazed terracotta with an inscription dedicated to the god Inshushinak. Excavation showed that the ziggurat was built in two phases, to the 2nd level first, with two temples, then subsequently to the 5th level. In one of the temples white and black glass tiles were found.

Five tombs were found under rooms in the courtyard. Tomb 1 was apparently never used, Tomb V was robbed out in antiquity, Tomb II contained partially burned remains of five individuals (cremated elsewhere), and Tomb IV, completely undisturbed, contained an adult female between 40–60 years old accompanied by grave goods.

A number of inscribed bricks were found (5,257 in total with most in Elamite but with 67 in Akkadian). One read:

"I, Untaš-Napiriša, son of Humbanumena, king of Anšan and of Susa, anxious for my life to be continually prosperous, so that I may noy be granted the extinction of my prosperous lineage, a temple of baked bricks and a sanctuary of glazed bricks I built; I gave it to Inšušinak of the Siyan-kuk and I a temple tower erected. May what I made and toiled for, as a gift on my behalf, be acceptable to Inšušinak!"

Most recently the site was excavated by Behzad Mofidi Nasrabadi in 1999, 2002, 2004, and 2005. This included a 35 ha (86 acres) magnetometer survey by Kiel University

== Threats ==
Petroleum exploration due to increased global demand threatens the foundations of the site, as various seismic tests have been undertaken to explore for reserves of petroleum. Digging for oil has been undertaken as close as 300 metres (984 ft) away from the ziggurat.

== Gallery ==
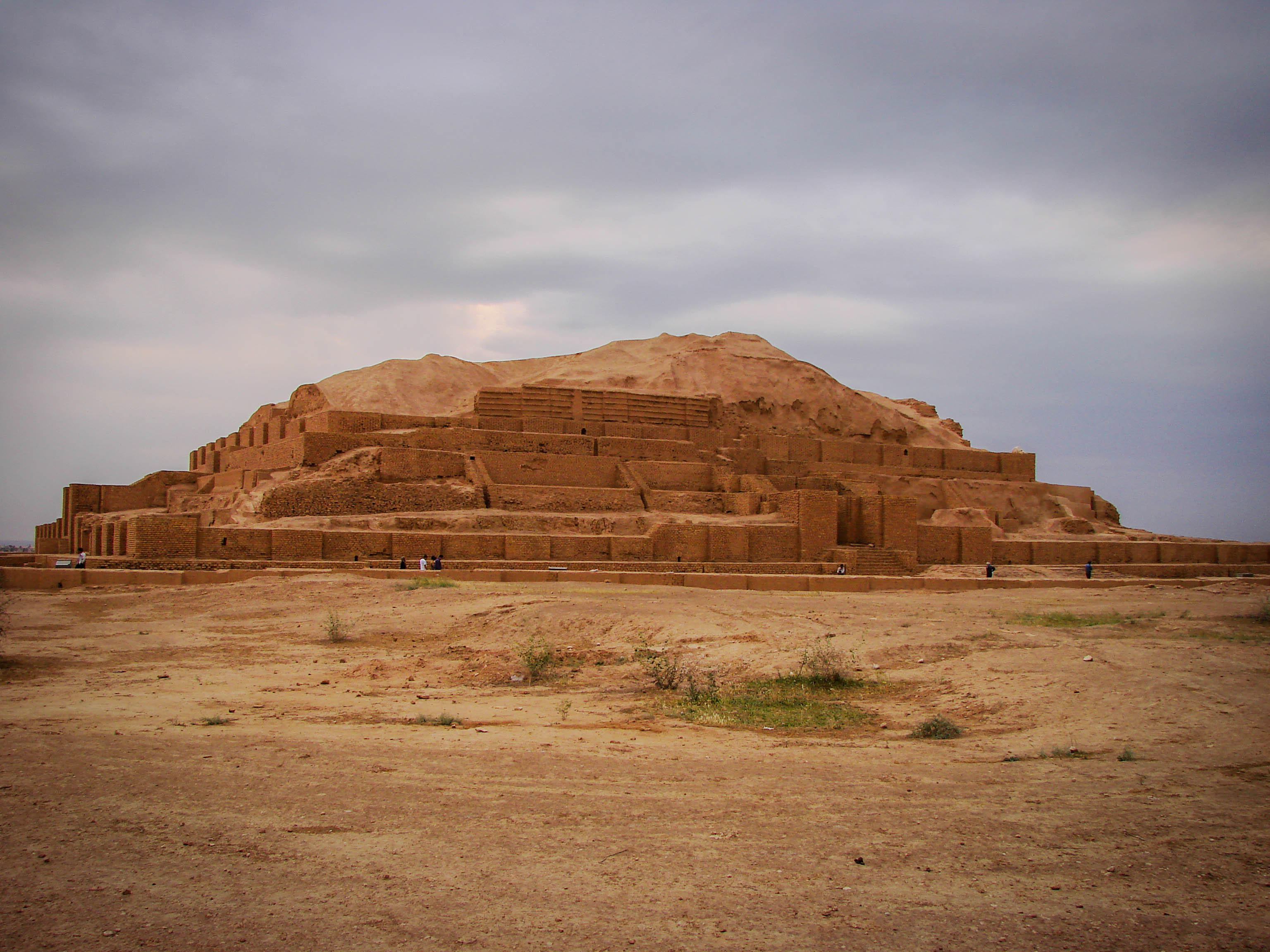
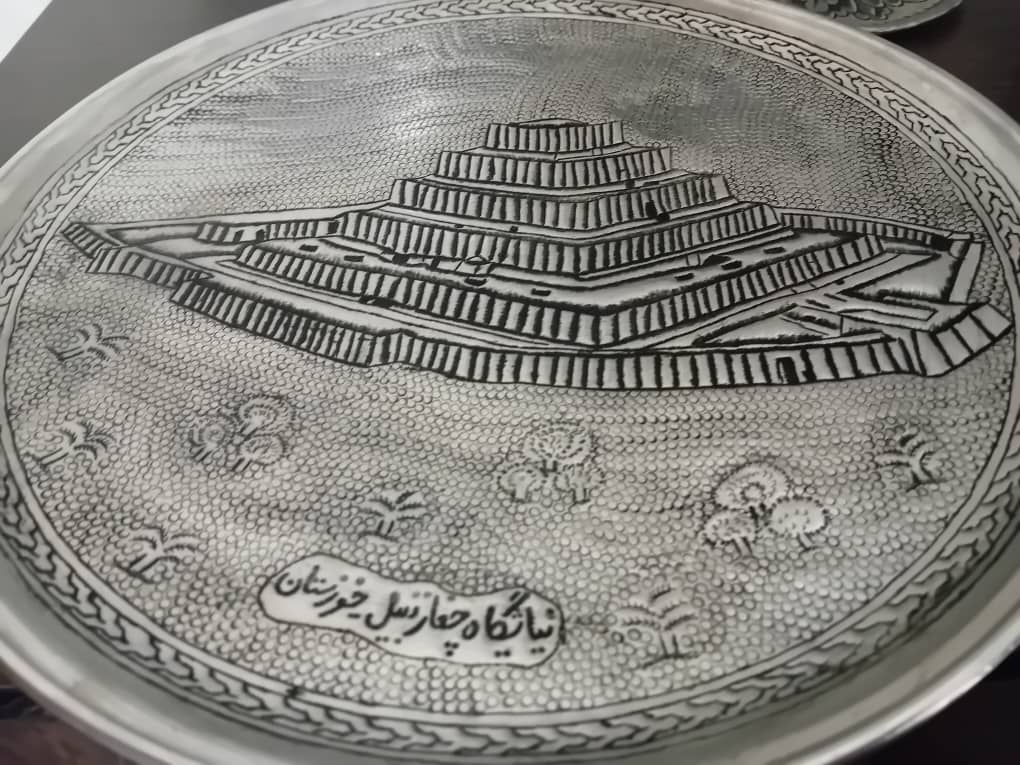
Zigurat of Dur Untash

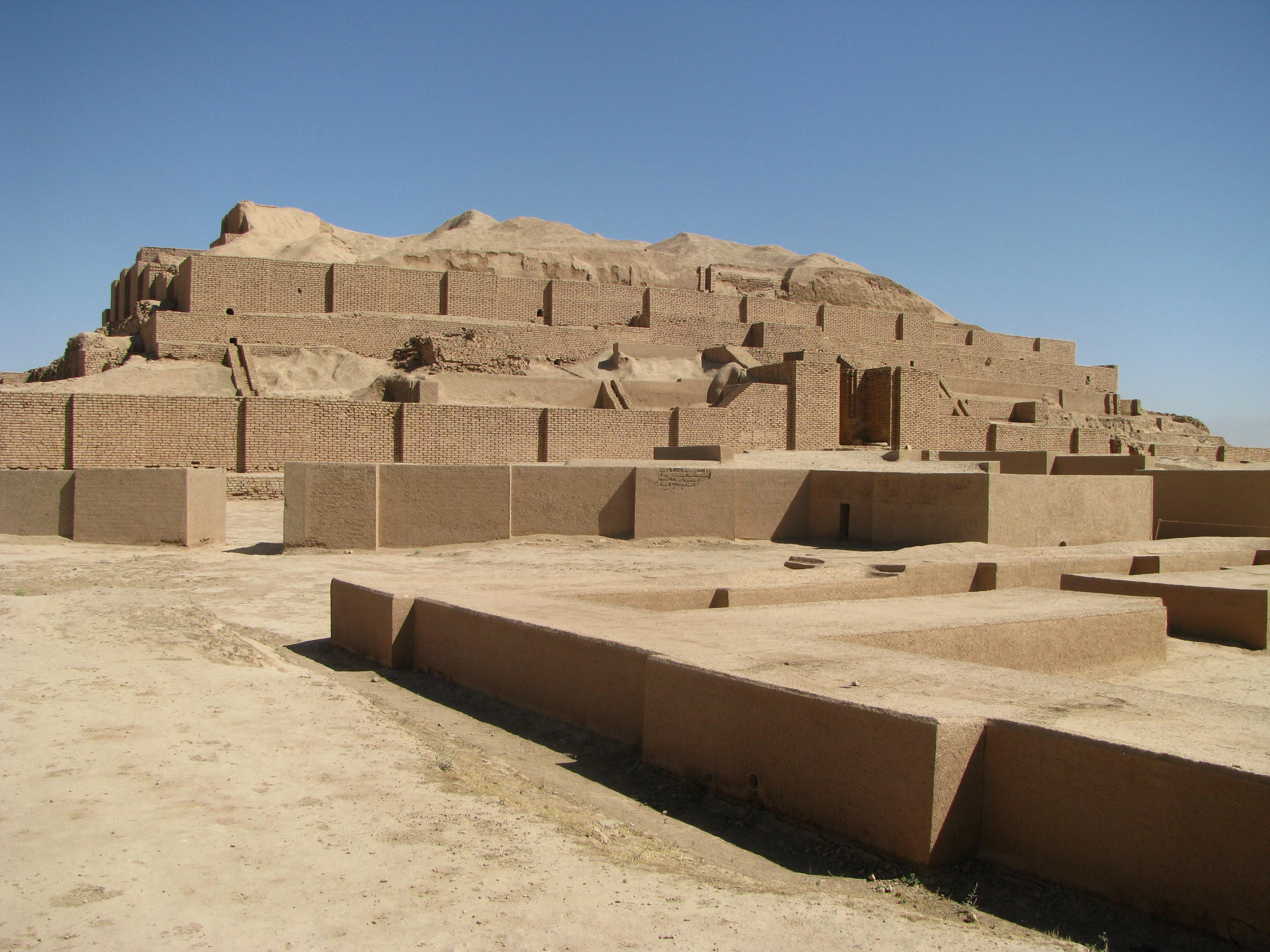
Profile view of Dur Untash Zigurat structure

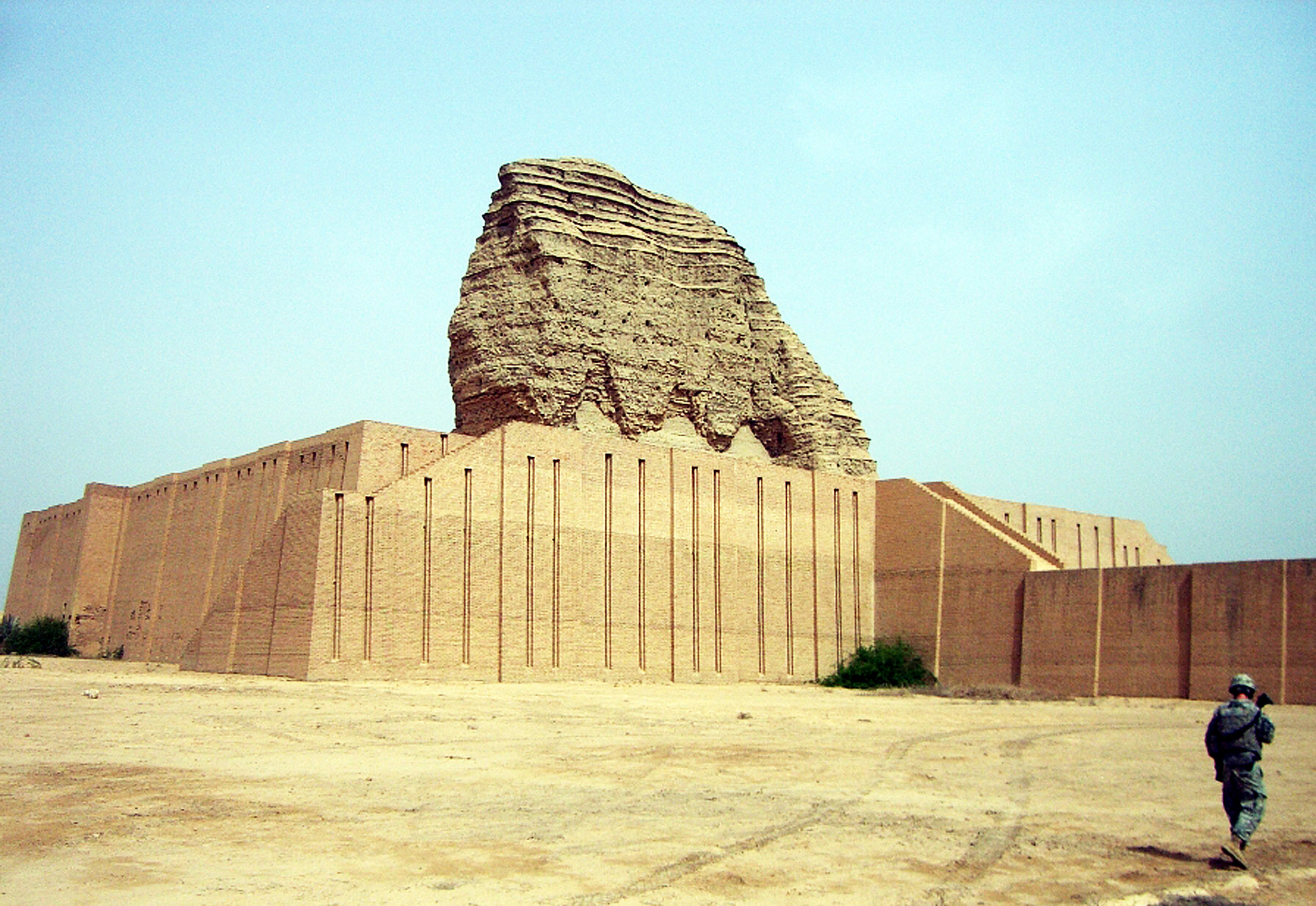
Similar Zigurat structures in Iraq: The ziggurat of Dur-Kurigalzu

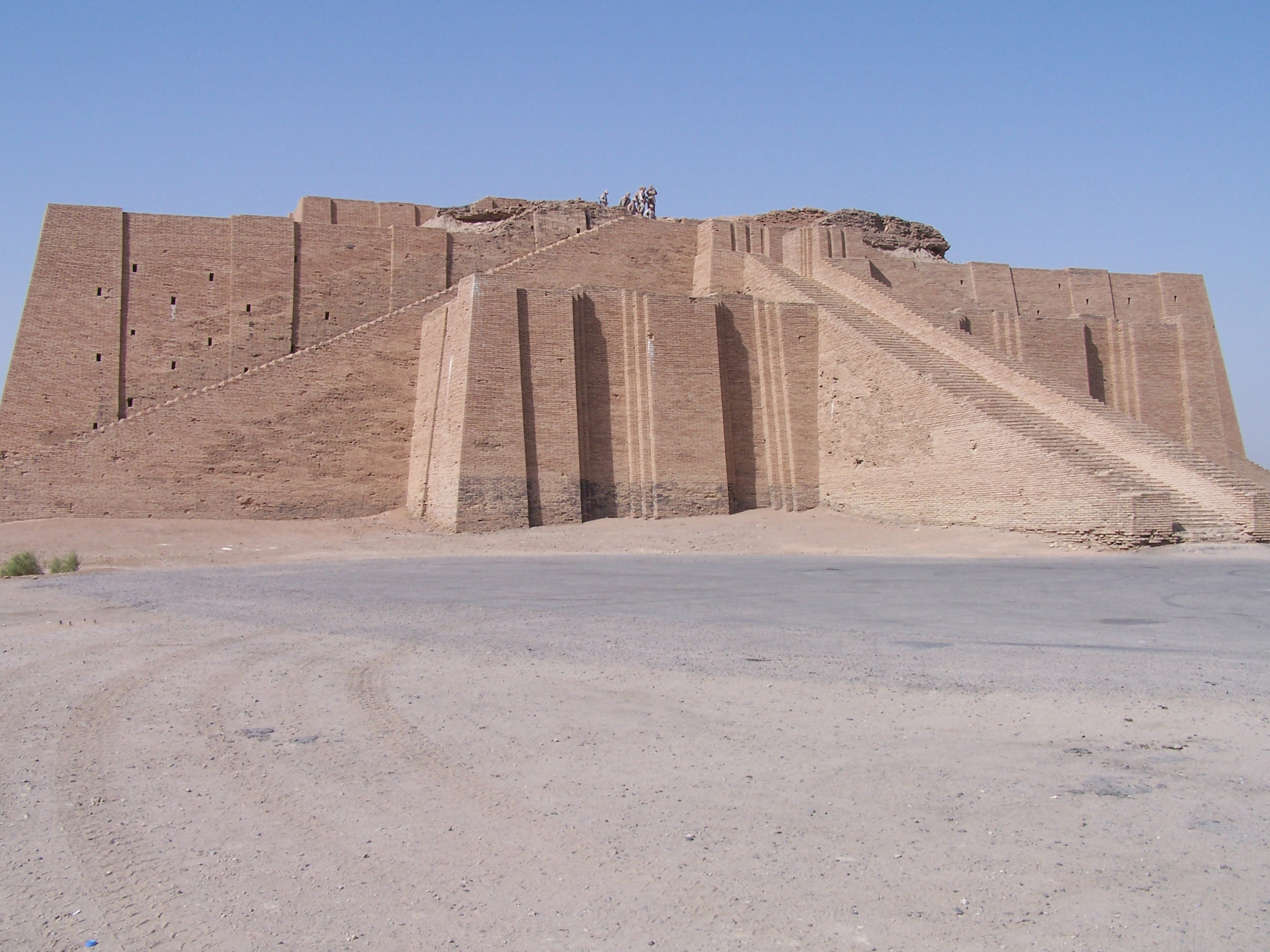
Similar Zigurat structures in Iraq: Ziggurat of Ur

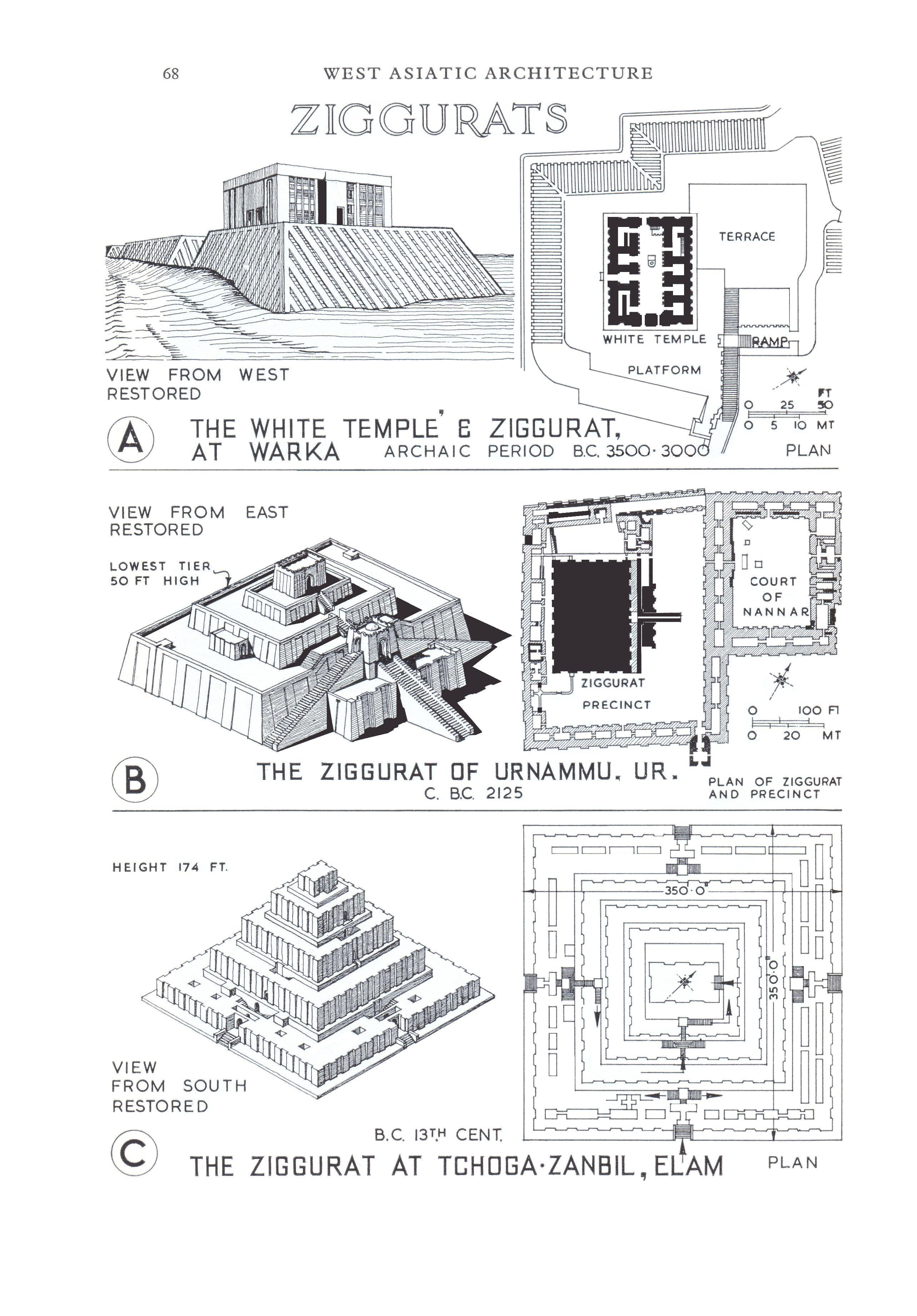
The Ziggurat at Chogha Zanbil is one of the main Ziggurats

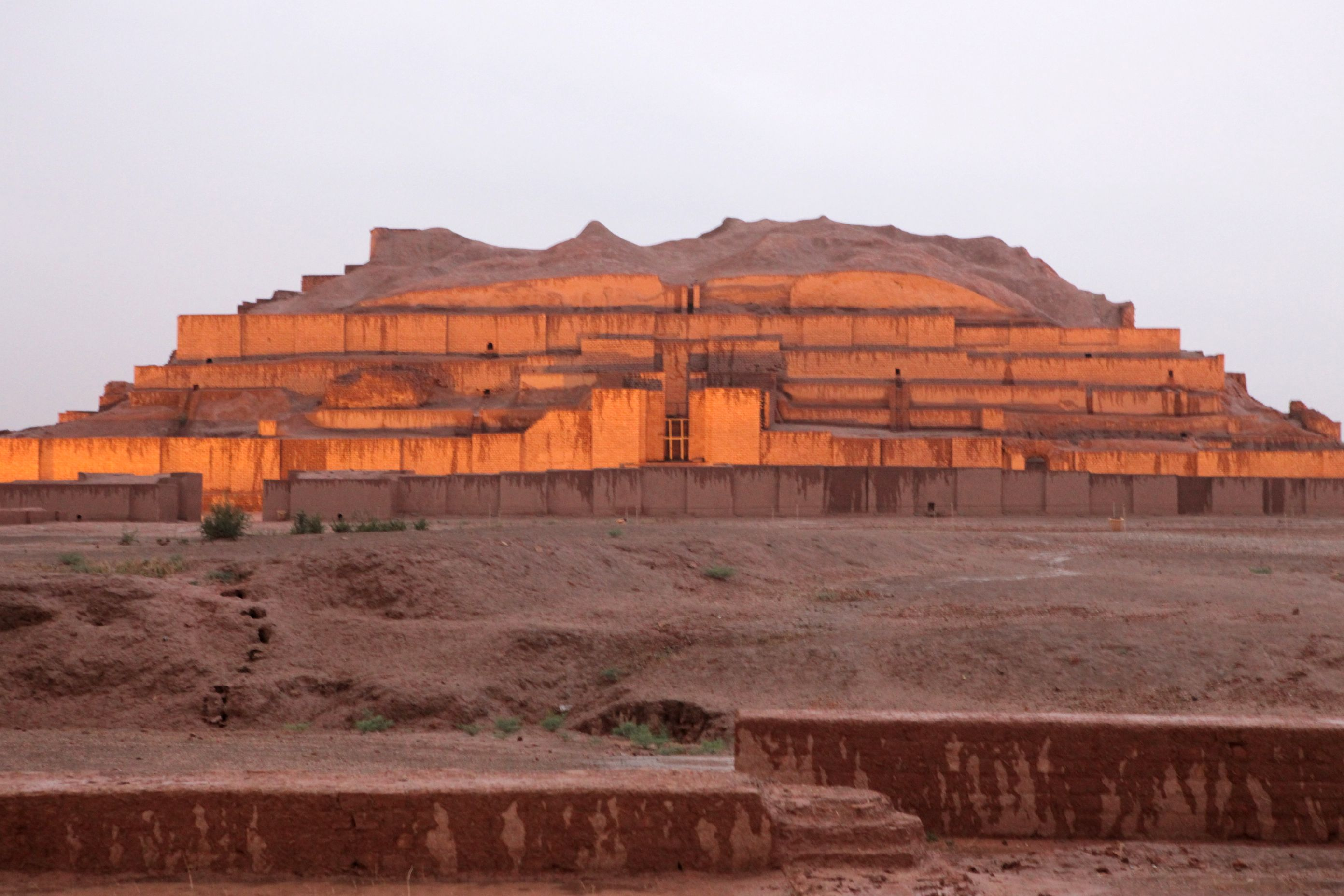

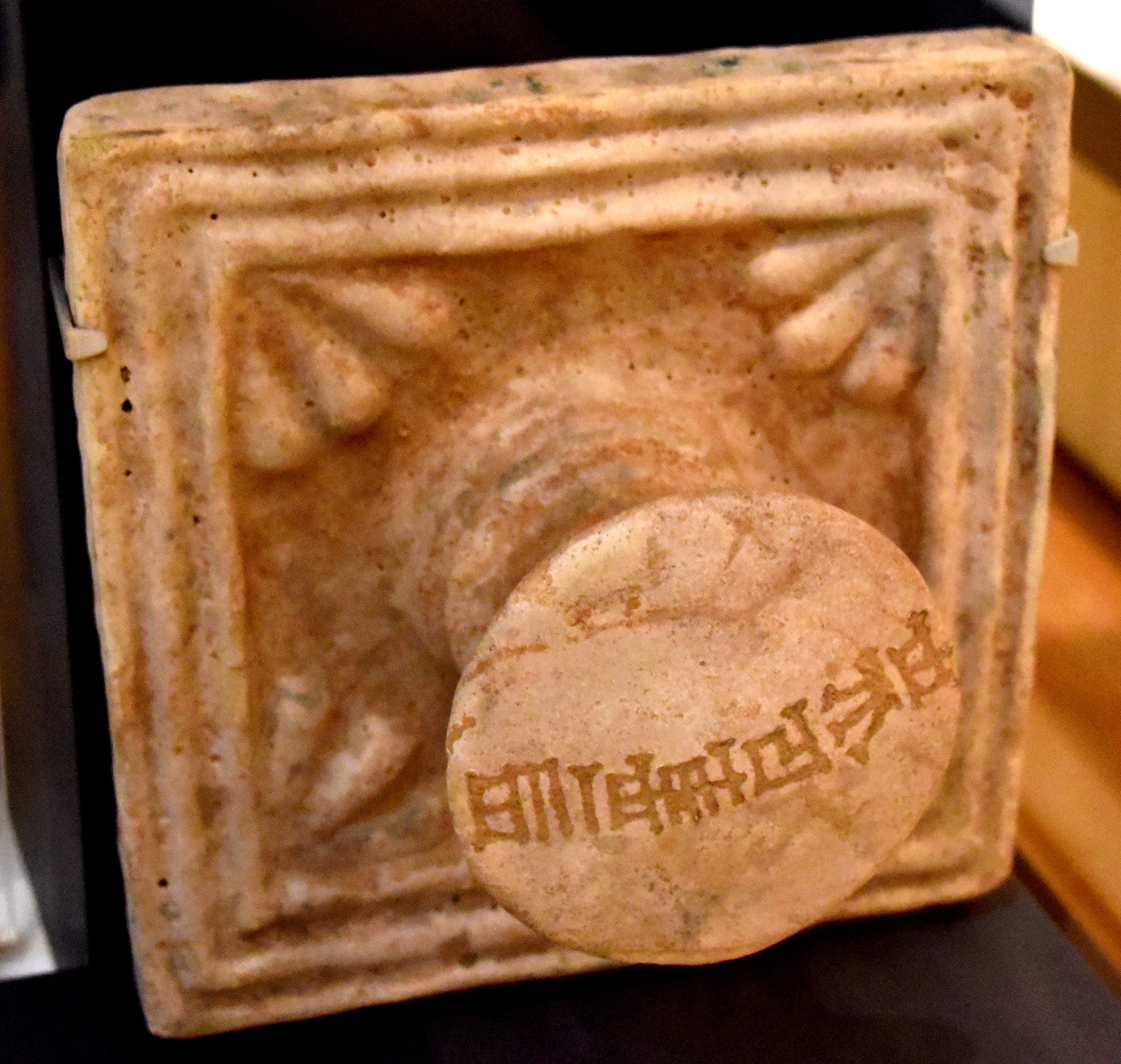
Glazed (originally blue) door plaque with boss. The Elamite cuneiform inscription reads "Palace of Untash-Napirisha, King of Elam". 13th century BCE. From Chogha Zanbil, Iran. British Museum

== See also ==
- Step pyramid
- Iranian architecture
- Cities of the ancient Near East
- Haft Tepe
