= Underworld Vision of an Assyrian Prince =

Ancient Assyrian literature

Underworld Vision of an Assyrian Prince is a Neo-Assyrian text dated to the 7th century BCE. Called the "first tour of hell", it describes a vivid journey to the Underworld taken by Kumma, the Assyrian prince and protagonist of the story. The Underworld Vision is recorded on a single tablet (VAT 10057) excavated from Assur. It is rooted in older Mesopotamian underworld myths such as The Epic of Gilgamesh, although it is also similar to other texts such as Ludlul bēl nēmeqi, and contains Egyptian influences. It has been noted that the story has no parallel in Assyrian texts, and is considered innovative with its use of the "Göttertypentext" format. It has also been suggested that the Underworld Vision influenced later Jewish literature.

== Identity of Kumma ==
There has been attempts to connect Kumma to a real Assyrian king. Ashurbanipal was proposed by Wolfram von Soden, and the scribe mentioned at the end of the text was speculated to be Arad-Gula, a scholar active in the court of Esarhaddon but lost his position during the reign of Ashurbanipal. However, the description of the dead king's deeds matches those of Sennacherib

== Text ==
=== Obverse ===
The beginning of the text is badly damaged. The opening may refer to a divination or an offering, after which an unknown individual begins to hoard wealth and neglect his duty to care for the gods. The unknown individual may have been Kumma's father or Kumma himself. A scribe is introduced in line 17, and then an unknown individual, either the prince or the king, became distressed, wandering the streets and crying in the night. He then went to the temple, made an offering and invoked Allatu, here seemingly synonymous with Ereshkigal. Ereshkigal then appeared in Kumma's dream at night, saying she would hear his prayers, but then claimed that she could not answer and asked why he turned to her instead of Shamash. Von Soden reads that Ereshkigal may have offered Kumma a one-time use of the ability of dream interpretation, which is why she said that she could not help him. Kumma then awakens from his dream, crying and pleaded to Ereshkigal again. Kumma may have insulted Ereshkigal between the dream and after waking up, as Nergal later asked him why he insulted Ereshkigal, Nergal's wife.

=== Reverse ===
The reverse side is better preserved than the obverse side. It begins with Kumma lying down to have a second dream. This section is recounted in first person, from Kumma's point of view. The text begins by talking about the various underworld gods Kumma encountered in the underworld.

First he saw Namtar, the "vizier of the underworld who fashions the visceral omens", standing behind a man. He was holding his hair in his left hand and a daggar on his right hand. Namtartu, described as Namtar's female counterpart, had the head of a protective spirit, and the hands and feet of a human. Kumma then saw death, described as having the head of a MUŠ.ḪUŠ (Mušḫuššu), hands of a human, and the word describing his feet was not preserved. The evil spirit (šēdu lemnu) had the head and hands of a human, a crown on his head, feet of an eagle and was trampling a crocodile with his left foot. Alluhappu had the head of a lion and human hands and feet. The "Upholder of Evil" had the head of a bird, hands and feet of a human, and was described as flying with wings. Humuṭ-tabal, the boatman of the underworld, had the head of Anzu, and his hands and feet were not preserved. The Ghost had the head of an ox, and hands and feet of Anzu. Šulak was a lion that stood on his hind legs (and is known elsewhere as a lurker of bathrooms). Oath (mamitu) had the head of a goat. Nedu, described as the gatekeeper of the underworld, had the head of a lion, hands of a human and feet of a bird. Anything/total evil (mimma lemnu) had two heads, one being the head of lion, and the second head was not preserved. Muhra had three feet, the two front ones being those of a bird and the rear one being a bull, and he had terrifying splendor (melammu). Kumma also saw two gods that he did not recognize; one had the head, hands and feet of Anzu was holding something in his left hand, and the other had the head of a man and was wearing a crown. All in all, Kumma counted fifteen gods and then saluted all of them. He then saw a man with a pitch black body with a face resembling Anzu dressed in red who was holding a bow in his left hand and a dagger in his right, and trampling on a snake with his left foot.

Kumma then saw Nergal, seated on his throne and holding two maces. Lightning was flashing and the gods of the underworld all kneeled. Nergal then proceeded to grab Kumma by his hair, causing Kumma to shiver in fear and kneel down. Nergal would have killed the crown prince if not for the timely intervention of Nergal's vizier, Ishum, who convinced Nergal to spare Kumma. Nergal then asked why he insulted Ereshkigal, although no response was given. Nergal promises to let him go, but threatens annihilation if he dares forget him. He then shows Kumma the corpse of the king, his father, telling him that the king fulfilled his duty and is protected along with his successors and army.

Kumma wakes up and the narrative switches back to third person. He runs outside and laments his fate in front of the public, and praised Nergal and Ereshkigal for coming to his aid. A scribe who overheard Kumma then reported this to the palace, either out of loyalty or to atone for corruption.

== Similarities to other texts ==
=== Göttertypentext ===
The passage in the Underworld Vision where Kumma described the inhabitants of the underworld uses a similar structure to the Göttertypentext. The Göttertypentext describes twenty-seven divine statues from head to toe, in descriptive detail, and then gives the name of the being described. The Underworld Vision reverses the structure by first giving the name before describing them, albeit in less detail and only describing their heads, hands and feet. Johannes Bach explains how this can be an example of hypertextual Transtextuality. This section in the Underworld Vision can be considered a derivative of the Göttertypentext, being narrated in first person, describing the actual gods instead of statues.

=== Epic of Gilgamesh ===
Outside of both Underworld Vision and tablet twelve of Gilgamesh offering a tour of hell, specific references to the Epic of Gilgamesh could be found in the Underworld Vision.

In his second dream Kumma, after saluting to the underworld gods, described seeing a man with a black body and the face of the Anzû, dressed in red, holding a bow in one hand and a dagger in the other and trampling on a snake.

"There was a man, his body black as pitch, his face resembling that of Anzû; he was clad in red armour. In his left hand he carried a bow, in his right hand he wielded a dagger, while he trampled on a snake with his left foot."

Enkidu in tablet seven of Epic of Gilgamesh describes a similar man in his dream, before he physically died.

"There was a young man, whose face was obscured. His face was that of an Anzu-bird. He had the paws of a lion, he had the claws of an eagle. He seized me by my locks, using great force against me. I hit him, and he jumped like a keppū-toy, he hit me and forced me down like an [onager(?)], like a wild bull he trampled on me, he squeezed my whole body. (I cried out:) "Save me, my friend, don't desert me!" But you were afraid, and did not [help me(?)], you [......]. [He hit me and] turned me into a dove. [......] my arms, like a bird. He seized me, drove me down to the dark house, dwelling of Erkalla's god."

While this is not a complete match as the man Enkidu described had the hands of a lion and claws of an eagle, the wording in both texts are the same or with slight variations, suggesting that the scribe was familiar with the Epic of Gilgamesh. However unlike Enkidu, who died soon after his dream of entering the underworld, Kumma lived after Nergal let him go. Another connection with the Epic of Gilgamesh is the description of death. In the Epic of Gilgamesh, Utnapishtim comments on the unseen nature of death.

"Nobody sees Death, nobody sees the face of Death, nobody hears the voice of Death. Savage Death just cuts mankind down."

However, Kumma described the physical appearance of death in the Underworld Vision, contradicting the Epic of Gilgamesh in a somewhat humorous way.

"Death had the head of a dragon, his hands were human, his feet [...]."

=== Apocalyptic literature ===
It has been suggested that the Underworld Vision is a forerunner to apocalyptic literature. The Biblical Book of Ezekiel in general is recognized to have Mesopotamian influences, and the description of the underworld in Ezekiel can be explained by Mesopotamian literature such as the Underworld Vision. Similarities between Daniel 7 and the Underworld Vision were also pointed out.

== Other similarities and influences ==
The description of the inhabitants of the underworld is noted to fit Egyptian New Kingdom artistic depictions of the underworld, and some of the gods described could be traced to Egyptian influences. For example, the evil spirit was described to be trampling on a crocodile, which is not native to Mesopotamia but well known in Egypt. Another example is the reference to the Egyptian smiting scene in Namtar, who was grasping someone's head by their hair in one hand and holding a dagger in the other. The smiting scene is a well known artistic motif beginning from the Narmer Palette, spreading to the Levant but seldomly attested in Assyria.

Some of the underworld gods described also fit the guardian figures depicted in Assyrian palaces. The evil spirit and Nedu both had lion heads, human hands, and bird-like feet, which fit the ugallu, seen from Sennacherib's and Ashurbanipal's reliefs.
