= Ishmekarab =

Mesopotamian and Elamite deity

Ishmekarab (Išmekarab) or Ishnikarab (Išnikarab) was a Mesopotamian deity of justice. The name is commonly translated from Akkadian as "he heard the prayer," but Ishmekarab's gender is uncertain and opinions of researchers on whether the deity was male or female vary.

In Mesopotamia Ishmekarab was worshiped as a member of various groups of judge deities, including the "standing god of Ebabbar" and as part of the group of "divine judges" attested in Assyria from between the period of Erishum I's reign and the era of the Neo-Assyrian Empire. Many attestations are also known from Susa in Elam, where a number of deities of Mesopotamian origin were worshiped.

== Character ==
Ishmekarab was a deity of justice, described as a divine judge and in some cases invoked in legal formulas. In this role, as well as in that of an oath deity, Ishmekarab could be associated with Shamash. A curse formula from Susa written in Akkadian mentions the scepter of Ishmekarab as a symbolic deterrent against altering the text it was a part of. Similarly, oath breakers were said to risk having their skull smashed by this weapon. A seal inscription from Susa indicates that Ishmekarab was also believed to repel the utukku demons, not otherwise attested in texts from that city.

In Susa, Ishmekarab was associated with Inshushinak and Lagamal. Nathan Wasserman refers to Lagamal and Ishmekarab as a couple. Wouther Henkelman assumes that during judgment in the afterlife attested in texts from Susa, Ishmekarab played the role of advocatus dei, in contrast with Lagamal, who he identifies as advocatus diaboli. Wilfred G. Lambert notes that despite a possible association with the underworld present in so-called Susa funerary texts, Ishmekarab should not be regarded as an underworld deity, and generally appears to be a deity dwelling elsewhere, above ground.

It is possible that a minor deity depicted alongside a god on a snake throne (Inshushinak or Napirisha) on Elamite cylinder seals can be identified as Ishmekarab.

=== Gender ===
Milad Jahangirfar notes that the gender of Ishmekarab is uncertain, and there is no consensus among researchers regarding this topic.

Wilfred G. Lambert describes the view that Ishmekarab was female as "common but unfounded." He notes that while the verb forms used to describe the actions of Ishmekarab and Lagamal in the so-called "Susa funerary texts" do leave the possibility that they were not two gods but a god and a goddess, there is no clear evidence otherwise. Manfred Krebernik also considers Ishmekarab to be a male deity, and translates the name accordingly with the masculine pronoun as "he heard the prayer" ("Er erhörte das Gebet"). De Graef recently translated a seal dating to the Sukkalmah period as reading "Ishmekarab, king of the city of Susa," and Tavernier, who already believed Ishmekarab to be male, considers this convincing proof that Ishmekarab was a god and not a goddess.

However, other scholars see Ishmekarab as female. For example Florence Malbran-Labat, although recognizing that Ishmekarab being a goddess is disputed, considers Ishmekarab to be a goddess, and possibly the spouse of Inshushinak. This view is also supported by Daniel T. Potts, who refers to Ishmekarab as the "lady of the siyan kuk" ("sacred precinct") at Chogha Zanbil. Wasserman appears to believe that Ishmekarab and Lagamal were a couple.

== Worship ==
Ishmekarab is attested for the first time as a member of an Assyrian group of judge deities known as the seven devine judges who resided in the step gate of Assur, mentioned on a tablet from Kanesh, a copy of an inscription of king Erishum I. Balkan and Landsberger considered the possibility that the two references to the "words on the stele" in Old Assyrian lawsuit texts refers to the stele of Erishum which was most likely erected at the step gate near the divine judges mentioned in the inscription, although Veenhof believes the evidence to be lacking.

The later Assyrian Divine Directory/Götteraddressbuch mentions the house of the divine judges, which lists ten judges (in comparison to Erishum's seven.) Neo-Assyrian tākultu texts also name the divine judges fragmentarily. While the members are not identical in these three sources, Ishmekarab is present in all three, though with some variance in the spelling of the name, rendered respectively as ^{d}Iš-me-kà-ra-áb, ^{d}Iš-me-ka-ra-ba and ^{d}Iš-me-ka-ra-bu. In the inscription of Erishum, the remaining judges are Misharu ("justice"), Se-raggu ("Get out, criminal"), Ulli-mesharam ("he extolled justice"), Ashur-hablam ("watch over the downtrodden"), Pushu-ken ("his speech is just") and Ishmelum ("god has heard"). Later sources include deities such as Hip-raggu ("break the criminal") or Tishamme-pe-mukarribe ("listen to the word of the supplicant"). Tavernier also points out that the names of some of the other gods listed as divine judges in Assyria had similar meanings to Ishmekarab.

The divine judges is also mentioned in other Assyrian texts, such as an inscription by Adad-nirari I who refers to the gate of the judges. Penalty clauses in Neo-Assyrian sales documents also invoked the divine judges, in that the case of anyone who breaks the contract would not be heard by them.

The god list An = Anum mentions a group of divine judges referred to as the "standing gods of Ebabbar," one of whom was Ishmekarab, in this case spelled ^{d}Iš-me-kár-ab. Two temples bearing the name Ebabbar (Sumerian: "shining white house") existed, one in Sippar and another in Larsa, both dedicated to Shamash and his wife Aya. The "standing gods" were associated with the latter location.

=== In Elam ===
Ishmekarab was introduced to Elam at an uncertain point in time, most likely in the Old Babylonian period. According to Wouter Henkelman, Ishmekarab and Lagamal appeared in that area roughly at the same time. The Elamite spellings of the name include ^{d}Iš-né-ka-ra-ap and ^{d}Iš-né-ka-ra-ab.

Ishmekarab is attested in many Akkadian theophoric names from Susa from the Sukkalmah period. Examples include Ishmekarab-ili and Ishmekarab-ma-ilum. A single text refers to Ishmekarab as lugal Šušim, "king of Susa." However, in another similar formula it was a title of Inshushinak. Impressions of cylinder seal inscriptions mentioning Ishmekarab are known not only from this city, but also Haft Tepe, identified with ancient Kabnak. However, no attestations are known from texts from Malamir, located further east.

One inscription from the temple of Ishmekarab from Susa is regarded as particularly historically noteworthy due to being the first attestation of the use of the Elamite term siyan to refer to a temple in that city. In this text, written in Akkadian, king Tempti-Agun states that he built a temple dedicated to this deity for the sake of his family, including his deceased mother Welkisha.

Untash-Napirisha built a temple of Ishmekarab in Susa. Another was built as a part of the Chogha Zanbil complex, next to these belonging to Nabu and the pair Kiririsha and Napirisha. Shutruk-Nahhunte also built some sort of structure dedicated to Ishmekarab as a "gift," but his inscription mentioning this contains no precise identification of its nature or location. According to an inscription of king Hutelutush-Inshushinak from Susa, another temple of Ishmekarab, surrounded by a sacred grove, existed in Kipû, a city whose location is presently unknown. This type of houses of worship is known as siyan husame. While many of them were dedicated to deities connected to the afterlife, this association does not appear to be exclusive, as deities such as Manzat and Simut, who had no such connections, also were worshiped in own siyan husame.

Shilhak-Inshushinak was most likely particularly devoted to Ishmekarab, referring to this deity as "my god" (Elamite: na-pír-ú-ri). He also named one of his daughters Ishmekarab-huhun.

Ishmekarab was still worshiped in Elam in the neo-Elamite period.

== Later relevance ==
A well established theory connects the Elamite group of Inshushinak, Lagamal and Ishme-karab with the later Zoroastrian belief that after death souls are judged by Mithra, Sraosha and Rashnu. However, this view is not universally accepted, and it has been pointed out that while the names of both Sraosha and Ishmekarab are etymologically connected to hearing, the natures of Rashnu and Lagamal do not appear to be similar. Nathan Wasserman additionally questions if these three gods can be strictly considered a triad in the same way as the Zoroastrian judges.
