= Shilhina-hamru-Lagamar =

Elamite ruler from the Shutrukid dynasty

Šilhina-Ḫamru-Lagamar
- King of Anshan and Susa

King of Elam
- Predecessor: Hutelutush-Inshushinak
- Successor: Uncertain succession due to lack of evidence
- Dynasty: Shutrukid
- Father: Hutelutush-Inshushinak

Shilhina-hamru-Lagamar was an Elamite ruler from the Shutrukid dynasty, holding the title of "king of Anshan and Susa." Son of Hutelutush-Inshushinak, Shilhina-hamru-Lagamar inherited an Elamite realm on the verge of destruction, which had been raided extensively by Nebuchadnezzar I of Babylon.

The political situation in Elam during the reign of Shilhina-hamru-Lagamar suggests that the central authority in Elam was already failing due to the late effects of the Bronze Age Collapse which saw the fall of many urbanized states in the Near East.

The name Shilhina-hamru-Lagamar is a theophoric name invoking the Mesopotamian underworld deity Lagamal. Shilhina-hamru-Lagamar is invoked in the texts of Hutelutush-Inshushinak, as well as other royals of the time and the Elamite deities Napirisha, Kiririsha, Inshushinak, and Shimut. He also appears in the inscriptions of the Neo-Elamite king Shutruk-Nahhunte II.

| Preceded by Hutelutush-Inshushinak | King of Elam c. 1100 BC | Succeeded by uncertain |
