= Inshushinak =

Tutelary god of Susa

- Tutelary deity of Susa, god of justice and the underworld
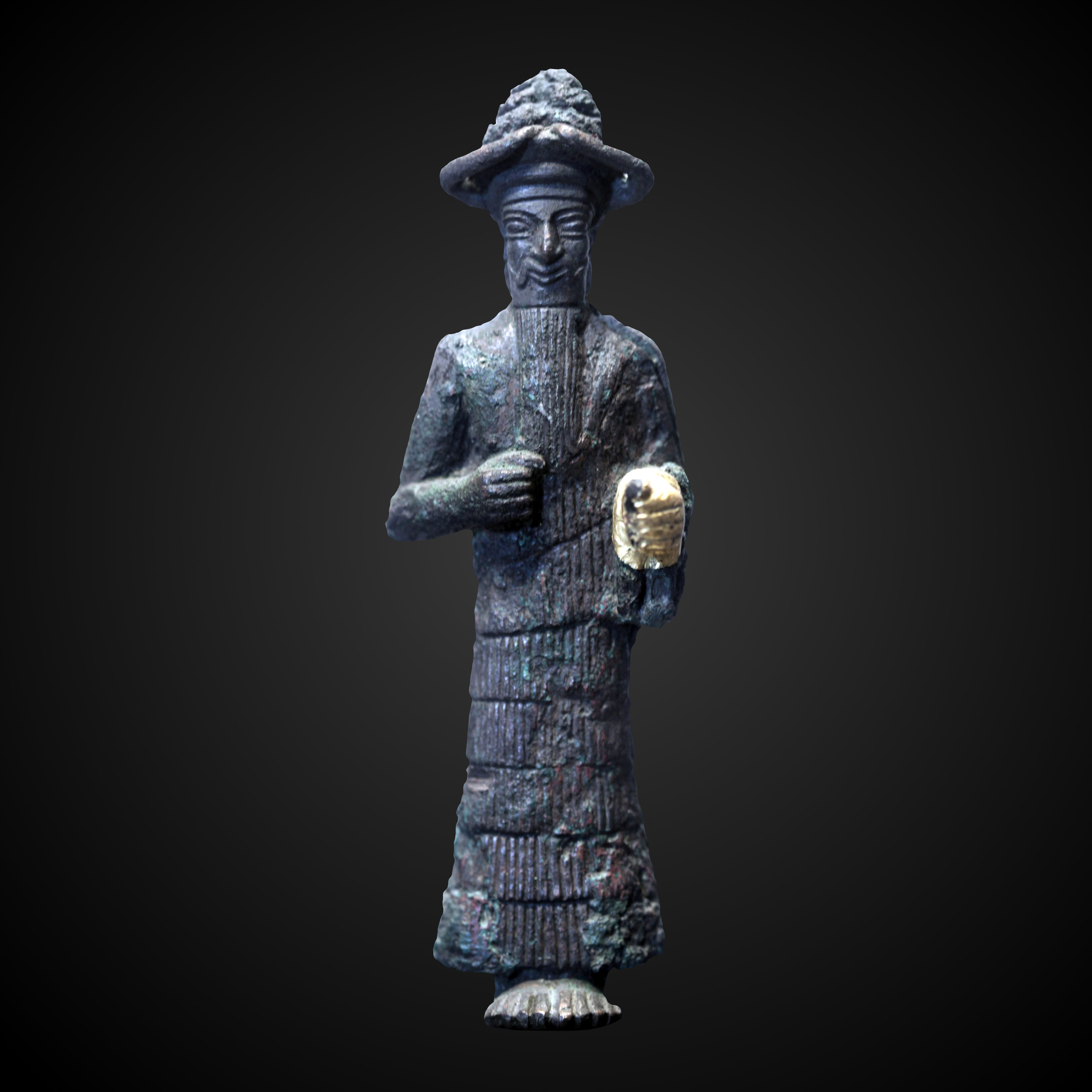
- Figure of a smiling god, possibly Inshushinak, from Susa.
- Major cult center: Susa
- Abode: underworld
- Symbol: snake (possibly)

Equivalents
- Mesopotamian: Ninurta

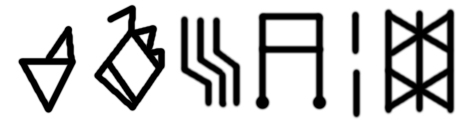
Inshushinak (also Šušinak, Šušun; Linear Elamite: Insušinak, Cuneiform: 𒀭𒈹𒂞 ^{d}Inšušinak) was the tutelary god of the city of Susa in Elam. His name has a Sumerian etymology, and can be translated as "lord of Susa". He was associated with kingship, and as a result appears in the names and epithets of multiple Elamite rulers. In Susa he was the main god of the local pantheon, though his status in other parts of Elam might have been different. He was also connected with justice and the underworld. His iconography is uncertain, though it is possible snakes were his symbolic animals. Two Mesopotamian deities incorporated into Elamite tradition, Lagamal and Ishmekarab, were regarded as his assistants. He was chiefly worshiped in Susa, where multiple temples dedicated to him existed. Attestations from other Elamite cities are less common. He is also attested in Mesopotamian sources, where he could be recognized as an underworld deity or as an equivalent of Ninurta. He plays a role in the so-called Susa Funerary Texts, which despite being found in Susa were written in Akkadian and might contain instructions for the dead arriving in the underworld.

== Name ==
Inshushinak's name can be translated as "lord of Susa". It is a loanword which originated in Sumerian, with apheresis, otherwise rarely attested in this language, resulting in the shift from ^{d}nin-šušinak to Inshushinak. (Note: It is often assumed that the name Inanna similarly developed through the loss of the first vowel in a theonym which initially started with the same sign, nin-an-ak, though this view is not universally accepted.) As suggested by Frans Wiggermann, Inshushinak's name might have originally developed in the Uruk period, when according to him Mesopotamians established a colony in Susa. He proposes that alongside Ninazu, Ningishzida, Ishtaran and Tishpak he can be considered one of the members of a category of deities he refers to as the "Transtigridian snake gods", who likely developed on the border between the cultural spheres of Mesopotamia and Elam.

The most common spelling of Inshushinak's name in cuneiform was ^{d}In-šu-ši-na-ak, though other phonetic syllabic variants such as ^{d}In-su-uš-na-ak, In-sú-uš-nak, ^{d}In-šu-uš-na-ak and Šu-ši-na-ak are also attested, in addition to logographic ones. A well attested example of the latter is ^{d}MÚŠ. In Neo-Elamite sources the variant ^{d}MÚŠ.LAM is attested, with the last sign presumed to be derived from the Akkadian term lammu, used to designate the underworld. Further logographic spellings include ^{d}MÚŠ.EREN, ^{d}NIN.MÚŠ.EREN and ^{d}MÚŠ.ḪU.LAM.

Due to the name occurring in Linear Elamite as i-n-su-š-na-k/k_{2} or i-n-su-ši-na-k/k_{2} and in Cuneiform from the first half of the 2nd Millenium BC as in-su/su_{2}-uš-na-ak, Desset et al. suggests that the Elamite pronunciation of the name, at least in Old Elamite, was Insuš(i)nak, with the i vowel being lost in vowel reduction. The name was spelled as Insušnak already in some Linear Elamite inscriptions by Puzur-Inshushinak, meaning the pronunciation goes back to Puzur-Inshushinak’s time. The Akkadian pronunciation/spelling of the name is attested as Šušinak in texts from the Old Babylonian period onwards, along with Sušinak from Puzur-Inshushinak’s name.

== Character ==
=== Tutelary god of Susa ===
It is assumed that Inshushinak's original role was that of tutelary god of Susa. He was also the main deity of the local pantheon, the ruler of the gods. He was also considered a royal god by Elamite rulers. An early Elamite source, the treaty with Naram-Sin of Akkad, states that "to the god Inshushinak a king is subject" (Inšušinak hurtur zukir), while in later times he was frequently invoked in royal theophoric names and epithets. For example, Atta-hushu referred to himself as the "shepherd of Inshushinak". Shutrukids commonly used the title "(king) whose kingdom Inshushinak loves". Multiple rulers dedicated new construction projects to Inshushinak. Jan Tavernier argues Inshushinak was initially elevated to a high position by Puzur-Inshushinak, and states that through history it reflected the political position of Susa, similarly to how the changes in the position of Marduk in Babylonia reflected the fate of the city of Babylon. Wouter Henkelman states that while Inshushinak's primacy was recognized across the Elamite lowlands around Susa, Elamite religion, like other ancient religions, should be understood as a "patchwork of local traditions", and as a result further east Humban and Napirisha were more commonly recognized as deities of comparable status instead. An inscription of Shilhak-Inshushinak refers to Inshushinak as the "greatest of gods" (or "great among the gods"; rišar nappapir), though the same epithet is also applied to Humban in this text. Katrin De Graef suggests that an oath from the Sukkalmah period (c. 1880-1450 BCE; roughly contemporary with the Old Babylonian period) which invokes Napirisha before Inshushinak might indicate that at the time Susa was a dependence of Anshan, where the former was recognized as the main deity.

Inshushinak was strongly associated with the acropolis (alumelu, a loanword from Akkadian ālu elû, "high city") of Susa, its most elevated section, and he could be accordingly referred to as its lord (temti alimelu). An inscription from a stele of Shilhak-Inshushinak invoked him under this title and implored him to listen to his prayers and grant him his various requests. (Note: The same ruler implored the deceased Kuk-Kirwaš of the Sukkalmah dynasty to intercede with Inshushinak on his behalf.)

=== God of justice ===
Another well attested aspect of Inshushinak's character was his role as a divine judge, which exemplified his connection to justice. In the Sukkalmah period he frequently appears in oath formulas in economic and legal documents alongside Ishmekarab. Sources from the same period also state that parties in agreements committed themselves to them by touching the kidinnu (Akkadian) or kitin (Elamite) of this god. This term is variously translated as "god-given royal power", "divinely-enforced legal protection", "legal authority", "legal order, rules" or "divine symbol, emblem". Its meaning is ultimately uncertain, though as pointed out by De Graef, it is possible that it was represented symbolically by a statue or an emblem, as indicated by the references to touching it. In the Neo-Elamite period the concept of kitin started to appear in royal inscription too, and one such text, attributed to Shutruk-Nahhunte, invokes Inshushinak as the deity responsible for bestowing kitin alongside the king.

=== Underworld god ===
Inshushinak was also associated with the underworld and textual sources from Susa indicate that he was believed to reside in it. He was considered its lord in local tradition as well. Furthermore, his judicial authority was believed to extend to the land of the dead. However, it is not certain if he was recognized as the god of the underworld in the entirety of Elam, and it is possible individual areas had their own deities fulfilling an analogous role in local pantheons. Jan Tavernier notes an analogous role has been proposed for Kiririsha in Liyan and for Upurkupak in Choga Pahn, though he stresses this remains speculative. In the Neo-Elamite period, Inshushinak's underworld aspect apparently overshadowed all his other functions. He could be referred to as temti kukunnum lahakra, which is commonly translated as "lord of the dead in the kukunnum", a type of temple. However, Yasmina Wicks points out that the Elamite word stem laha- can also be translated as "hidden" or "secret", and it is not certain that epithets including it necessarily designated a given deity as related to the underworld; even in Inshushinak's case it might have been used to refer to his other qualities. On this basis she translates it as "the lord who is hidden in the kukkunum".

== Iconography ==
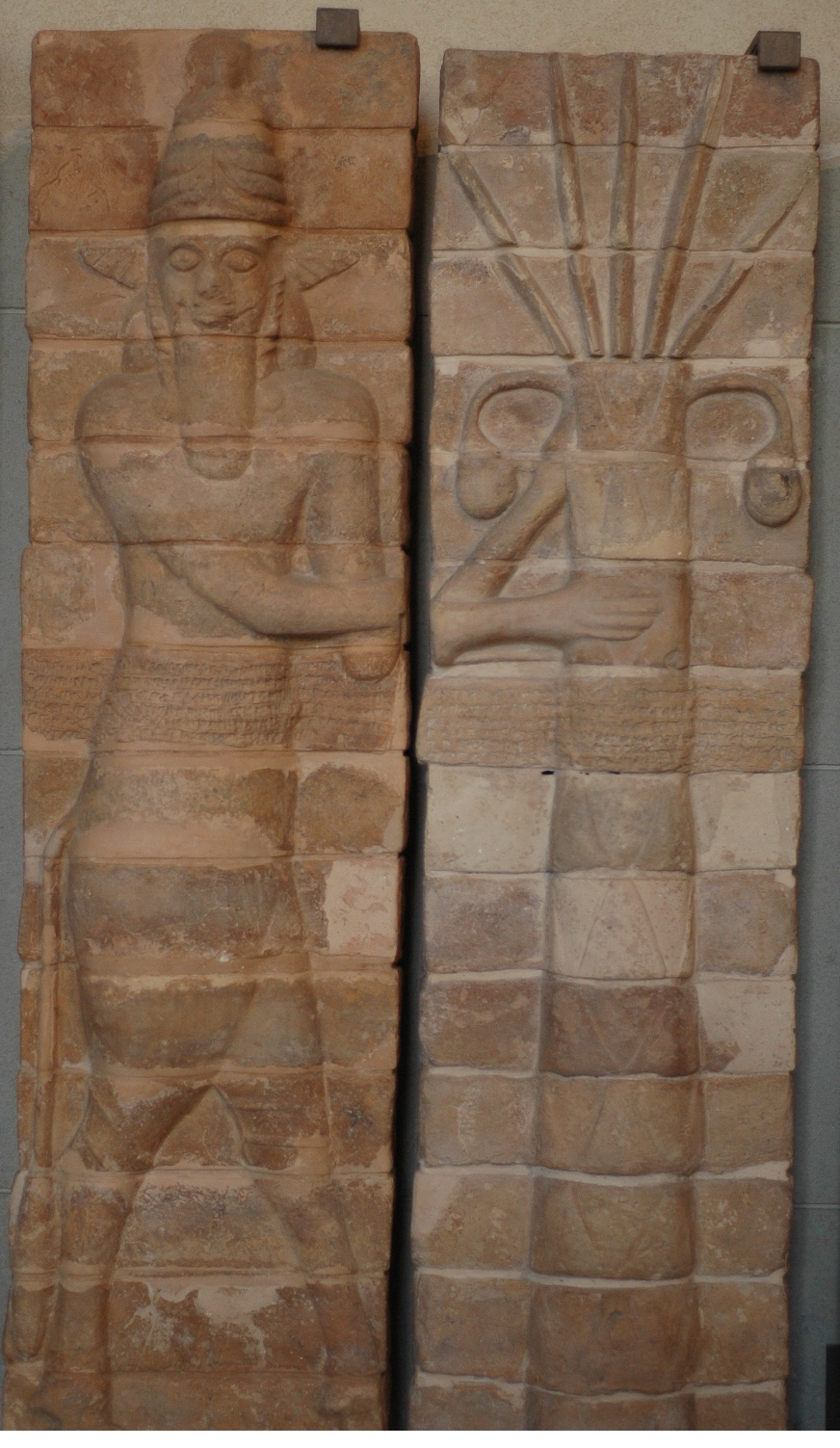
Bull-man protecting a palm tree, Decorative brick panel from the outer wall of a temple of Inshushinak in Susa (12th century BCE)

Inshushinak's iconography remains uncertain. It is assumed that the god handing the rod-and-ring symbol to a king on a stele of Untash-Napirisha from Susa is likely to be a depiction of him. While a connection between Inshushinak and snakes is not confirmed by textual sources, it has nonetheless been proposed that he was associated with these animals in Elamite art. Katrin De Graef argues that a god depicted alongside a snake and a spring depicted on Elamite seals and reliefs from the beginning of the second millennium BCE up to the reign of Untrash-Napirisha might be him, though identification with Napirisha has also been proposed. Jan Tavernier argues that snakes were his main symbol. Javier Álvarez-Mon instead suggests he might have been associated with a creature common in Elamite art which he describes as the "bird-headed griffin", though he stresses it is not impossible it was linked to other Elamite deities as well. Representations of these beings inscribed with a dedication to Inshushinak are known from Chogha Zanbil, but their native name is not preserved. Yasmina Wicks suggests that a fish-woman depicted on the aforementioned stele of Untash-Napirisha, who she compares to other similar hybrids attested in Elamite art, might have been an apotropaic being associated with him.

The figures on the Middle Elamite reliefs from the walls of the temple of Inshushinak are presumed to depict intercessory minor goddesses (^{d}LAMA) and bull-men (kusarikku).

== Associations with other deities ==
=== Lagamal and Ishmekarab ===
Lagamal and Ishmekarab, who both originated as Mesopotamian deities, were regarded as Inshushinak's assistants, and like him played a role in the journey of the dead to the afterlife in Elamite religion. During the judgment of the dead, Lagamal most likely acted as the prosecutor and Ishmekarab as a defender, as suggested based on the respective meanings of their names, "who has no mercy" and "who hears the prayer". Wouter Henkelman metaphorically describes them as advocatus diaboli and advocatus dei. They were also responsible for executing Inshushinak's judgments.

In the past it was commonly assumed that Ishmekarab was regarded as Inshushinak's spouse, though this proposal relies on the assumption the former was a female deity, which remains uncertain. An inheritance document indicates that it was believed that Inshushinak and Ishmekarab were responsible for establishing the customary view that the position of a brother by adoption was equal to that of a biological brother.

=== Napirisha and Kiririsha ===
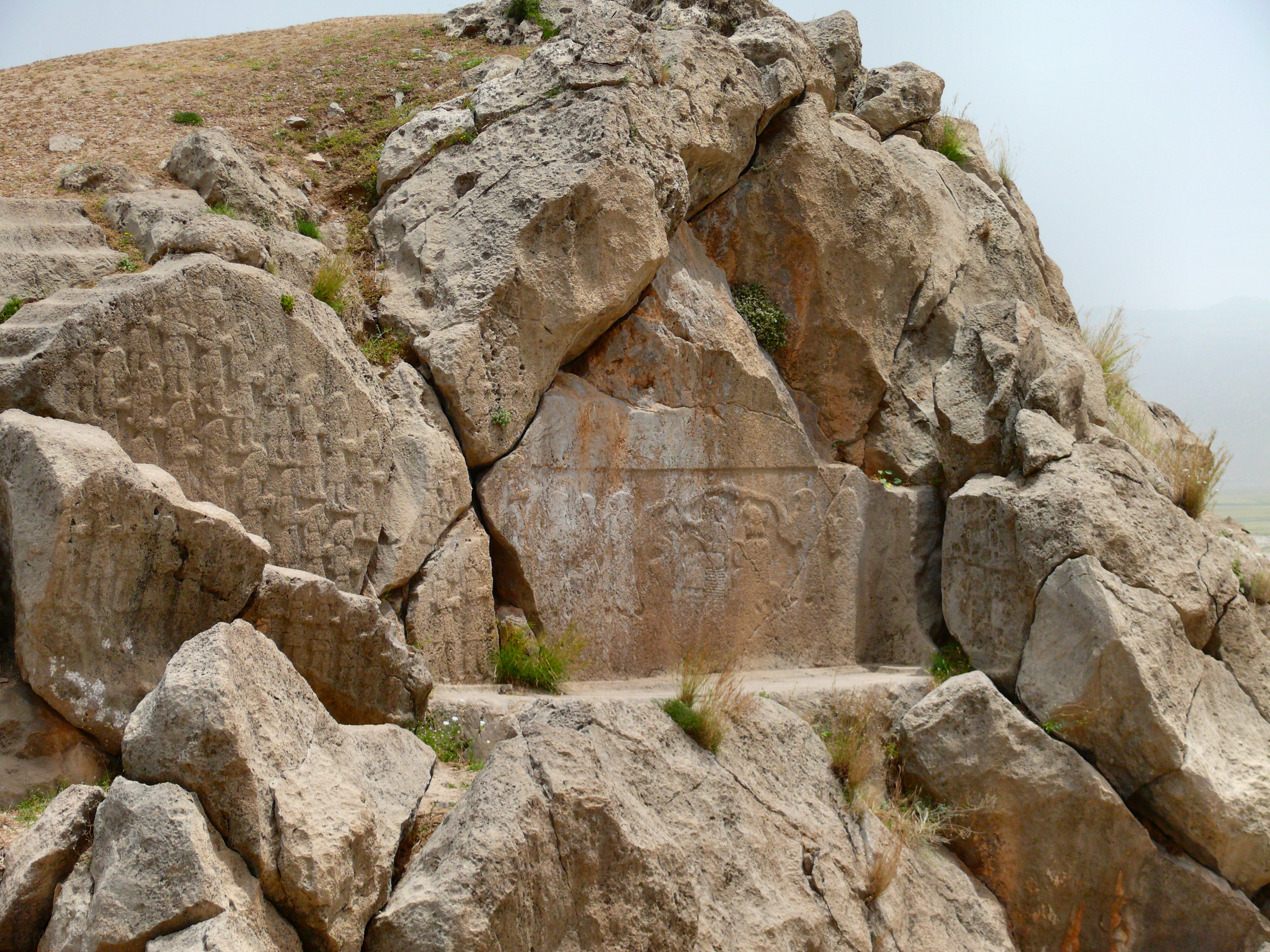
The Kurangun relief.

There is evidence that Inshushinak could form a triad with Napirisha and Kiririsha. It originally formed no earlier than in the first half of the nineteenth century BCE, with references only starting to appear commonly in texts from the Middle Elamite period. These three deities are invoked together in Untash-Napirisha's inscriptions from Chogha Zanbil and in texts attributed to Shilhak-Inshushinak. Milad Jahangirfar notes that since Inshushinak was the lead god of Susa and Napirisha held an analogous position in Anshan, rulers might have sometimes attempted to present them the same figure. For example, in a number of texts from Chogha Zanbil plural forms are not used when these two gods invoked at once where they would be necessary according to the grammar of the Elamite language. The Kurangun relief, which depicts a male deity variously interpreted as either of them by modern authors, might have been a product of this process. Jahangirfar concludes that most likely both of them nonetheless maintained separate identities, though Inshushinak likely acquired some traits from Napirisha.

In the past attempts have been made to present Kiririsha as the spouse of both Inshushinak and Napirisha, but this view is not considered plausible anymore. Primary sources commonly recognize her and Napirisha as a couple.

=== Ea and Inzak ===
It is possible that Inshushinak was associated, though not necessarily equated, with Mesopotamian Ea and Dilmunite Inzak in Elamite context. (Note: At the same time, in Mesopotamia the god regarded as the "Ea of Elam" was Napirisha.) An Akkadian text attributed to Temti-Agun might feature an example of both of the latter names as epithets being treated as epithets of Inshushinak. Javier Álvarez-Mon notes that the fact a single inscription states that Puzur-Inshushinak's father was named Šu-Ea rather than Šimbi-išuk-Inšušinak might be an indication that these two gods were syncretised.

== Worship ==
The earliest Elamite source mentioning Inshushinak is the treaty between Naram-Sin of Akkad and an Elamite ruler, possibly Khita of Awan. This identification is commonly cited in modern literature, though it ultimately remains uncertain, and it is not clear if the Elamite signatory, who is left nameless, hailed from Awan at all. While Inshushinak is only listed sixth among the gods invoked as its divine witnesses, after Pinikir, Humban, Amba, Zit and Nahhunte, he appears multiple times through the document, with four certain references and further five tentatively restored ones. Wouter Henkelman on this basis suggests that it is not impossible that the text reflects the cultural milieu of Susa, rather than Awan.

=== Susa ===
The last king of the Awan dynasty, Puzur-Inshushinak (reigned c. 2100 BCE), instated daily offerings to Inshushinak in Susa, which constitutes the oldest known reference to such a practice in sources from Elam. It is possible that the meat of the sheep offered to him at dawn and dusk was then consumed by religious personnel. The inscription commemorating this event invokes Inshushinak alongside Shamash, Enlil, Enki, Ishtar, Sin, Ninhursag, Narunte and "the totality of the gods" in a curse formula. (Note: Javier Álvarez-Mon notes that this selection of deities overlaps with these mentioned in a text proclaiming the deification of Naram-Sin of Akkad, with the only differences being the absence of Dagan, the tutelary god of Tuttul, and the inclusion of Inshushinak and Narunde, which according to him might indicate that Puzur-Inshushinak might have consciously emulated rulers of the Akkadian Empire.)

Most likely multiple temples dedicated to Inshushinak existed in Susa. Most likely they stood near the acropolis of Susa, as indicated by the discovery of numerous inscribed bricks and three houses of worship, one of which is known to have been dedicated to Inshushinak, during excavations. It is located in the southeast of this area. Textual sources indicate of the houses of worship dedicated to him bore the ceremonial Sumerian name Ekikununna ("house, princely pure place") or Ekikuanna ("house, pure place of heaven"). According to Françoise Grillot-Susini both of these names might be attempts at creating a Sumerian writing of the Elamite term kukunnum. According to Yasmina Wicks it might have referred to the temple on the top of a ziggurat, possibly with funerary connotations. It was rebuilt by Indattu-Inshushinak and Indattu II from the Shimashki dynasty. It is agreed that it should be considered separate from the "old temple" (É.GAR_{8} GIBIL) restored by the sukkalmah Kuk-Kirwaš, but it remains uncertain if the latter can also be distinguished from the temples mentioned in inscriptions of Puzur-Inshushinak and Shulgi of Ur. Another of the temples of Inshushinak was referred to as haštu, "tomb". Presumably this naming choice reflected the worship of Inshushinak's underworld aspect. It has been argued that the É.DÙ.A (reading uncertain), a structure mentioned in an inscription on a stela of Tepti-ahar according to which its six guards were supposed to provide specific commodities during "the festivals of abu, the four days of tašritu, (Note: Both abu and tašritu were months during which funerary offerings were made in Mesopotamia.) the feast of the deity Kirwašir, and the day of the new moon" might have been a temple or another "edifice with a funerary function" dedicated to Inshushinak, though the term has also been alternatively interpreted as referring to a tomb or as a vague designation for a construction project. The structure was restored by Inshushinak-shar-Ilani in the Middle Elamite period.

Inshushinak could also be venerated in sanctuaries known as siyan husame, "temple in the grove", which as indicated by their name were located within sacred groves, well attested in Elamite sources. However, they are not attested in sources from Susa predating the Middle Elamite period. They might have played a role in a funerary cult. Wouter Henkelman states that this function is sometimes held to be true for the siyan husame in general, as multiple deities for whom such structures are attested, including Inshushinak, Ishmekarab, Lagamal, Kiririsha and possibly Napirisha, were associated with the underworld; however, others, like Manzat, Simut and Suhsipa, lacked such a role. (Note: Jan Tavernier questions the classification of Ishmekarab as a deity related to the underworld in this context too.) Furthermore, the proposed identification between siyan husame and haštu, in the past used to support this proposal, is no longer accepted, as they are listed as two separate types of structures in the text EKI 48.

A type of monumental gates, hiel, could be dedicated to Inshushinak too, and might have represented the entrance to the underworld. However, this conclusion is not certain, as they could be dedicated to various deities, not all of whom have been conclusively proven to be connected to beliefs pertaining to death and the afterlife.

=== Other cities ===
A stele of Shilhak-Inshushinak discovered in the temple of Inshushinak located at the acropole of Susa enumerates twenty siyan husame restored by this king, most of which were dedicated to Inshushinak, including these located in Tēttu, Ša Attata-mitik, Ekallat, Bīt Turni (restoration partially uncertain), Ša Attata-ekal-likrup, Marrut, Ša Hantallak and possibly Perraperra. Most of these toponyms are otherwise unattested, and might have been located near the city. However, Wouter Henkelman argues that sanctuaries of Inshushinak might have not been located only in the proximity of Susa, with siyan husame dedicated to him possibly serving as "markers of royal power" in other parts of Elam.

A ziggurat dedicated to Inshushinak existed in Chogha Zanbil (Al-Untash-Napirisha), a city originally established by Untash-Napirisha. In inscriptions from this site he is identified as the "lord of the dead in the siyan kuk", a term referring to the local temple complex. A sanctuary dedicated jointly to him and Napirisha was located on top of it. He also had a sanctuary in this location referred to with the term likrin, a hapax legomenon whose translation remains uncertain.

Attestations of temples of Inshushinak are largely limited to texts from Susa and Chogha Zanbil. However, an inscription of Untash-Napirisha from Tappeh Deylam preserved in six copies also mentions the construction of a sanctuary dedicated to him, Mašti and Tepti. Near the end of the Middle Elamite period, around 1125 BCE, a temple dedicated jointly to him, Napirisha, Kiririsha and Simut was built in Anshan by king Hutelutush-Inshushinak. It was designated by the otherwise unattested term, siyan tarin, "temple of the alliance", though it is not known if this name refers to a secular alliance, to an alliance between worshipers and deities, or to one between the four deities worshiped together in it. However, it is assumed that Inshushinak was not commonly venerated in Anshan, and he is otherwise only attested there in a small number of theophoric names.

=== Late attestations ===
Inshushinak continued to be worshiped in Neo-Elamite times. In one of the oldest texts possible to date to this period, Shutruk-Nahhunte III (716–699 BCE) states that he reinstalled three statues representing deceased kings in the kukkunum of Inshushinak. These included his father Huban-mena as well as two earlier rulers from the Shutrukid dynasty, Hutelutush-Inshushinak and Šilhina-hamru-Lagamar. The goal of this act might have been to link his own rule with an earlier Elamite dynasty. The same ruler also apparently relocated a kukunnum of Inshushinak from Susa to Karintaš, possibly to be identified with Kerend-e Gharb on the road from Baghdad and Kermanshah, to protect it. A new temple dedicated to him was built in Susa by Hallutash-Inshushinak. A late administrative archive from Susa mentions the otherwise unattested phenomenon of local manifestations of Inshushinak, linked to Amperi, Halumirashi and Haran.

Heidemarie Koch argued that Inshushinak ceased to be worshiped after the emergence of the Achaemenid state, but Wouter Henkelman points out in a more recent publication that while there is no source from Achaemenid Susa which would make it possible to evaluate whether he remained the main god of this city, based on parallels with the cults of Napirisha and Humban it is likely that he continued to be worshiped in the lowlands, and his cult might have enjoyed royal patronage. Yasmina Wicks notes that it is possible that Tepti-Huban-Inšušinak II, who might have reigned in the Achaemenid period as a vassal of Cyrus II, mentions Inshushinak (as well as Pinikir) in his inscriptions. Atta-hamiti-Inšušinak II, the last attested Neo-Elamite ruler, (Note: Likely identical with the rebel Aθamaita mentioned in the Behistun Inscription.) also invoked Inshushinak in an inscription meant to highlight his dedication to the god of Susa and to the city's population, though he most likely reigned from elsewhere, possibly from a mountains part of modern Khuzestan.

== Mesopotamian reception ==
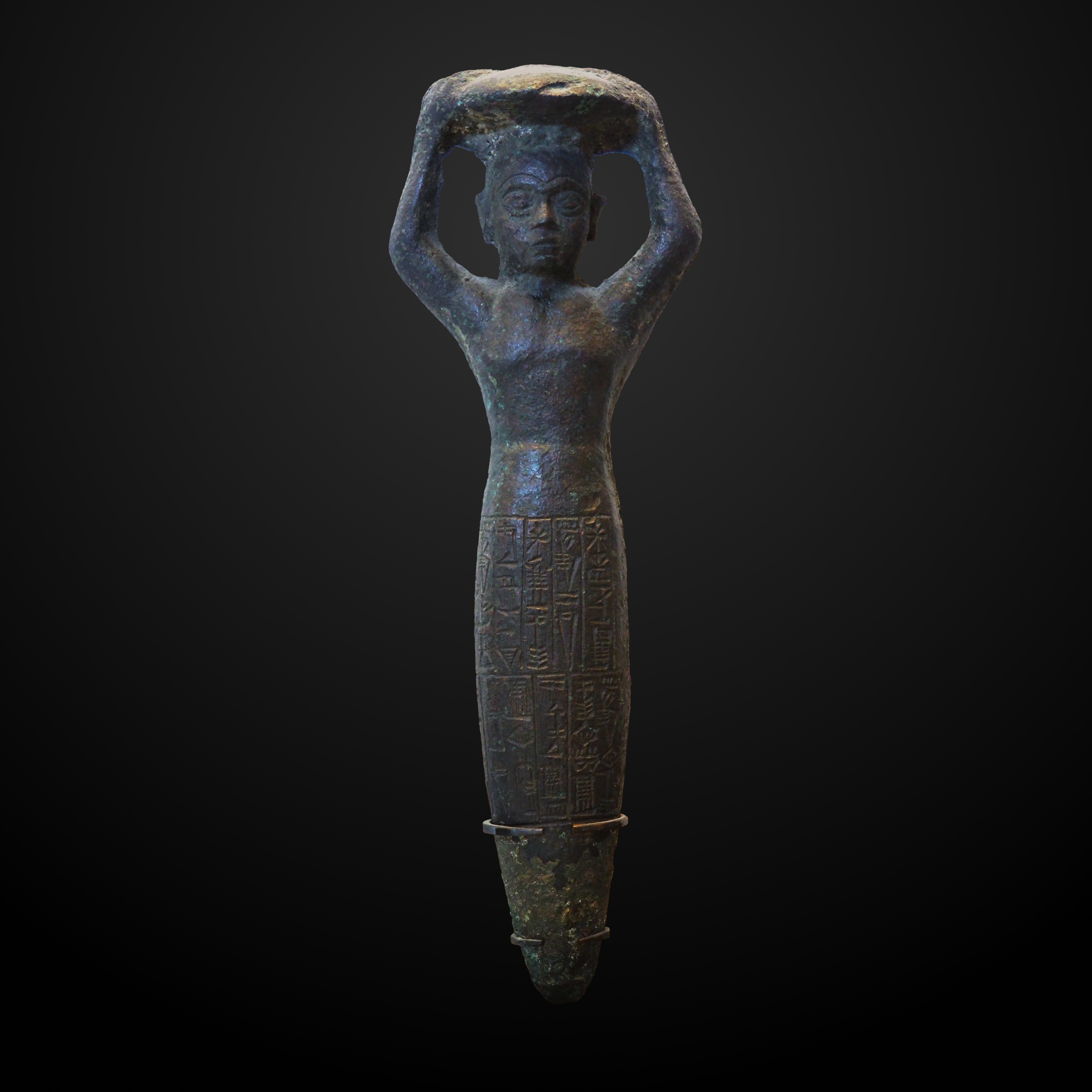
Foundation nail dedicated by Shulgi to Inshushinak, found in Susa. Louvre Museum

The oldest known Mesopotamian reference to Inshushinak has been identified in an Early Dynastic god list from Abu Salabikh. It has been dated to 2500 BCE, and predates the treaty of Naram-Sin, which makes it the first known reference to this god. In the Ur III period, king Shulgi of Ur rebuilt a temple dedicated to him located in Susa which according to his inscriptions bore the name A'arkeš. Daniel Potts concludes that its name has no clear etymology and points out it is not attested in any other sources.

Inshushinak is attested in the god list An = Anum (tablet V, line 286). He appears in it as a member of a group of deities associated with the underworld and with snakes alongside Ereshkigal, Ninazu, Ningishzida, Tishpak, Ishtaran and their courtiers, such as Irnina or Nirah. However, no courtiers or family members are attributed to him. Marten Stol states that this text designates him as one of the sons of Tishpak alongside Nanshak, Pappasānu, Me-SUḪUR and Ishtaran. According to Manuel Ceccarelli, this connection most likely should be considered as a secondary Mesopotamian development, as it is unlikely the tutelary god of Susa would be recognized as the son of the god of Eshnunna in his own city. Inshushinak is also among the deities whose temples appear in the so-called Canonical Temple List, presumably compiled in the Kassite period and modeled after An = Anum. However, neither its full name nor location are preserved. Andrew R. George suggests that Inshushinak's placement in it might reflect an association between him and Ninurta known from late Mesopotamian sources. A direct equation between them is also attested. The god list An = Anum ša amēli explains Inshushinak as "Ninurta of silence" (Ninurta ša qūlti), though the implications of this passage remain poorly understood. An incantation which mentions Inshushinak, Saĝkud and Mes-sanga-Unug in sequence according to George might treat all three as forms of Ninurta. In the Epic of Anzû, Inshushinak ("Shushinak") is one of the names of Ninurta, said to designate him in Susa. Walther Hinz instead argued that in Mesopotamia Inshushinak was equated with Adad, but there is no evidence in any primary sources that would support this view, and Mesopotamian god lists instead recognize three otherwise unknown deities as his Elamite counterparts, Kunzibami, Šihhaš and Šennukušu.

In the incantation series Šurpu, Inshushinak appears in a sequence of Elamite deities invoked from Susa alongside Lahuratil, Humban and Napirisha. They are assigned a positive role as figures capable of releasing a patient from trouble.

Inshushinak is mentioned in the account of Ashurbanipal's campaign against Elam (646 BCE). In this context he is described as a "mysterious god who dwells in seclusion, (the god) whose divine features nobody was allowed to see", which according to Jan Tavernier offers a parallel to his Elamite epithets highlighting his "secret" or "hidden" nature. Reettakaisa Sofia Salo argues that the author of this text must have possessed some knowledge of the local traditions pertaining to him.

A man bearing the name Šibqat-Šušinak is mentioned in a single document from Seleucid Uruk. There is however no evidence for large-scale cult of Inshushinak in this location. Not much is also known about Šibqat-Šušinak beyond the fact that his daughter, who bore the Greek name Phanaia, was a slave.

== Susa Funerary Texts ==
Inshushinak appears in the so-called Susa Funerary Texts. They were written in Akkadian typical for the late Old Babylonian period, c. 1600-1500 BCE, though a slightly more recent date, c. 1400 BCE, is also not impossible. Inshushinak is the only strictly Elamite deity mentioned in them, and Nathan Wasserman argues that their language, form and content reflect the well attested phenomenon of integration of scribes from Susa into the literary culture of Mesopotamia. He states Inshushinak's presence in Akkadian literature from Susa can be compared to analogous cases of other locally popular gods, like Dagan or Itūr-Mēr in texts from Mari, Marduk in Babylon or Ashur in Assur.

The Susa Funerary Texts are considered unique because they constitute the only known examples of Akkadian compositions dealing with the underworld to be found in a grave in situ. Jan Tavernier notes that they might represent a guide for the dead. However, it is possible they do not form a single coherent composition, and they might not even all belong to the same genre. It is not impossible that they constitute a collection of excerpts from longer texts. Wasserman argues that it cannot be established with certainty to what degree they actually present the fate of the dead in the underworld, and states referring to them as "funerary" might be a misnomer, even though they do allude to the land of the dead. He proposes interpreting them as magical texts comparable to later Greco-Roman curse tablets instead. However, Yasmina Wicks in an earlier publication notes that questioning the funerary context of these texts has historically been a minority position. It is nonetheless recognized that even if this characterization is accepted, the Susa Funerary Texts would constitute the only example of funerary texts written in Akkadian, "a unit which is unique in the Mesopotamian literature."

According to Jan Tavernier's interpretation, the Susa Funerary Texts describe the deceased presenting themselves to the Anunnaki, in this context to be understood as a designation for the gods of the underworld, (Note: The term is used similarly in Inanna's Descent, where the deities designated by it are responsible for the decision to make the eponymous goddess remain in the underworld.) and subsequently being escorted by Lagamal and Ishmekarab to receive Inshushinak's judgment. Wasserman notes it is possible the encounter with Inshushinak is described as taking place in a dream, which would offer a close parallel to a passage in the Underworld Vision of an Assyrian Prince involving the appearance of Ereshkigal in a similar context. Jan Tavernier states that an additional figure involved in the judgment might be a "weigher". However, this translation has not been universally accepted, and the concept of weighing of souls is not attested in any other cuneiform text. Tavernier, while he agrees that the Susa Funerary Texts should be placed within the context of Mesopotamian literature and afterlife beliefs, suggests it could constitute a strictly Elamite concept incorporated into them, despite not being attested in any other Elamite sources either. He proposes comparisons with later Iranian beliefs as supplementary evidence, specifically arguing that the group consisting of Inshushinak, Ishmekarab and Lagamal can be compared to the Zoroastrian grouping of the yazatas Mithra, Sraosha and Rashnu. It is attested chiefly in Pahlavi texts, and does not appear in earlier Avesta. Similar comparisons have been made by other authors as well. However, this proposal did not find universal support. Tavernier admits that Inshushinak's and Mitra's names are dissimilar and Rashnu's ("justice") and Lagamal's ("who has no mercy") outright contradict each other, though he argues a parallel can be seen between Sraosha and Ishmekarab due to both of them bearing names which go back to terms meaning "hearing, hearkening". However, it is not impossible that this semantic parallel is accidental, as words referring to hearing are not an uncommon component of theonyms, as evidenced for example by the goddess Tashmetum, unrelated to either of these figures. Tavernier himself admits that the fact Sraosha only became a popular figure in the Parthian period, roughly in the first century BCE, which might indicate a time gap too significant to permit presenting him as analogous to Ishmekarab. He ultimately concludes the similarities might be accidental. Wasserman evaluated his treatment of the Susa Funerary Texts as a whole critically, and argues that it detaches them from their historical context, with Zoroastrian sources separated from them by two millennia treated as closer to them than contemporary Akkadian literature.
