= Hutelutush-Inshushinak =

- King of Anshan and Susa
- Elam during the Shutrukid Dynasty, of which Hutelutush-Inshushinak belonged to.

King of Elam
- Reign: c. 1120–1100 BC
- Predecessor: Shilhak-Inshushinak
- Successor: Uncertain, perhaps Shilhina-hamru-Lagamar
- Father: Shilhak-Inshushinak
- Mother: Nahhunte-utu

Hutelutush-Inshushinak, son of Shilhak-Inshushinak I, was an Elamite king belonging to the Shutrukid dynasty, ruling c. 1120–1100 BC. During the reign of Hutelutush-Inshushinak, Elam was heavily raided by king Nabu-kudurri-usur I of Babylon's Second Dynasty of Isin.

== Background ==
=== Political situation at accession ===
When Hutelutush-Inshushinak came to the throne around the year 1120 BC, a number of political changes had occurred that would affect the reign of Hutelutush-Inshushinak.

==== Bronze Age Collapse ====
Around 1200 BC, a chain of events unfolded which led to the Bronze Age Collapse, which saw the decline of many societies and civilizations across the whole Near East. However, while other civilizations were declining, the Elamites took advantage of the decline of their neighbors and prospered.

==== Babylonia ====
In Babylon, following the withdrawal of the Elamites, a man named Marduk-kabit-ahheshu took the throne, beginning a native Babylonian dynasty that would last 131 years. His relative, Nabu-kudurri-usur I (more commonly known as Nebuchadnezzar I) ascended the Babylonian throne in 1121 BC.

==== The Assyrians ====
Assyria had been in decline since the reign of Ashur-nadin-apli, who wrested control of the country in 1207 BC from his father, Tukulti-Ninurta I. When Hutelutush-Inshushinak became the king in Elam, Ashur-resh-ishi I was the Assyrian king, coming to power in the year 1132 BC.

=== The Shutrukids ===
The predecessors of Hutelutush-Inshushinak, kings Shutruk-Nahhunte, Kutir-Nahhunte II, and Shilhak-Inshushinak, ruled during an apex of Elamite power towards the end of the Middle Elamite Period. Shutruk-Nahhunte invaded Babylonia, driving out the Kassites, who had ruled as kings of Babylon for four centuries. When he entered the city of Babylon, Shutruk-Nahhunte took as plunder many ancient statues, most famously including the victory stele of the Akkadian king Naram-Sin, as well as the Statue of Marduk. Shutruk-Nahhunte's sons, Kutir-Nahhunte and Shilhak-Inshushinak controlled a strong realm that encompassed many cities. Shilhak-Inshushinak controlled territory as far north as the Lower Zab river, the Assyrian border.

== Reign ==
Hutelutush-Inshushinak's year of accession to the throne is uncertain, it took place sometime around 1120 BC. As king of Elam, he had access to many natural resources which were traded with Mesopotamia, as many administrative documents suggest. Soon, however, it appears that Hutelutush-Inshushinak ran into trouble with the Babylonian king, Nebuchadnezzar I.

=== Nebuchadnezzar's incursion ===
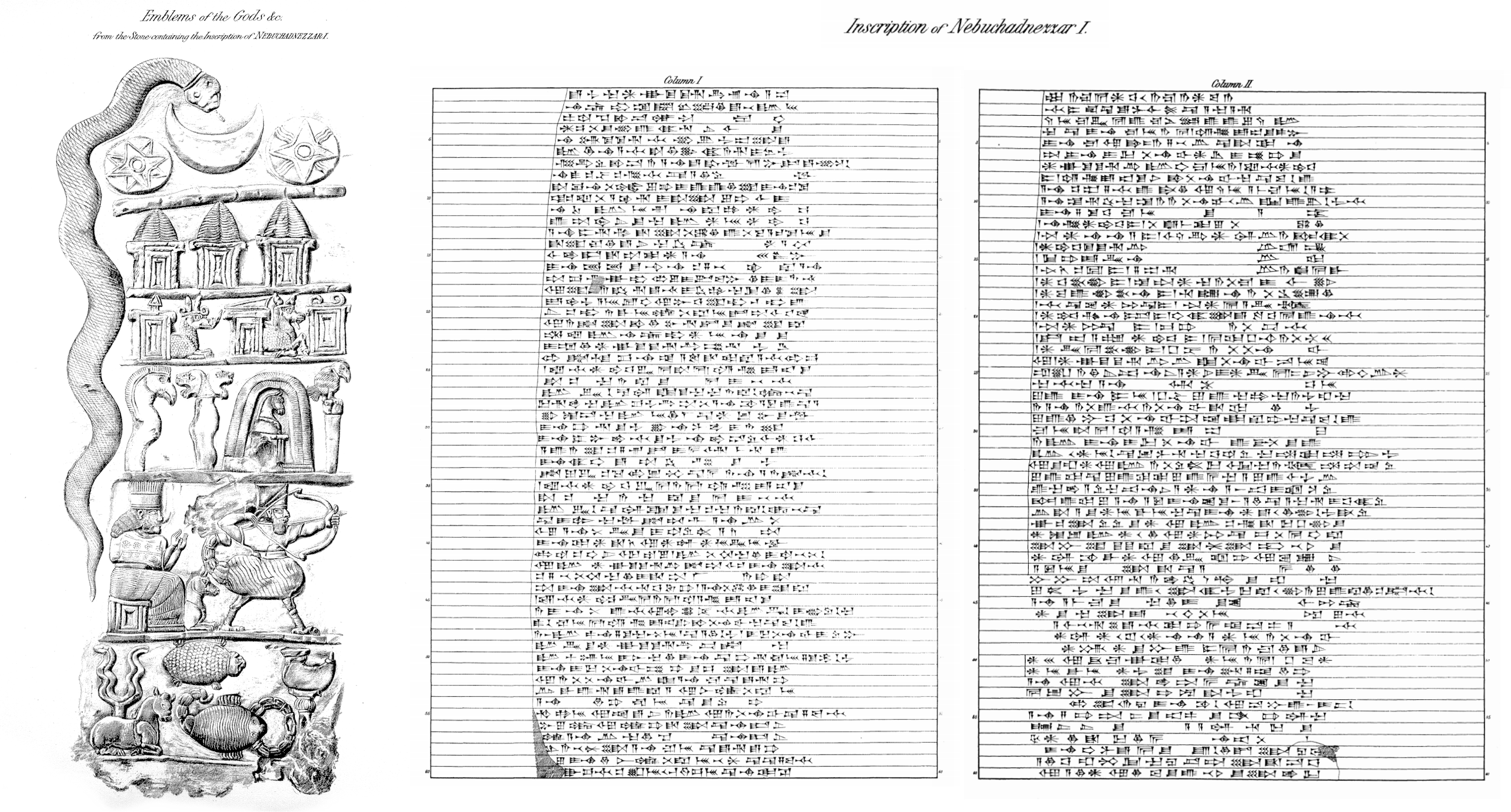
The kudurru of Šitti-Marduk, commemorating Nebuchadnezzar's victory over Elam.

Nebuchadnezzar invaded Elam for the first time around 1115 BC, but, according to later traditions, this expedition ended in failure when his soldiers were stricken by plague. He invaded a second time, meeting Hutelutush-Inshushinak and his troops at the Ulai river. According to a kudurru, a Babylonian boundary stone, in the thick of battle, a dust storm appeared that obscured the view of the Babylonian soldiers. After the dust settled, Hutelutush-Inshushinak was nowhere to be found. Nebuchadnezzar proceeded to plunder Susa, retrieving the Statue of Marduk and returned it to Babylon.

=== Decline of Elam ===
Until recently, scholarship suggested that Hutelutush-Inshushinak disappeared after the attack, however now it is believed that he simply moved his seat of residence to Anshan. Following this, the Elamite kingdom started to decline, and after the death of Hutelutush-Inshushinak, only two more Middle Elamite kings are recorded: Shilhina-hamru-Lagamar and Humban-numena II. After these kings, no king is attested until Humban-tahrah of the First Neo-Elamite Dynasty 350 years later.

| Preceded by Shilhak-Inshushinak | King of Elam c. 1120–1100 BC | Succeeded by Shilhina-hamru-Lagamar |
