= Shilhak-Inshushinak =

King of Elam and a king of the Shutrukid Dynasty

Shilhak-Inshushinak I
- King of Anshan and Susa
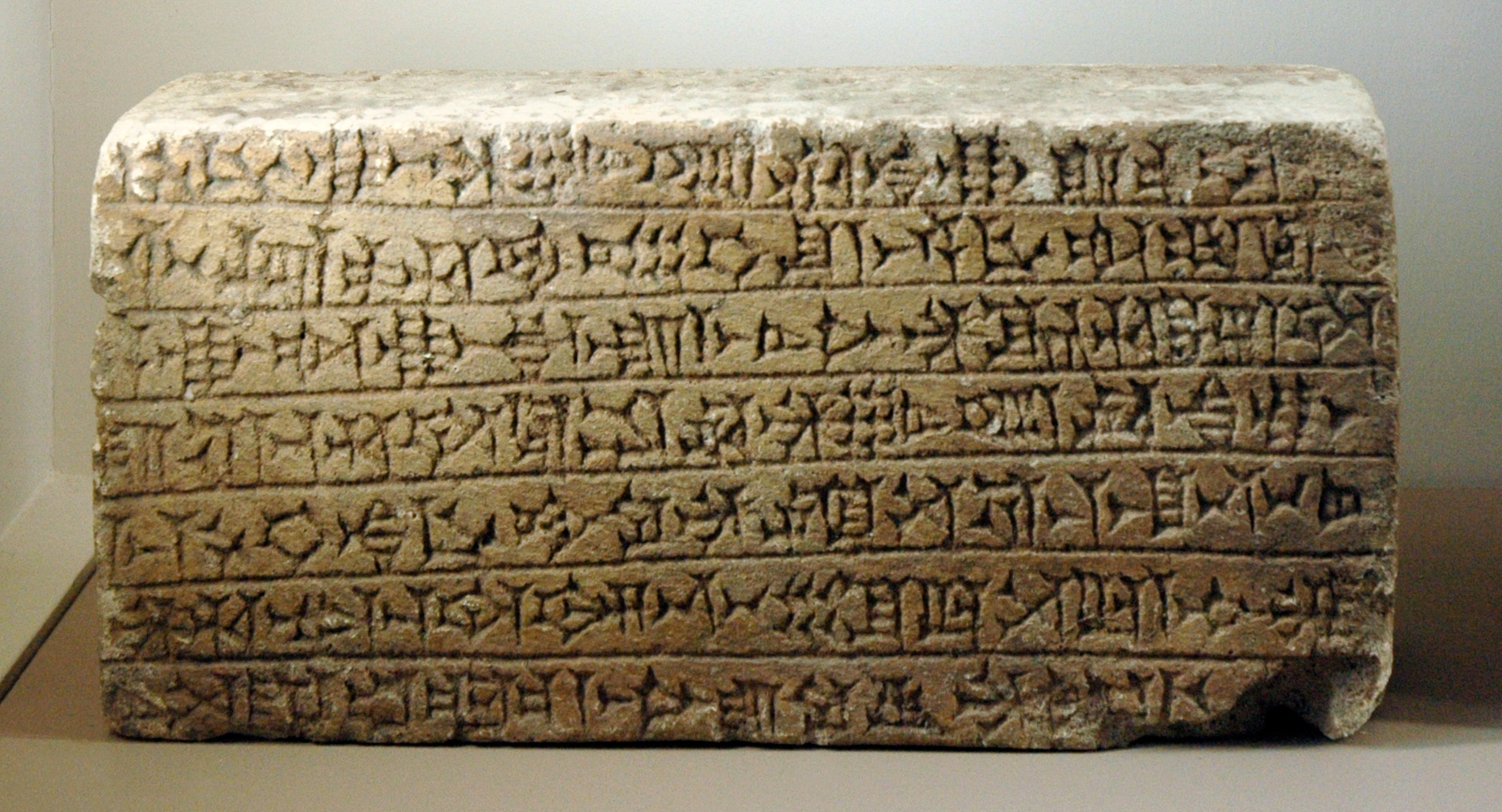
- Brick of Shilhak-Inshushinak with Elamite inscription, regarding the decoration of Susa with enamelled bricks, v. -1140, musée du Louvre

King of Elam
- Reign: c. 1150 – c. 1120 BC
- Predecessor: Kutir-Nahhunte II
- Successor: Hutelutush-Inshushinak
- Spouse: Nahhunte-utu
- Dynasty: Shutrukid dynasty
- Father: Shutruk-Nakhunte

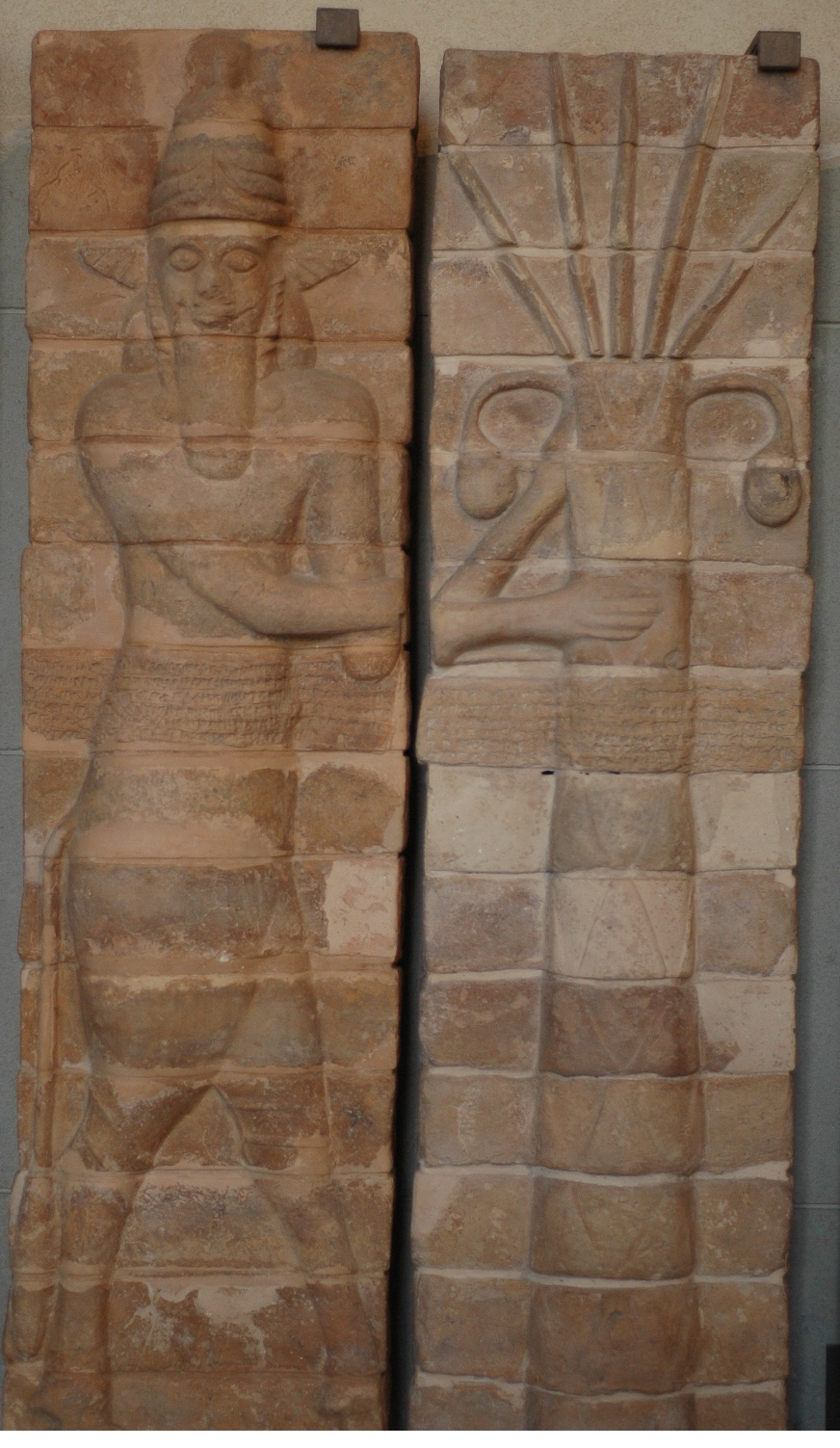
Bull-man protecting a palmtree, middle 12th century BC. Found at the Tell of the Apadana in Susa. The inscription running along the central band record that Shilhak-Inshushinak made a statue of brick for the exterior chapel of Inshushinak.

Shilhak-Inshushinak I (Elamite: Šilḫak-Inšušinak, meaning "Powered by Inshushinak") was king of Elam from about 1150 to 1120 BC and a member of the Shutrukid ruling dynasty. He was the son of Shutruk-Nahhunte I.

== Background ==
In the decades before the rule of Shilhak-Inshushinak, the Elamite state grew from a Babylonian vassal into a prosperous and expanding empire. His father, Shutruk-Nahhunte invaded Babylon and his brother Kutir-Nahhunte II held strong control on the conquered lands.

== Reign ==
When he replaced his older brother, Kutir-Nahhunte II, he became the last great king of Elam. He married the widow of his brother, Queen Nahhunte-utu and had eight children.

He waged wars with Babylonia, much like his immediate predecessors, in addition to conquering large parts of northern and eastern Mesopotamia.

He ruled for thirty years and many inscriptions have remained of him.

Preceded by Kutir-Nahhunte II	King of Elam c.1150–1120 BC	Succeeded by Hutelutush-Inshushinak
