= Nahhunte-utu =

Nahhunte-utu was an Elamite queen and the wife of two of the greatest kings of Elam from the Shutrukid dynasty. She had a son named Hutelutush-inshushinak with Kutir-Nahhunte and eight children with her second husband, Shilhak-Inshushinak.
