= Shutrukid dynasty =

Dynasty in ancient Elam

- Map of the territory of Elam.
- Parent family: Igihalkid dynasty
- Country: Elam
- Current region: Western Iran
- Origin: Asia
- Founded: c. 1200 BC
- Founder: Shutruk-Nakhunte I
- Final ruler: Shutur-Nahhunte I
- Historic seat: Susa
- Connected families: Humban-Tahrid dynasty
- Traditions: Elamite religion
- Dissolution: c. 970 BC
- Deposition: c. 1115 BC
- Cadet branches: Elamite dynasty

The Shutrukid dynasty (c. 1200 – c. 1100 BC) was a dynasty of the Elamite empire, in modern Iran. Under the Shutrukids, Elam reached a height in power.

== History ==
Shutruk-Nakhkhunte was the founder of this dynasty. He took as wife a Babylonian princess, the eldest daughter of Melishihu of Babylon. Shutruk-Nakhkhunte and his three sons, Kutir-Nakhkhunte II, Shilhak-In-Shushinak, and Khutelutush-In-Shushinak were capable of frequent military campaigns into Kassite Babylonia (which was also being ravaged by the empire of Assyria during this period), and at the same time were exhibiting vigorous construction activity—building and restoring luxurious temples in Susa and across their Empire. Shutruk-Nakhkhunte raided Babylonia, carrying home to Susa trophies like the statues of Marduk and Manishtushu, the Manishtushu Obelisk, the Stele of Hammurabi and the stele of Naram-Sin. With these trophies, he attempted to give a new aura to Elam, as the conqueror of Babylonia. Shutruk-Nakhunte added his own inscription on the stele of Naram-Sin:

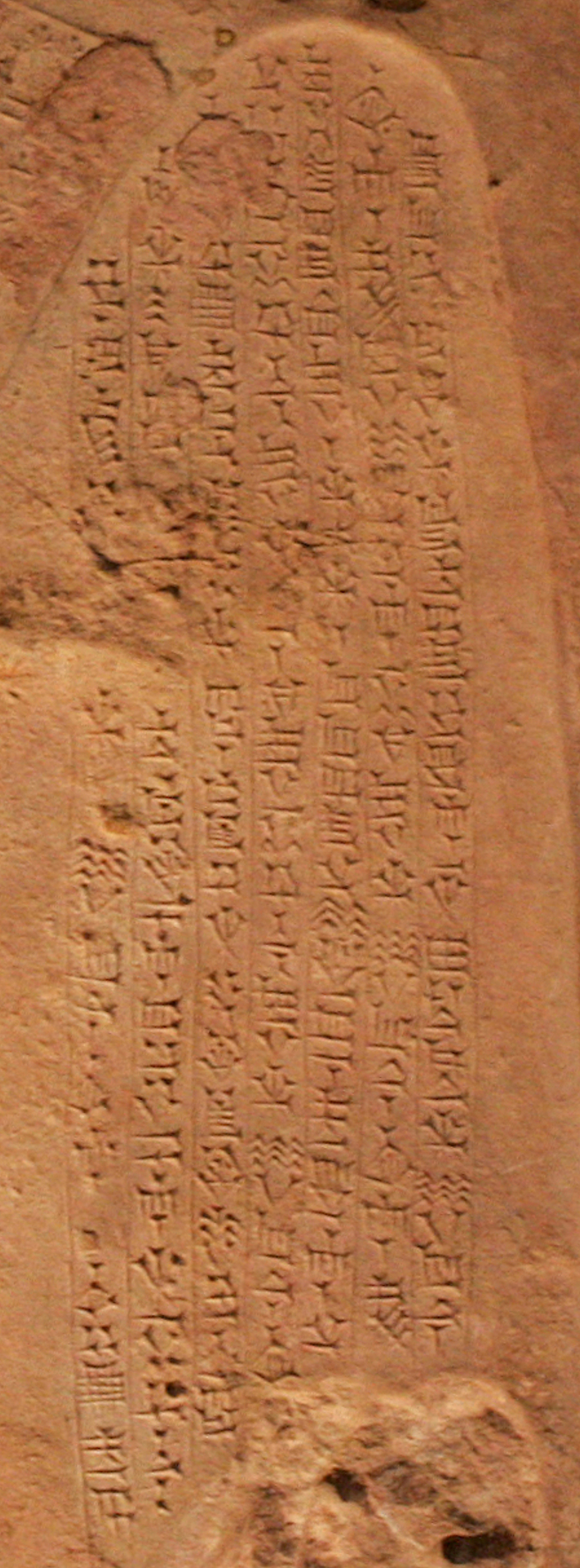
Inscription of Shutruk-Nahhunte in Elamite on the Victory Stele of Naram-Sin.

"I am Shutruk-Nahhunte, son of Hallutush-Inshushinak, beloved servant of the god Inshushinak, king of Anshan and Susa, who has enlarged the kingdom, who takes care of the lands of Elam, the lord of the land of Elam. When the god Inshushinak gave me the order, I defeated Sippar. I took the stele of Naram-Sin and carried it off, bringing it to the land of Elam. For Inshushinak, my god, I set it as an offering."

— Elamite inscription of Shutruk-Nahhunte on the victory stele of Naram-Sin.

In 1158 BC, after much of Babylonia had been annexed by Ashur-Dan I of Assyria and Shutruk-Nakhkhunte, the Elamites defeated permanently the Kassites, a dynasty which had ruled Mesopotamia for four centuries. They killed the Kassite king of Babylon, Zababa-shuma-iddin, and replaced him with Shutruk-Nakhkhunte's eldest son, Kutir-Nakhkhunte, who held it no more than three years before being ejected by the native Akkadian speaking Babylonians. The Elamites then briefly came into conflict with Assyria, managing to take the Assyrian city of Arrapḫa (modern Kirkuk) before being ultimately defeated and having a treaty forced upon them by Ashur-Dan I.

Kutir-Nakhkhunte's son Khutelutush-In-Shushinak was defeated by Nebuchadnezzar I of Babylon, who sacked Susa and returned the statue of Marduk, but who was then himself defeated by the Assyrian king Ashur-resh-ishi I. He fled to Anshan, but later returned to Susa, and his brother Shilhana-Hamru-Lagamar may have succeeded him as last king of the Shutrukid dynasty. Following Khutelutush-In-Shushinak, the power of the Elamite empire began to wane, for after the death of this ruler, Elam disappears into obscurity for more than three centuries.

== List of rulers ==
The following list should not be considered complete:

#	Depiction	Name	Succession	Title	Approx. dates	Notes
Middle Elamite II period (c. 1400 – c. 1200 BC)
Shutrukid dynasty (c. 1200 – c. 970 BC)
1st		Hallutush-Inshushinak	Unclear succession	King of Anshan and Susa	Uncertain, fl. c. 1217 – c. 1184 BC	
2nd		Shutruk-Nakhunte I	Eponymous founder of the Shutrukid dynasty Son of Hallutush-Inshushinak Son-in-law of Melishihu of Babylon	King of Anshan and Susa Sovereign of the land of Elam Lord of the land of Elam	Uncertain, r. c. 1184 – c. 1155 BC	temp. of: Meli-Shipak II; Marduk-apla-iddina I; Zababa-shuma-iddin
3rd		Kutir-Nahhunte II	Son of Shutruk-Nahhunte I	King of Anshan and Susa King of Elam King of Babylon	Uncertain, r. c. 1155 – c. 1150 BC	temp. of: Enlil-nadin-ahi
4th		Shilhak-Inshushinak I	Son of Shutruk-Nahhunte I	King of Anshan and Susa King of Elam	Uncertain, r. c. 1150 – c. 1120 BC (30 years)	temp. of: Marduk-kabit-ahheshu; Itti-Marduk-balatu
5th		Hutelutush-Inshushinak	Son of Kutir-Nahhunte II	King of Anshan and Susa King of Elam King of Elam and Susiana	Uncertain, r. c. 1120 – c. 1100 BC	temp. of: Nebuchadnezzar I
Neo-Elamite I period (c. 1100 – c. 770 BC)
6th		Shilhina-Hamru-Lakamar	Son of Shilhak-Inshushinak I	King of Anshan and Susa King of Elam	Uncertain, fl. c. 1115 – c. 980 BC	
Elamite dynasty of Babylonia (c. 980 – c. 975 BC)
7th		Mar-biti-apla-usur	Unclear succession	King of Babylon Son of Elam	Uncertain, r. c. 980 – c. 975 BC (6 years)	temp. of: Ashur-resh-ishi II
Elamite Dark Ages (c. 975 – c. 770 BC)
8th		Akshir-Shimut	Unclear succession	King of Anshan and Susa	Uncertain, fl. c. 1110 – c. 975 BC	
9th		Akshir-Nahhunte	Unclear succession	King of Anshan and Susa	Uncertain, fl. c. 1100 – c. 970 BC	
10th		Kara-Indash	Unclear succession	King of Elam	Uncertain, fl. c. 1070 – c. 830 BC	
Neo-Elamite II period (c. 770 – c. 688 BC)
Humban-Tahrid dynasty (c. 830 – c. 688 BC)
11th		Unknown	Unclear succession	King of Anshan and Susa	Uncertain, fl. c. 821 BC	temp. of: Shamshi-Adad V
12th		Humban-Numena II	Unclear succession	King of Elam	Uncertain, fl. c. 1100 – c. 821 BC	
13th		Shutruk-Nahhunte II	Son of Humban-Numena II	King of Elam	Uncertain, fl. c. 1070 – c. 770 BC	
14th		Shutur-Nahhunte I	Son of Humban-Numena II	King of Anshan and Susa	Uncertain, fl. c. 1050 – c. 760 BC	

== Gallery ==
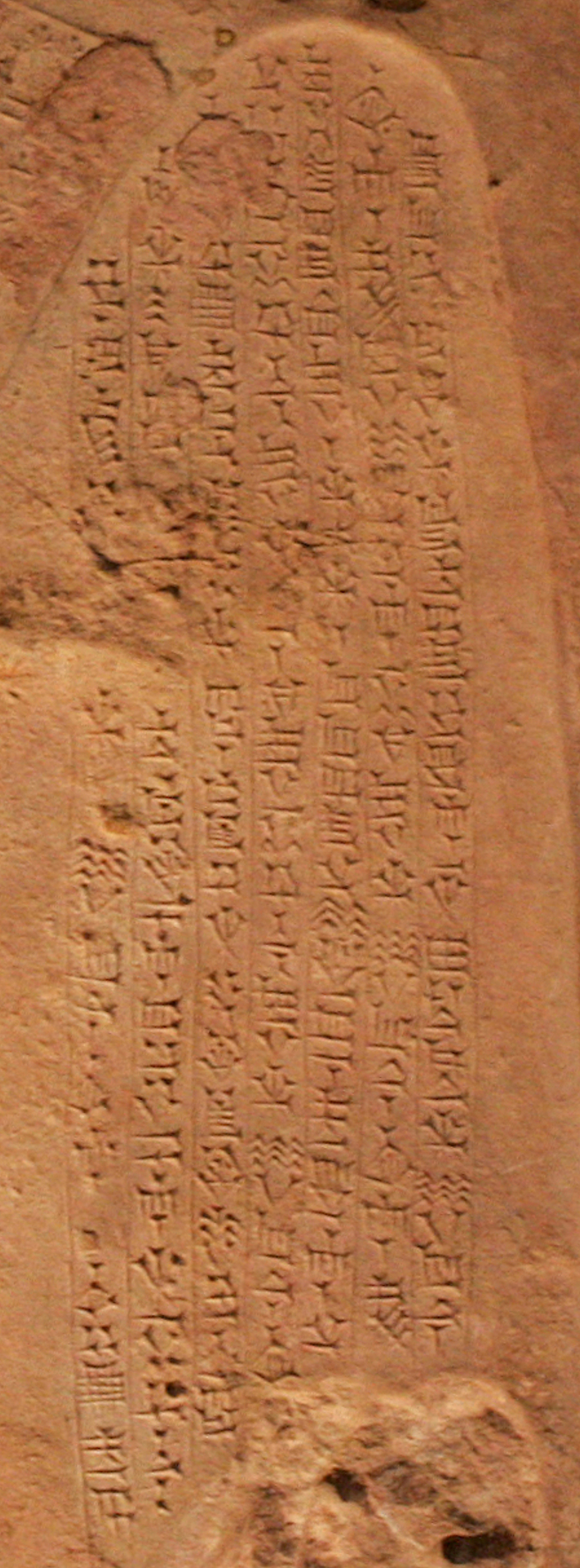

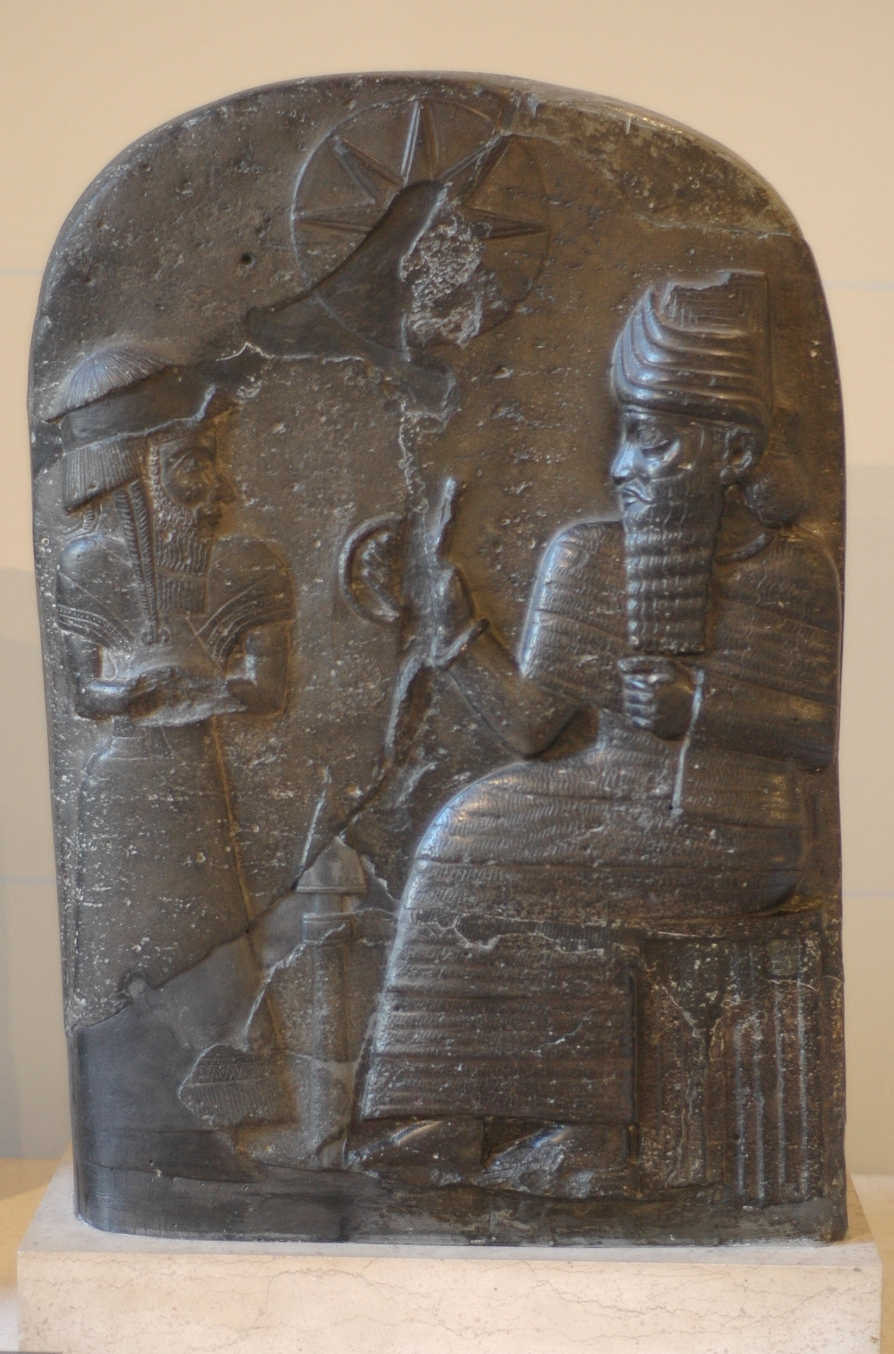

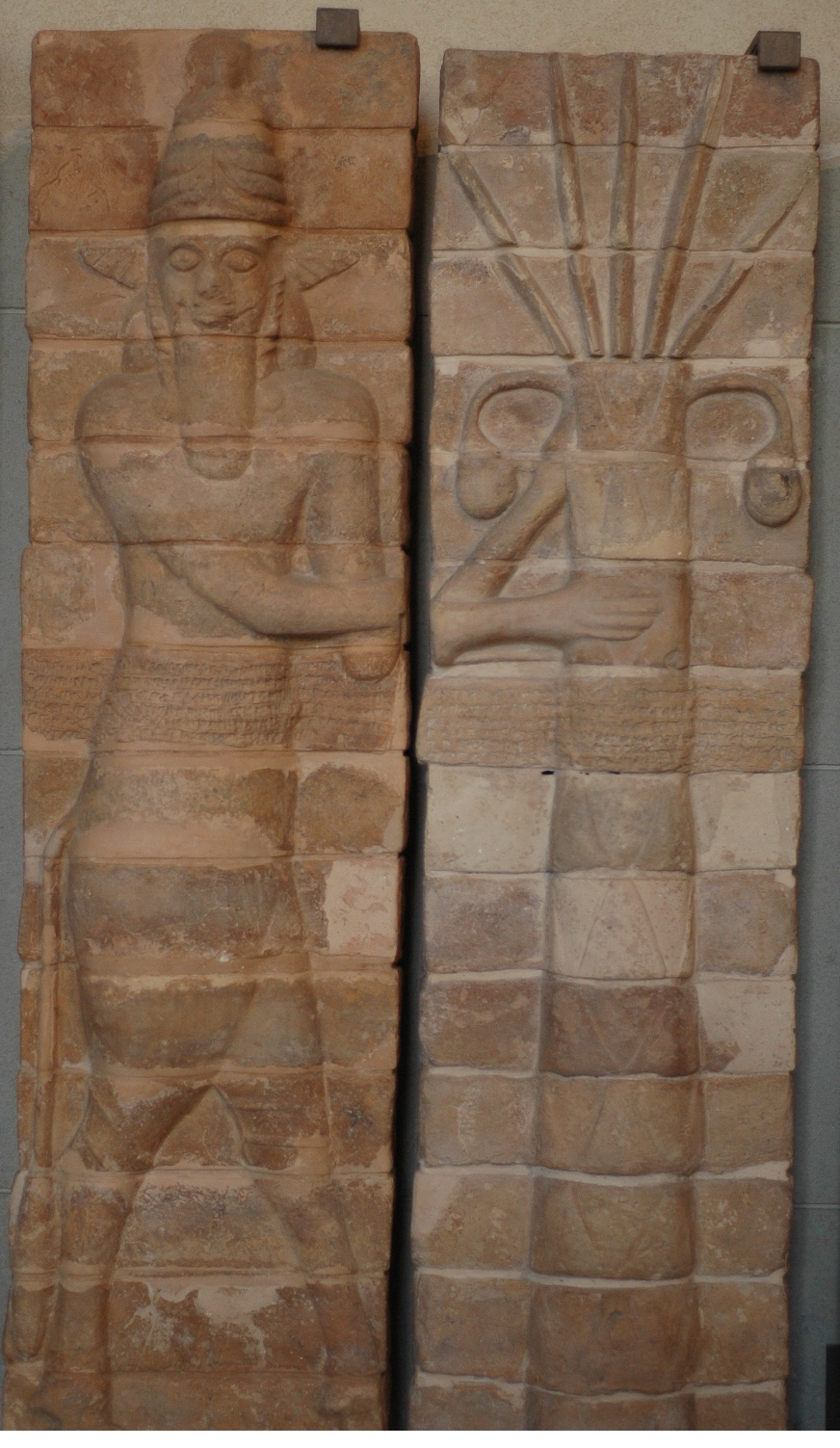

== See also ==
- Elam
- Awan dynasty
- Shimashki dynasty
- Sukkalmah dynasty
- List of rulers of Elam
- List of Assyrian kings
- List of Babylonian kings
- List of monarchs of Persia
- List of rulers of the pre-Achaemenid kingdoms of Iran
