= Elamite dynasty =

Babylonian kings

Elamite Dynasty
- c. 980 BC — c. 975 BC
- Mar-biti-apla-usur's name in Akkadian cuneiform in the Dynastic Chronicle
- Capital: Babylon
- Common languages: Akkadian language
- Government: Monarchy
- King
  - c. 980 BC: Mar-biti-apla-usur (first and last)
- Historical era: Ancient History
  - Established: c. 980 BC
  - Disestablished: c. 975 BC
- Today part of: Iraq

The Elamite dynasty, also known as the seventh Babylonian dynasty, was a short-lived dynasty of Elamite origin who ruled from the city of Babylon in the early 10th century BC. The dynasty's first and only ruler was Mar-biti-apla-usur.

== History ==
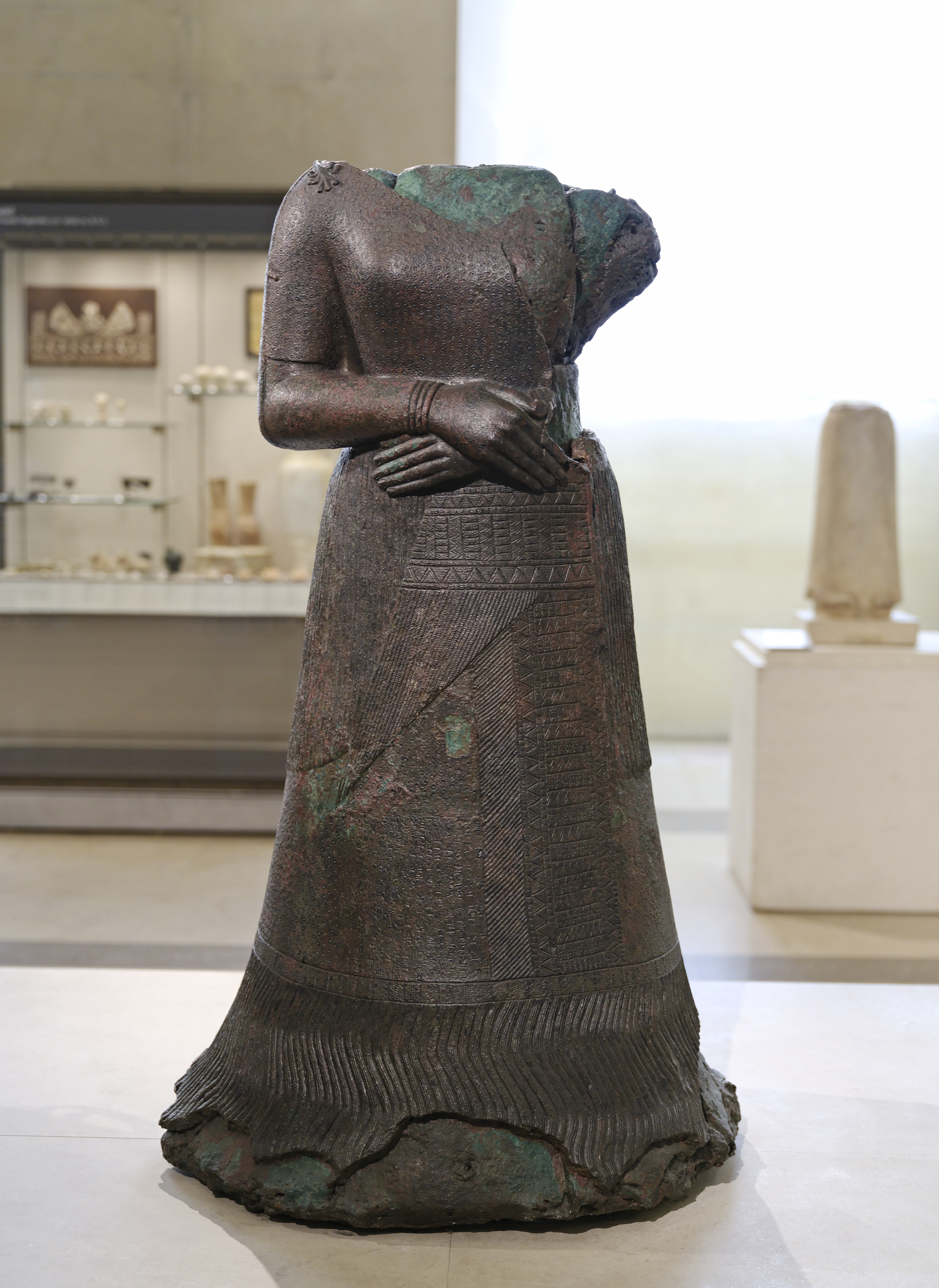
Babylon and Elam had, by the time of the Elamite Dynasty, a long history of contacts. They were involved several times in royal intermarriage, especially in the Kassite period. The Babylonian princess married by Untash-Napirisha (himself the son of a Kassite princess) could be identified with Napir-Asu, whose bronze statue is now at the Louvre.

Babylon's seventh dynasty, also known as the Elamite dynasty, was founded around 980 BC. It was the third of a series of very short lived Babylonian dynasties, namely the Second Sealand Dynasty, the Bazi Dynasty and the Elamite Dynasty. Its first and sole ruler was the Elamite Mar-biti-apla-usur. His regnal name was Akkadian, which was the language spoken in Babylon at the time. However, since no known rulers of Elam are known to have carried Akkadian titles (though Mār-bīti-apla-uṣur was his Babylonian name, and his reign coincides with a blank period in Elamite political history), Brinkman has argued that he might not have been himself from Elam, nor the patrilineal descendant of an Elamite, but rather a Babylonian with some Elamite ancestor (possibly a king).

=== Fall of the Dynasty ===
The dynasty's reign might have suffered Aramean incursions, because of which the Akitu festival might have been suspended. (Note: Eclectic Chronicle (ABC 24) tablet BM 27859 line 16.) After his death, the dynasty's sole ruler Mar-biti-apla-usur was buried in the palace of Sargon as a “legitimate king.” This designation depends on the interpretation of ina É-GAL LUGAL(-)GI.NA qé.bir, suggesting an interment suitable for a rightful king.

== List of kings of the Elamite Dynasty ==
Name	Reign	Succession and notes	Ref
Mar-biti-apla-usur; Mār-bīti-apla-uṣur	c. 980 – 975 BC (6 years)	First and last member of the dynasty	
