= List of Elamite kings =

King of Elam
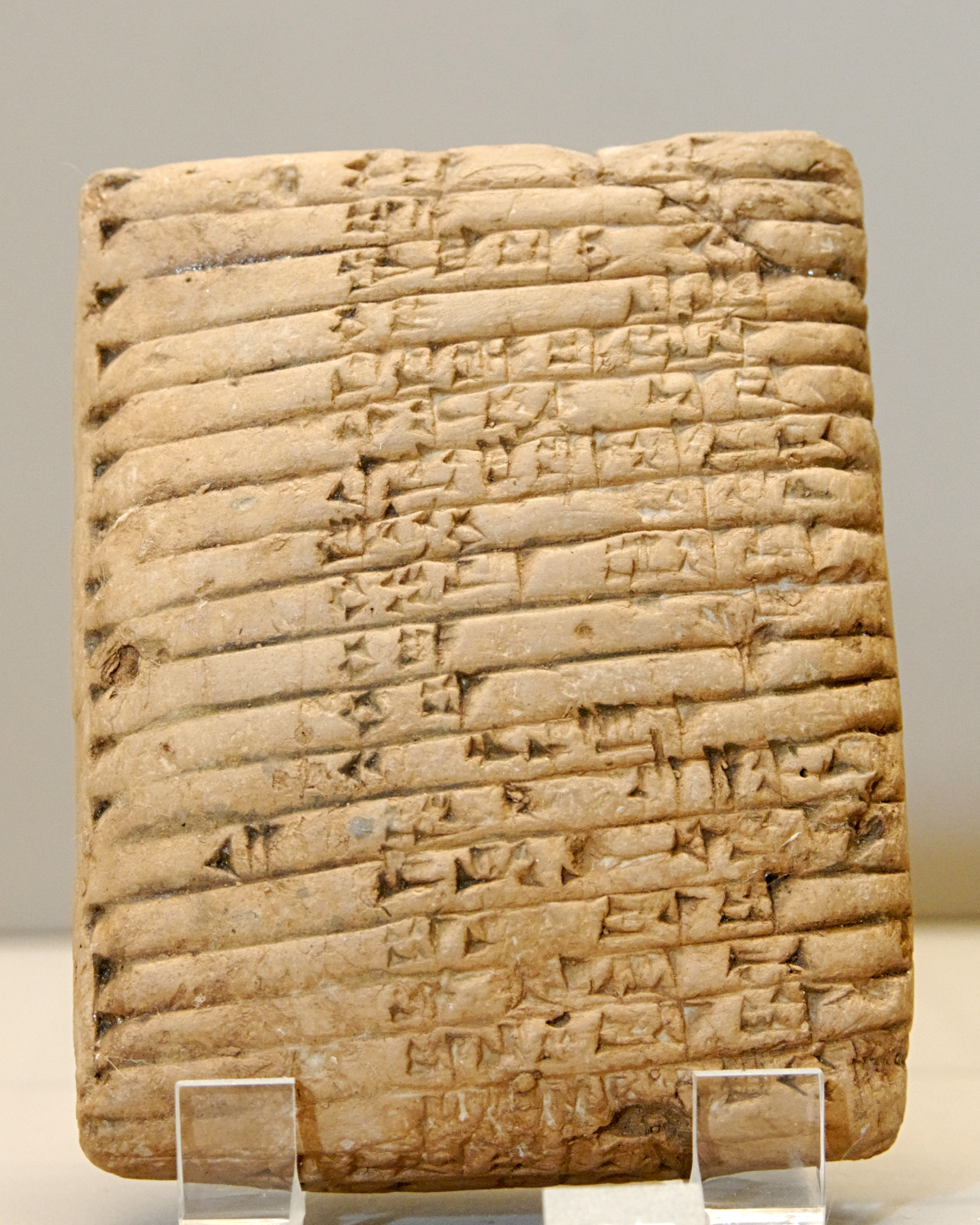
- Ancient Elamite king list, listing kings of the Awan and Shimashki dynasties

Details
- First monarch: Peli (king list); Hishep-ratep (verified)
- Last monarch: Atta-hamiti-Inshushinak II
- Formed: c. 2500 BC
- Abolished: 520 or 519 BC

The kings of Elam were the rulers of Elam, an ancient civilization and kingdom in south-western Iran. The earliest known Elamite dynasty was the Awan dynasty, which came to power in the Early Dynastic period. Elam was conquered by the Akkadian Empire around 2325 BC and was then ruled by a sequence of Akkadian-appointed governors before independence was restored a little over a century later. After the reign of the powerful Elamite king Puzur-Inshushinak, Elam was conquered again c. 2100 BC by the Sumerian Third Dynasty of Ur. Native Elamite rule was after a few decades restored under the Shimashki dynasty during the reign of Ur III king Ibbi-Sin. In c. 2004 BC the Shimashki king Kindattu sacked Ur, whereafter Elam became fully independent. The Sukkulmah dynasty, perhaps a related lineage, was established in another part of Elam shortly thereafter, and after a period of overlap gradually overtook the Shimashki dynasty.

The Sukkalmah dynasty was followed by the Kidinuid and Igihalkid dynasties, whereafter the Elamite kingdom reached the height of its power under the Shutrukid dynasty. Powerful Shutrukid kings, such as Shutruk-Nahhunte I and Shilhak-Inshushinak, exerted dominion over not only Elam itself but also over Babylonia. The kingdom may have disintegrated following the defeat of Hutelutush-Inshushinak by the Babylonian king Nebuchadnezzar I in the late 12th century BC, but a new line of rulers are attested in Elam from the early 8th century BC onwards. The so-called Neo-Elamite kingdom came under the rule of the Hubanid dynasty in the early 7th century BC, which initiated a short period of intense internal conflict and meddling in Assyrian and Babylonian affairs. The Neo-Elamite kingdom was effectively destroyed by the Assyrian king Ashurbanipal in 646 BC, though Elamite rulers continued to govern the Elamite heartland until the rise and early years of the Achaemenid Empire in the late 6th century BC.

The Elamites created a new kingdom, Elymais, around 147 BC. Initially ruled by the Kamnaskirid dynasty, Elymais often fell under the control of the Parthian Empire as a vassal state, and eventually came under the rule of a cadet branch of the Parthian Arsacid dynasty. Following the fall of the Parthian Empire and the rise of the succeeding Sasanian Empire in the early 3rd century AD, Elymais was conquered and abolished as a distinct kingdom, marking the final end of Elamite political history.

== Early Elam (c. 2500–2100 BC) ==
=== Awan dynasty (c. 2500 – c. 2100 BC) ===
The Awan dynasty is the earliest known royal dynasty of Elam. "Awan" was a native Elamite term, referring mainly to modern Khuzestan but also perhaps to the entire Elamite kingdom. Its use as a dynastic name comes from both Old Babylonian sources, which designated the kings of the earliest Elamite dynasty as belonging to the "Awan dynasty", and a native Elamite king list of the Awan and succeeding Shimashki dynasties. The rulers preceding Hishep-ratep and Luh-ishan fall into the Early Dynastic period, though their historicity beyond appearing in the king list cannot be verified. If real, the first king mentioned in the king list (Peyli) could speculatively be placed sometime in between c. 2550 – c. 2400 BC. The Awan dynasty was not an entirely contiguous family line and was for a little over a century interrupted by governors appointed by the Akkadian Empire.

(Portrait)	Name	Reign	Succession and notes	Ref
Peyli (Note: The Sumerian King List also contains a set of three unnamed rulers of the "Awan dynasty"; based on the chronology of the king list, they would have ruled around 2600 BC. The Sumerian King List is however not considered to be of historical value for rulers before Sargon of Akkad (24th century BC) and it is unlikely that Elamite rulers at this early stage exerted influence in Mesopotamia.)		Uncertain, c. 2500 BC (?)	Historicity uncertain, attested only in the Awan King List	
Tata		Uncertain	Historicity uncertain, attested only in the Awan King List	
Ukkutahesh		Uncertain	Historicity uncertain, attested only in the Awan King List	
Hishur		Uncertain	Historicity uncertain, attested only in the Awan King List	
Shushuntarana		Uncertain	Historicity uncertain, attested only in the Awan King List	
Napilhush		Uncertain	Historicity uncertain, attested only in the Awan King List	
Kikku-siwe-tempt		Uncertain	Historicity uncertain, attested only in the Awan King List	
Hishep-ratep (Note: The Awan King List places Hishep-ratep after Luh-ishan, but texts written by their contemporary Sargon of Akkad refer to Hishep-ratep as Luh-ishan's father.)		c. 2350 BC	Earliest historically verified Elamite king. Elam was in his reign invaded by Sargon of Akkad (r. 2334–2279 BC), who defeated Hishep-ratep and his son Luh-ishan in battle and occupied most of Khuzestan.	
Luh-ishan		c. 2350 – c. 2325 BC	Son of Ḫišibrasini (may have been the same person as Hishep-ratep)	
Emahshini		Uncertain, c. 2280 BC (?)	Does not appear in the Awan King List. On the news of Sargon of Akkad's death, Emahshini and his ally Abalgamash of Marhasi invaded and retook Khuzestan. Shortly thereafter, Sargon's son Rimush (r. 2279–2270 BC) retaliated and retook Khuzestan.	
Autalummash		Uncertain, before 2270 BC (?)	Does not appear in the Awan King List. Attested as an Elamite king from a Hurrian-language text found at Boghazkoy (Hattusa), dated to before the reign of Manishtushu, king of Akkad.	
After conquests by Rimush and Manishtushu (r. 2270–2255 BC), Elam was incorporated into the Akkadian Empire and placed under a series of royally appointed governors.
Eshpum		c. 2269 – c. 2255 BC	Governor of Elam, appointed by Manishtushu	
	Ilshu-rabi	c. 2269 – c. 2255 BC	Governor of Pashime (along the coastal territories of Elam), appointed by Manishtushu	
Khita (Note: Khita has sometimes been identified with the name Hita'a, which appears in the Awan King List, but Khita is attested as a contemporary of the Akkadian king Naram-Sin and Hita'a, if real, must be chronologically placed after the fall of the Akkadian Empire.)		c. 2250 BC	Governor of Elam (Susa) appointed by Naram-Sin (r. 2254–2218 BC), known from a treaty concluded with Naram-Sin	
	Epirmupi	c. 2175 – c. 2154 BC	Akkadian. Originally a governor of Elam (Susa) appointed by Naram-Sin or Shar-Kali-Sharri (r. 2217–2193 BC) but achieved independence during the collapse of the Akkadian Empire.	
Ili-ishmani		c. 2150 BC	Akkadian. Presumably Epirmupi's successor, continued to use the title of governor.	
Hi'elu		c. 2125 BC	Resumed native Elamite rule. Historicity uncertain, attested only in the Awan King List.	
Hita'a		c. 2125 BC	Historicity uncertain, attested only in the Awan King List. He may have been the same person as Khita.	
	Puzur-Inshushinak	c. 2125 – c. 2110 BC	Contemporary of Ur-Nammu of Ur (r. 2112–2094 BC) and Gudea of Lagash. Described as the "creator of the first Iranian empire", Puzur-Inshushinak reunified Khuzestan and Elam and conquered large parts of southern Mesopotamia before being defeated by Ur-Nammu and Gudea.	

== Old Elamite period (c. 2050–1500 BC) ==
=== Shimashki dynasty (c. 2050 – c. 1850 BC) ===
After the reign of Puzur-Inshushinak there was renewed Mesopotamian control of Elam under Third Dynasty of Ur, an empire established by the Sumerian king Ur-Nammu in c. 2112 BC. Though somewhat tenuous, Sumerian rule in Elam was strong enough for the kings of Ur to engage in diplomacy with other Iranian regions. Sumerian imperialism was eventually met with Elamite resistance, most notably in the region of Shimashki, from which a new dynasty (though its precise boundaries are not clear) extended its rule into the lands surrounding Susa. Twelve kings of the Shimashki dynasty are known by name from the same ancient king list also listing the kings of the Awan dynasty. The king Ebarti II, attached to the Shimashki dynasty in the king list tablet between Tan-Ruhuratir I and Idattu II, has in this list been placed in the succeeding Sukkalmah dynasty, which traced its descent from him.

The rulers of the Shimashki dynasty are beyond the king list confirmed by their own inscriptions and by surviving sources from Mesopotamia. Though later portions of the list might record sequential rule, it is likely that the rulers recorded before Kindattu were contemporary rivals or co-rulers, rather than rulers in sequence, since Girnamme, Tazitta I and Ebarti I all appear in the inscriptions of Shu-Sin of Ur (r. 2037–2028 BC). Ebarti I appears to have been the most prominent of the three, though they all belonged to the same family lineage. Ebarti I initiated an age of expansion of the Shimashki realm, which was continued under Kindattu, who sacked Ur and ended the Third Dynasty of Ur. After Kindattu's sack of Ur, Elam became fully independent under the Shimashki rulers.

(Portrait)	Name	Reign	Succession and notes	Ref
Girnamme		Uncertain, c. 2044 BC (?)	Contemporary and relative of Tazitta I and Ebarti I	
Tazitta I		Uncertain, c. 2040 BC (?)	Contemporary and relative of Girnamme and Ebarti I	
Ebarti I		Uncertain, c. 2037 BC (?)	Attested from the late reign of the Ur III king Shulgi (r. 2094–2046 BC) to the reign of Shu-Sin (r. 2037–2028 BC). Contemporary and relative of Girnamme and Tazitta I.	
Tazitta II		Uncertain, c. 2033 BC (?)	Uncertain connection	
Lurak-luhhan (Note: Reading uncertain, some scholars note the uncertainty by referring to him as "Lu-[...]-uhhan".)		Uncertain, c. 2028 BC (?)	Uncertain connection	
Kindattu		Uncertain, c. 2016 BC (?)	Son of Ebarti I, sacked Ur and destroyed the Third Dynasty of Ur	
Imazu		Uncertain, c. 2015 BC (?)	Son of Kindattu, attested as king of Anshan by contemporary seal but omitted from the Shimashki king list, perhaps a junior ruler. Married a daughter of Iddin-Dagan of Isin (r. 1974–1954 BC).	
Idattu I		Uncertain, c. 1995 BC (?)	Son of Kindattu	
Tan-Ruhuratir I		Uncertain, c. 1990 BC (?)	Son of Idattu I, married a daughter of Bilalama of Eshnunna	
	Idattu II	Uncertain, c. 1965 BC (?)	Son of Tan-Ruhuratir I	
Idattunapir		Uncertain, c. 1890 BC (?)	Uncertain connection, contemporary of Sumu-abum of Babylon (r. 1894–1881 BC)	
Idattutemti		Uncertain, c. 1880 BC (?)	Uncertain connection	

=== Sukkalmah dynasty (c. 1980 – c. 1500 BC) ===
The Sukkalmah dynasty came to power shortly after the fall of the Third Dynasty of Ur, though it overlapped with the Shimashki dynasty for well over a century. The dynastic shift probably reflects a gradual change in power, perhaps the two dynasties began as a single royal family of co-rulers in different geographical regions. The Sukkalmah period was one of the most prosperous in Elamite history, marked by unprecedented prestige and influence. Elam was frequently a powerbroker in Mesopotamian politics, entering into uneasy alliances with various states and rulers. Several new developments also took place within Elam during this time. Notably, rulers did not use the title of king, but rather sukkalmah ("grand regent") and sukkal ("regent") of Elam, Shimashki or Susa. The use of sukkalmah, from which the dynasty received its name, originates from Mesopotamia, where it was used as a title ranking below king. In Elam, its usage as the term for the region's paramount ruler might derive from the title possibly being used by the vassals or governors in Susa during the rule of the Third Dynasty of Ur.

The transition from the Shimashki to the Sukkalmah age is obscure. It seems that the two sequences of rulers were connected; the first Sukkalmah ruler, Ebarti II, is in inscriptions referenced as the father of the succeeding Shilhaha but also appears in a king list recording the Shimashki kings and is identified in some later sources as "king of Anshan and Susa", not as sukkalmah. The political structure of Elam during the Sukkalmah period is not entirely clear; whereas some scholars believe there to have been a single line of rulers reigning in sequence, others believe, due to the different titles and capitals attested, that rulership was exercised as a triumvirate, with the paramount ruler (the sukkalmah at Susa) ruling together with junior rulers (sukkals) of "Elam" and "Shimashki".

The sequence of rulers below follows the most probable sequence of Sukkalmah rulers, per Peyronel (2018), with additional rulers inserted in their chronological placements per Potts (1999). It is impossible to establish the length of any of their reigns, though they can at times be chronologically pinpointed through synchronisms with Mesopotamian rulers. Some internal order can however be imposed in the later portion using cuneiform documents and sealings. These sources also support a proposal that Atta-hushu and Sumu-abum of Babylon were contemporaries.

(Portrait)	Name	Reign	Succession and notes	Ref
Seal of King Ebarat Louvre Museum Sb 6225 (detail of King Ebarat)	Ebarti II	Uncertain, c. 1980 BC (?)	Typically the first ruler assigned to the Sukkalmah dynasty	
Shilhaha		Uncertain, c. 1950 BC (?)	Son of Ebarti II	
Pala-ishshan		Uncertain, c. 1920 BC (?)	Uncertain connection	
Lankuku		Uncertain, c. 1900 BC (?)	Lower-ranking ruler contemporary with Pala-ishshan?	
Kuku-sanit		Uncertain, c. 1900 BC (?)	Lower-ranking ruler contemporary with Pala-ishshan?	
Kuk-Kirmash		Uncertain, c. 1900 BC (?)	Son of a sister of Shilhaha or Lankuku (?)	
Kuk-Nashur I		Uncertain	Son of Shilhaha	
Tem-sanit		Uncertain	Lower-ranking ruler contemporary with Kuk-Nashur I?	
Kuk-Nahundi		Uncertain	Lower-ranking ruler contemporary with Kuk-Nashur I?	
Atta-hushu		Uncertain, c. 1894 BC (?)	Descendant of Shilhaha	
Tetep-mada		Uncertain	Descendant of Shilhaha	
Shiruk-tuh		Late 19th (& early 18th?) century BC	Descendant of Shilhaha	
Simut-wartash I		Uncertain	Son of Shiruk-tuh, lower-ranking ruler contemporary with his father?	
Siwe-palar-huppak		First half of the 18th century BC	Son of a sister of Shiruk-tuh	
Kudu-zulush I		First half of the 18th century BC	Son of a sister of Shiruk-tuh	
Kutir-Nahhunte I		Uncertain	Son of Shiruk-tuh	
Atta-mera-halki		Uncertain	Lower-ranking ruler contemporary with Kutir-Nahhunte I?	
Tata		Uncertain	Lower-ranking ruler contemporary with Kutir-Nahhunte I?	
Lila-irtash		Uncertain	Brother of Kutir-Nahhunte I, lower-ranking ruler contemporary with his brother?	
Temti-Agun		Uncertain	Claimed to be the son of a sister of Shiruk-tuh	
Kutir-Shilhaha		Uncertain	Uncertain connection	
Kuk-Nashur II		Middle 17th century BC	Son of a sister of Temti-Agun	
Temti-raptash		Uncertain		
Simut-wartash II		Uncertain	Lower-ranking ruler contemporary with Kuk-Nashur II?	
Kudu-zulush II		Uncertain	Uncertain connection	
Sirtuh		Uncertain	Son of a sister of Kuk-Nashur II, lower-ranking ruler contemporary with Kudu-zulush II?	
Kuk-Nashur III		Uncertain	Descendant of Shilhaha	
Tan-Uli		Uncertain	Descendant of Shilhaha	
Temti-halki		Uncertain	Descendant of Shilhaha	
Kuk-Nashur IV		Late 16th century BC (?)	Son of a sister of Tan-Uli	

== Middle Elamite period (c. 1500–1000 BC) ==
=== Kidinuid dynasty (c. 1500–1400 BC) ===
Though they are grouped together by historians as a dynasty for convenience, there is no evidence that the five kings assigned to the Kidinuid dynasty were related to each other. The chronological sequence of the five kings is not certain either, but Kidinu was traditionally believed to have been the earliest and the group is thus referred to as "Kidinuid". In terms of historical periodization, this period of Elamite history is conventionally referred to as Middle Elamite I (ME I).

Name	Reign	Succession and notes	Ref
Igi-hatet	Early 15th century BC	Known from a single inscription. The grammatical features of the inscription suggests that Igi-hatet was the earliest Middle Elamite ruler. From this point on rulers no longer use the title sukkalmah.	
Kidinu	Early 15th century BC	Known from a single tablet which contains an impression of his seal	
Tan-Ruhuratir II	Early 15th century BC	Known from a single tablet which contains an impression of his seal	
Shalla	Uncertain	Immediate predecessor of Tepti-Ahar (?), known from legal and administrative texts	
Tepti-Ahar	Late 15th century BC	Known from inscribed bricks	
Inshushinak-shar-ili	Late 15th century BC	Known from inscribed bricks	

=== Igihalkid dynasty (c. 1400 – c. 1200 BC) ===
The second dynasty of the Middle Elamite period is typically referred to as the Igihalkid dynasty, after its founder Igi-halki. In terms of historical periodization, this period of Elamite history is conventionally referred to as Middle Elamite II (ME II).

(Portrait)	Name	Reign	Succession and notes	Ref
Igi-halki (Note: Though still recognized as the progenitor of the Igihalkid dynasty, Igi-halki's status as king has been called into question in recent scholarship since the only inscription which was thought to explicitly identify him as king was re-assigned to the earlier Igi-hatet.)		Uncertain, c. 1400 BC (?)	Probably a usurper	
Pahir-ishshan		Uncertain, c. 1390 BC (?)	Son of Igi-halki, married a sister of the Babylonian king Kurigalzu I	
Attar-kittah		Uncertain, c. 1380 BC (?)	Son of Igi-halki	
Humban-numena I		Uncertain, c. 1370 BC (?)	Son of Attar-kittah, married a daughter of the Babylonian king Kurigalzu I	
Untash-Napirisha		Uncertain, c. 1340 BC (?)	Son of Humban-numena, married a daughter of the Babylonian king Burnaburiash II (r. 1359–1333 BC), campaigned in Mesopotamia	
Hurbatila (Note: Babylonian sources record Hurbatila as "king of Elammat" which has led some to suggest that he ruled a separate kingdom near Elam; since Babylonian sources otherwise use "Elamti" (i.e. Elam) and "Elammat" interchangeably, such a conclusion is not supported by the evidence.)		Late 14th century BC	Uncertain connection, fought with, and defeated by, the Babylonian king Kurigalzu II (r. 1332–1308 BC)	
Unpahash-Napirisha		Late 14th/early 13th century BC	Son of Pahir-ishshan, unclear how he acceded to the throne (Note: The unexpected accessions of Unpahash-Napirisha and Kidin-Hutran I before Untash-Napirisha's son Kidin-Hutran II was in the past sometimes interpreted as indicating that the kingdom was divided into several smaller realms and that there was thus not a single line of succession. This was thought to be supported by inscriptions by kings from this time variously using "king of Susa and Anshan" and "king of Anshan and Susa"; documentary evidence however shows that kings used both titles, in different contexts.)	
Kidin-Hutran I		Uncertain, c. 1240 BC (?)	Son of Pahir-ishshan	
Kidin-Hutran II		Uncertain, c. 1235 BC (?)	Son of Unpahash-Napirisha	
Napirisha-Untash		Uncertain, c. 1230 BC (?)	Son of Kidin-Hutran II	
Kidin-Hutran III		Uncertain, c. 1217 BC (?)	Existence inferred through records of a Kidin-Hutran at the end of the 13th century; invaded Babylonia, fighting against kings Enlil-nadin-shumi (r. 1224 BC) and Adad-shuma-iddina (r. 1222–1217 BC), briefly occupied the country	

It is not clear how the Igihalkid dynasty came to an end, but Kidin-Hutran III, who died at some point in the early reign of the Babylonian king Adad-shuma-usur (r. 1216–1187 BC), is generally regarded to have been the last member.

=== Shutrukid dynasty (c. 1200 – c. 1000 BC) ===
The third and last dynasty of the Middle Elamite period is typically referred to as the Shutrukid dynasty, after its founder Shutruk-Nahhunte I. In terms of historical periodization, this period of Elamite history is conventionally referred to as Middle Elamite III (ME III). Though the last extensive records of the dynasty are from the time of Hutelutush-Inshushinak in the late 12th century BC, sparse later texts suggest that the Shutrukid dynasty might have stayed in power until the middle or late 11th century BC.

(Portrait)	Name	Reign	Succession and notes	Ref
	Shutruk-Nahhunte I	Uncertain, c. 1190 BC (?)	"Son of Hallutash-Inshushinak", (Note: Since Hallutash-Inshushinak is not attested as king, Shutruk-Nakhunte was presumably the founder and first ruler of the royal dynasty.) unconnected to the previous royal dynasty. Married a daughter of the Babylonian king Meli-Shipak (r. 1186–1172 BC). Invaded Babylonia in the 1150s, deposing Zababa-shuma-iddin (r. 1158 BC) and tenuously claiming the Babylonian throne for himself. Captured large amounts of treasure, including the Victory Stele of Naram-Sin.	
Kutir-Nahhunte II		c. 1155 BC	Son of Shutruk-Nahhunte I, invaded Babylonia and stole the religiously important statue of Marduk	
Shilhak-Inshushinak I		c. 1150 – c. 1120 BC	Son of Shutruk-Nahhunte I, maintained an unusually powerful hold on Mesopotamia, controlling many cities that normally fell under the sway of Babylonia or Assyria	
Hutelutush-Inshushinak		c. 1120 – c. 1115 BC	Son of Shilhak-Inshushinak, used the unparallelled title "king of Elam and Susiana". Elam was in his reign invaded by the Babylonian king Nebuchadnezzar I (r. 1121–1100 BC), who recovered the statue of Marduk and extensively pillaged Elam. Some sources hold that Hutelutush-Inshushinak disappeared after the defeat but he appears to have held onto power in Elam for some time.	
Shilhina-hamru-Lagamar		Early 11th century	Son of Shilhak-Inshushinak, mentioned as king in later inscriptions by the Neo-Elamite king Shutur-Nahhunte II	
Humban-numena II (Note: Humban-numena II is sometimes alternatively placed as the direct predecessor of the later Humban-tahra and as the progenitor of the First Neo-Elamite dynasty, ruling in the 770s BC.)		Middle/late 11th century (?)	Possibly connected to the Shutrukid dynasty, mentioned as king in later inscriptions by the Neo-Elamite king Shutruk-Nahhunte II	

== Neo-Elamite period (c. 1000–520/519 BC) ==
=== Elamite Dark Ages (c. 1000–760 BC) ===
The Neo-Elamite period spans the centuries from the fall of the Shutrukid dynasty to the rise of the Achaemenid Empire. After the defeat of Hutelutush-Inshushinak in 1100 BC, the historical record of Elam is extremely scant for well over three centuries, a period often called the "Elamite Dark Ages". As a result, the political organization and administration of Elam in the early Neo-Elamite period is more or less completely unknown. Some form of Elamite royal authority appears to have been active from at least the late 9th century BC onwards, since Elamite troops were sent to support the Babylonian king Marduk-balassu-iqbi against the Assyrian king Shamshi-Adad V (r. 824–811 BC). An Elamite ambassador to Assyria is also attested in the reign of the Assyrian king Adad-nirari III (r. 811–783 BC).

=== First Neo-Elamite dynasty (c. 760–688 BC) ===
Elam was clearly a consolidated kingdom with strong royal authority by the first half of the 8th century BC, when the country and its rulers once more begin to appear frequently in Mesopotamian texts. The earliest known dynasty of rulers from the Neo-Elamite period is conventionally referred to simply as the First Neo-Elamite dynasty.

Name	Reign	Succession and notes	Ref
Humban-tahra	c. 760–743 BC	Earliest Neo-Elamite king mentioned by name in Babylonian sources	
Humban-nikash I	743–717 BC	Son of Humban-tahra, allied with the Babylonian king Marduk-apla-iddina II against the Assyrian king Sargon II	
Shutruk-Nahhunte II	717–699 BC	Son of a daughter of Humban-tahra and the nobleman Humban-immena. His name was originally Shutur-Nahhunte but he amended it to Shutruk-Nahhunte to evoke the memory of Shutruk-Nahhunte I.	
Hallutash-Inshushinak I	699–693 BC	Brother of Shuktruk-Nahhunte II; son of a daughter of Humban-tahra and the nobleman Humban-immena	
Kutur-Nahhunte (Kutir-Nahhunte III)	693–692 BC	Son of Hallutush-Inshushinak I, taken prisoner in a rebellion and killed	
Humban-menanu (Humban-numena III)	692–688 BC	Son of Hallutush-Inshushinak I, commanded Elamite and Babylonian forces at the 691 BC Battle of Halule	

=== Hubanid dynasty (688–645 BC) ===
Though sometimes grouped together with the earlier Neo-Elamite kings in a single dynasty, there is no evidence for any kinship between Humban-menanu and Humban-haltash I and Babylonian sources appear to clearly distinguish the two as separate, suggesting that Humban-haltash I founded a new dynastic line. His dynasty is conventionally called the "Hubanid dynasty", after the common name element Humban (sometimes rendered Huban).

(Portrait)	Name	Reign	Succession and notes	Ref
Humban-haltash I		688–681 BC	Obscure king, died from a fever	
Humban-haltash II		681–c. 674 BC	Son of Humban-haltash I	
Urtak		c. 674–664 BC	Son of Humban-haltash I, invaded Babylonia in 664 BC and was killed in battle by the forces of the Assyrian king Ashurbanipal or died shortly after being driven back to Elam	
	Teumman (Tepti-Humban-Inshushinak I)	664–653 BC	Non-dynastic or son of Humban-haltash I, attacked Babylonia in 653 BC and killed by the Assyrians in the Battle of Ulai alongside his son Tammaritu.	
Ummanigash (Humban-nikash II)		653–652 BC (in Madaktu)	Son of Urtak, installed as king by Ashurbanipal as co-ruler with his brother Tammaritu I. Provided troops for the 652 Babylonian revolt of Shamash-shum-ukin against Ashurbanipal, soon thereafter overthrown and murdered by Tammaritu II	
	Tammaritu I	653–652 BC (in Hidalu)	Son of Urtak, installed as king by Ashurbanipal as co-ruler with his brother Ummanigash. Fate unclear.	
Tammaritu II		652–649 BC –(first reign)–	Grandson of Urtak, overthrew and murdered Ummanigash. Also joined Shamash-shum-ukin's revolt against Ashurbanipal, overthrown by his general Indabibi in the midst of battle and escaped to Assyria.	
Indabibi		649–648 BC	General, initially supported Shamash-shum-ukin's revolt but later sought to make peace with Ashurbanipal. Deposed by Elamites after Ashurbanipal declared war in response to Indabibi not answering a diplomatic demand.	
	Humban-haltash III	648–647 BC –(first reign)–	Proclaimed king after the deposition of Indabibi. Abandoned Madaktu and fled into the mountains after Ashurbanipal invaded Elam in 647 BC.	
Humban-habua		647 BC	Briefly seized power after Humban-haltash's flight but shortly thereafter also fled into the mountains	
Tammaritu II		647 BC –(second reign)–	Restored as king by Ashurbanipal, installed at Susa, but shortly thereafter deposed by the Assyrians due to his complaints that they were pillaging his country	
Pa'e		647–646 BC	Short-lived and obscure ruler, seized power since Ashurbanipal did not proclaim any new kings after Tammaritu II	
	Humban-haltash III	646–645 BC –(second reign)–	Retook the throne from Pa'e. Defeated by Ashurbanipal in 646 BC, whereafter the Assyrians laid waste to Elam and nearly destroyed the ancient civilization. Unsuccessful at improving relations with the Assyrians and deeply unpopular with the people, Humban-haltash III was driven from the capital to Luristan, where the locals captured him and sent him to Assyria. Final fate unknown.	

=== Late Elamite kings (c. 645–520/519 BC) ===
Although Humban-haltash III is sometimes identified as the last king of Elam, material and documentation evidence suggests that some parts of Elam, including the region surrounding Susa, remained under the control of Elamite rulers until the time of the Achaemenid Empire. Most of these late rulers, with a few exceptions, had no known familial connections to each other. The sequence below follows the Elamite rulers of Susa and is tentative, with approximate regnal dates, due to the small number of surviving sources.

(Portrait)	Name	Reign	Succession and notes	Ref
Indada		c. 645–635 BC	Father of Shutur-Nahhunte, royal status speculative	
Shutur-Nahhunte (Note: Sometimes enumerated as Shutur-Nahhunte III, after Shutruk-Nahhunte I and Shutruk-Nahhunte II, despite Shutur-Nahhunte and Shutruk-Nahhunte being different names.)		c. 635–610 BC	Son of Indada, engaged in diplomacy with Nabopolassar of Babylon and received Elamite cult statues previously taken by the Assyrians	
Humban-kitin		Late 7th/early 6th century BC	Son of Shutur-Nahhunte	
Hallutash-Inshushinak II		c. 598/593–583/578 BC	Mentioned in Babylonian textual sources	
Humban-Shuturuk		Early 6th century BC	"Son of Shati-hupiti"	
Ummanunu		First half of the 6th century BC	Attested as ruler at Susa by archival texts found in the city	
Bahuri		First half of the 6th century BC	Attested as ruler at Zamin, perhaps contemporary with Ummanunu, in Mesopotamian letters	
Shilhak-Inshushinak II		First half of the 6th century BC	Attested by a royal inscription	
Atta-hamiti-Inshushinak I		First half of the 6th century BC	"Son of Hutran-Tepti"; considered the last great Neo-Elamite king, he adopted the traditional Middle Elamite royal style "king of Anshan and Susa" and went on some military campaigns	
Tepti-Humban-Inshushinak II		c. 550–530 BC	Son of Shilhak-Inshushinak II, possibly a vassal of Cyrus the Great	
Elam incorporated into the Achaemenid Empire c. 530 BC (?)
	Açina	522 BC	"Son of Upadarma"; either a native Elamite or a Persian, revolted against the Achaemenid king Darius I in the Elamite highlands. Defeated and killed by the Achaemenids.	
	Martiya (Humban-nuish)	522 BC	"Son of Cincikhri"; either a native Elamite or a Persian, revolted against Darius I in the Elamite highlands. Took the regnal name Humban-nuish. Defeated and killed by the Achaemenids.	
Atta-hamiti-Inshushinak II		520/519 BC	Revolted against Darius I in the Elamite lowlands. A native Elamite leader, he probably assumed the regnal name Atta-hamiti-Inshushinak to strengthen his claim to the throne. Defeated and killed by the Achaemenids.	
After the defeat of Atta-hamiti-Inshushinak II, Elam was reincorporated into the Achaemenid Empire and ceased to be a political entity.

== Elymais (c. 147 BC–AD 221/222) ==
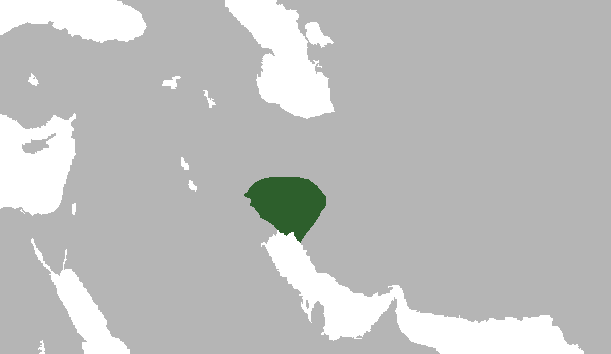
Approximate extent of Elymais in 51 BC

In the mid-2nd century BC, the kingdom of Elymais established control of large parts of ancient Elam, centered in the region of Khuzestan. Though in the past suggested to have been a Persian or Parthian realm, evidence such as the hostility between Elymais and Persian/Parthian rulers and the continued worship of otherwise non-Iranian (perhaps traditional Elamite) deities in the region suggests that the populace of Elymais were descendants of the old Elamites. The connection is further supported by the etymological connection between Elam and Elymais, Elymais probably simply being a Hellenized version of Elam, and that Akkadian-language sources from Babylonia refer to Elymais as "Elam" and its people as "Elamites".

Though the coins of Elymais were struck in Greek, it is possible that Greek was simply a monetary language and that the spoken language in Elam was still the ancient Elamite language. This is reinforced by several of the rulers bearing Elamite names, such as Kamnaskires, Pittit and Anzaze. The name Kamnaskires, borne by several kings, derives from the Elamite kapniškir, meaning "treasurer". Circumstantial evidence also supports the continuity of the Elamite language; in the Acts of the Apostles in the Bible, written in the late 1st century AD, Elamite is referenced as a distinct and living language and some evidence thereafter suggests it survived for far longer. In Arabic sources as late as the 10th century AD there are references to an "incomprehensible" language in Elam dubbed Khūzī, perhaps a late version of Elamite.

Because of the limited surviving source material, the names and dates of the kings of Elymais largely follows evidence from coinage, with some details also known from surviving Babylonian and Parthian documentation.

=== Kamnaskirid dynasty (c. 147 BC–AD 76) ===
(Portrait)	Name	Reign	Succession and notes	Ref
Kamnaskires I Soter		c. 147 BC (?)	First king of Elymais	
	Kamnaskires II Nikephoros	c. 147–139 BC	Successor of Kamnaskires I (Note: There is some dispute as to whether Kamnaskires I and Kamnaskires II were different people or the same king. In the case that they are considered the same person, the regnal numbers of later kings of the same name are decremented by one (i.e. Kamnaskires III becomes Kamnaskires II, etc.).)	
Mithridates I of Parthia invaded Elymais in 140/139 BC due to Elamite support for the Seleucid king Demetrius II Nicator's attempted reconquest of Mesopotamian and other eastern lands. The region was then under direct Parthian control for several decades, with occasional rebellions, until secure autonomous control was re-established under Kamnaskires III and Anzaze around 82 BC.
Okkonapses		c. 139/138–137 BC (Note: Rezakhani (2013) placed Okkonapses significantly earlier, as a local rebel already in 188–187 BC, against the Seleucid king Antiochus III.)	Usurper/rebel	
Tigraios		c. 137–132 BC	Usurper/rebel (Note: Shayegan (2011) speculates that an Elamite prince referenced in Babylonian sources, Kamnaskires Soter, was placed on the Elamite throne by the Parthian king Phraates II after Tigraios's defeat and ruled Elymais 133–130 BC. Other scholars omit this figure.)	
	Darius Soter	c. 129 BC	Usurper/rebel	
Pittit		125–124 BC	Usurper/rebel	
	Kamnaskires III with Anzaze	c. 82–62/61 BC (Note: Kamnaskires III's and Anzaze's coins are attested 82–75 BC. Shayegan (2011) speculated that they ruled until having diplomatic dealings with the Roman general Pompey in 62/61 after which they were replaced by the Parthians with their son, also named Kamnaskires.)	Restored autonomous rule, Kamnaskires III appears to have co-ruled with his queen Anzaze	
	Kamnaskires IV	1st century BC (fl. 62/61–56/55 BC)	Son of Kamnaskires III and Anzaze (?)	
	Kamnaskires V	Late 1st century BC (fl. 36/35 BC)	Poorly attested	
	Kamnaskires VI	Mid/late 1st century AD (fl. AD 68)	Appears to have had a lengthy reign (Note: Kamnaskires VI is always depicted as old on his coins, perhaps reflecting records of an unidentified Kamnaskires living to the age of 96.)	

=== Arsacid dynasty and late kings (c. 76–221/222) ===
After the end of the Kamnaskirid dynasty in the late first century AD, around the year 76, Elymais was ruled by a cadet branch of the Arsacid dynasty, the ruling dynasty of the Parthian Empire. Coins minted by the Arsacid kings of Elymais are highly similar to the coins minted by the Kamnaskirid rulers, though differ in including inscriptions in both Greek and Aramaic, rather than just Greek.

Portrait	Name	Reign	Succession and notes	Ref
	Orodes I	Late 1st century	First Arsacid king of Elymais	
	Orodes II (Kamnaskires-Orodes) (Note: Wiesehöfer (1996) considered Kamnaskires-Orodes to have been a separate king, whom he enumerated as Kamnaskires-Orodes III, most other researchers consider Orodes II and Kamnaskires-Orodes to be the same king.)	Late 1st/early 2nd century	Son of Orodes I	
	Phraates	Late 1st/early 2nd century	Son of Orodes I or II	
	Osroes	2nd century	Successor of Phraates, possibly the same person as the Parthian king Osroes I or an Elamite ruler who closely copied his coins	
	Orodes III with Ulfan	2nd century (fl. 138)	Orodes III appears to have co-ruled with a woman named Ulfan, possibly his queen	
	Abar-Basi	2nd century (fl. 150)	Attested and depicted in the Tang-e Sarvak inscription	
	Orodes IV	2nd/3rd century (crowned c. 165/170)	Possibly the same Orodes as an Orodes attested and depicted in the Tang-e Sarvak inscription. Walter Bruno Henning speculated that Orodes IV was the son of Bel-Dusa, high priest or grand vizier, and was installed as king by his father after the death of Abar-Basi.	
	Khwasak	3rd century (fl. 215)	Ruler of Susa shown in a relief from the city as receiving royal (?) power from the Parthian king Artabanus IV	
	Orodes V	3rd century (fl. 221/222)	Last king of Elymais, attested in accounts of the rise of the Sasanian Empire as being defeated by Ardashir I in 221/222, whereafter Elymais was incorporated into the Sasanian Empire and abolished as a kingdom	

== See also ==
- List of rulers of the pre-Achaemenid kingdoms of Iran
- List of monarchs of Persia
- List of Mesopotamian dynasties
