= Shutruk-Nakhunte =

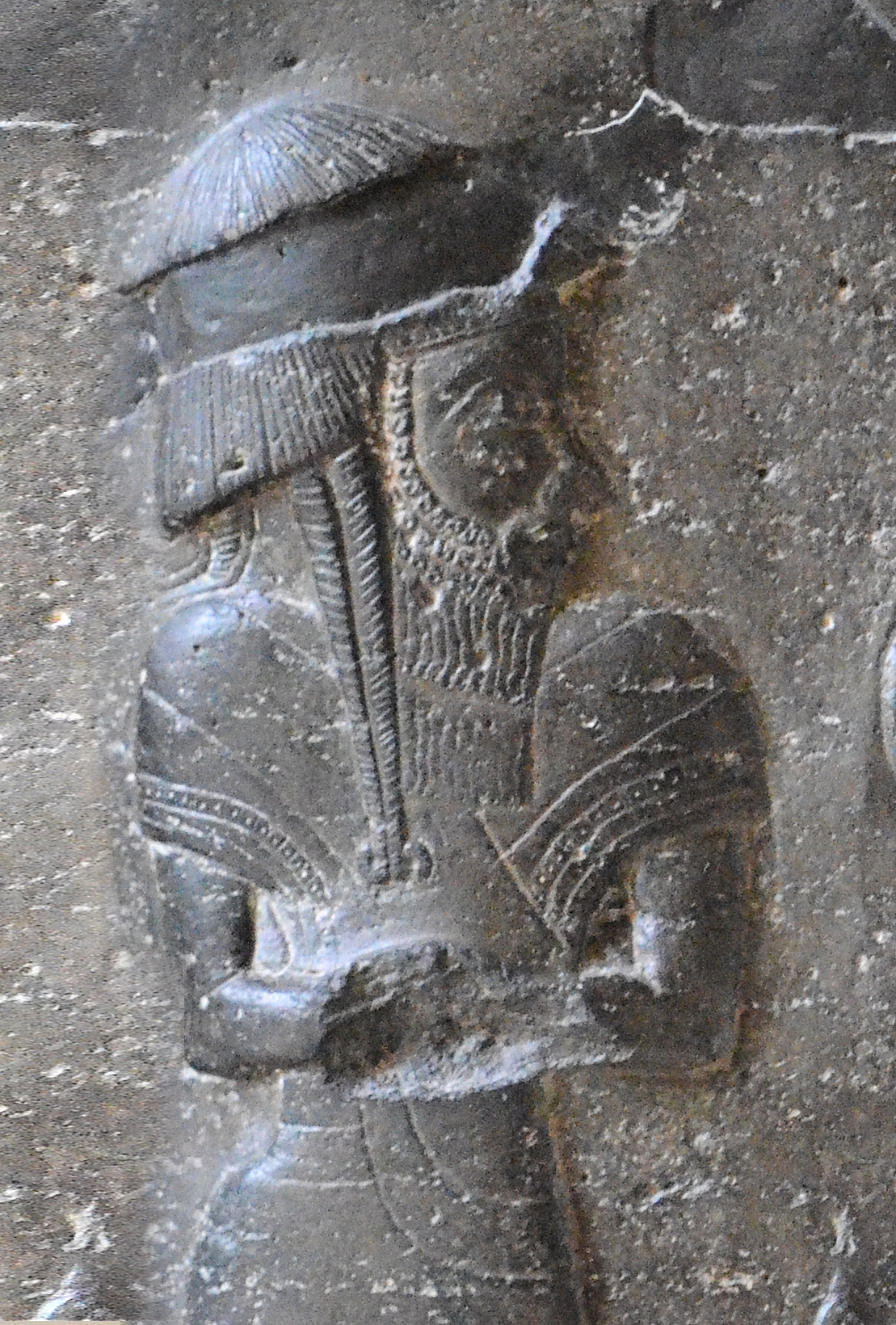
- Shutruk-Nakhunte, sculpted on a stele captured from Babylon and taken to Susa.

King of Elam
- Reign: 1184 to 1155 BCE
- Predecessor: Kidin-Hutran II (?)
- Successor: Kutir-Nahhunte III
- Spouse: Daughter of Melishihu of Babylon
- Dynasty: Shutrukid Dynasty
- Father: Hallutush-Inshushinak

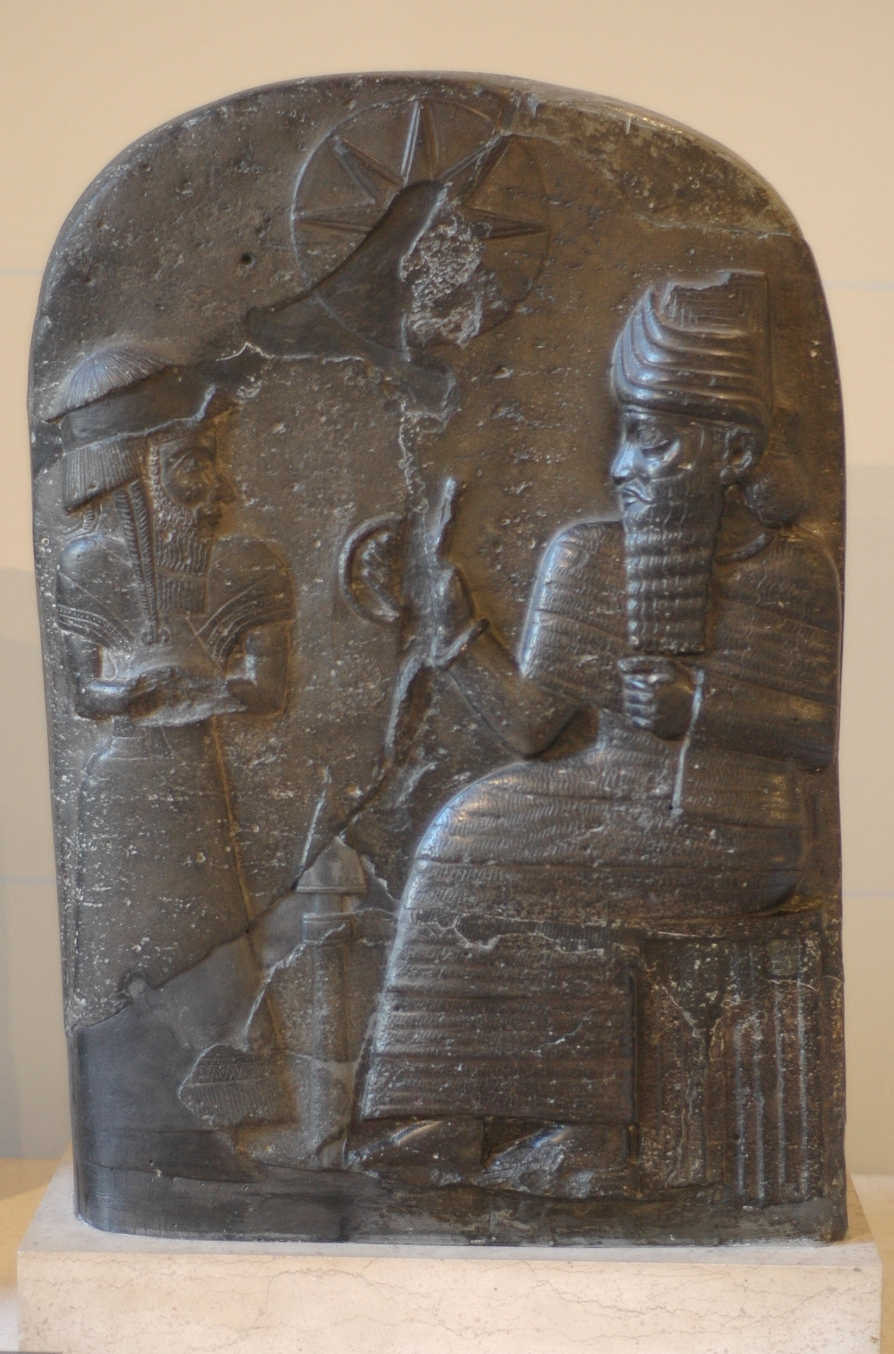
Babylonian stele taken to Susa by Shutruk-Nakhunte, with his image (left) added.

Shutruk-Nakhunte (sometimes Nahhunte) was king of Elam from about 1184 to 1155 BC (middle chronology), and the first king of the Shutrukid Dynasty. He names his father in many of his inscriptions, Hallutush-Inshushinak, but there is no evidence for a king of Elam with that name.

Elam amassed an empire that included most of Mesopotamia and western Iran. Under his command, Elam defeated the Kassites and established the short-lived Elamite Empire, conquered within about 40 years by Nebuchadnezzar I of Babylon, in 1120 BC.

Šutruk-Nakhunte was supposedly married to the daughter of a Kassite king named Meli-Šipak.

== Invasion of Babylonia ==
Shutruk-Nakhunte invaded Kassite Babylonia in the year 1158 BC. He was able to carry off many monuments from cities like Babylon, Sippar and Eshnunna. One famous monument was the Stele of Naram-Sin. His invasion of Babylon likely had to do with the overthrow of the royal Kassite family into whom the Elamites had intermarried for decades. The overthrow of Shutruk-Nakhunte's father-in-law Meli-Shipak II, who lost the throne to Zababa-shuma-iddin, would have given enough justification to Shutruk-Nakhunte to attack Babylon. The cause of Meli-Shipak II's death is unknown, but even if he had died of natural causes, the fact that Zababa-shuma-iddin was elected king would still explain Shutruk-Nakhunte's aggressive attack, since he was a relative of Meli-Shipak II.

== Inscription on the Naram-Sin victory stele ==
Shutruk-Nahhunte is known by an inscription that he added to the Victory Stele of Naram-Sin, itself dated about one millennium earlier to circa 2250 BC. His inscription appears on the top right corner of the stele, on the depiction of a mountainous cone, and was written in Elamite by Shutruk-Nahhunte himself:

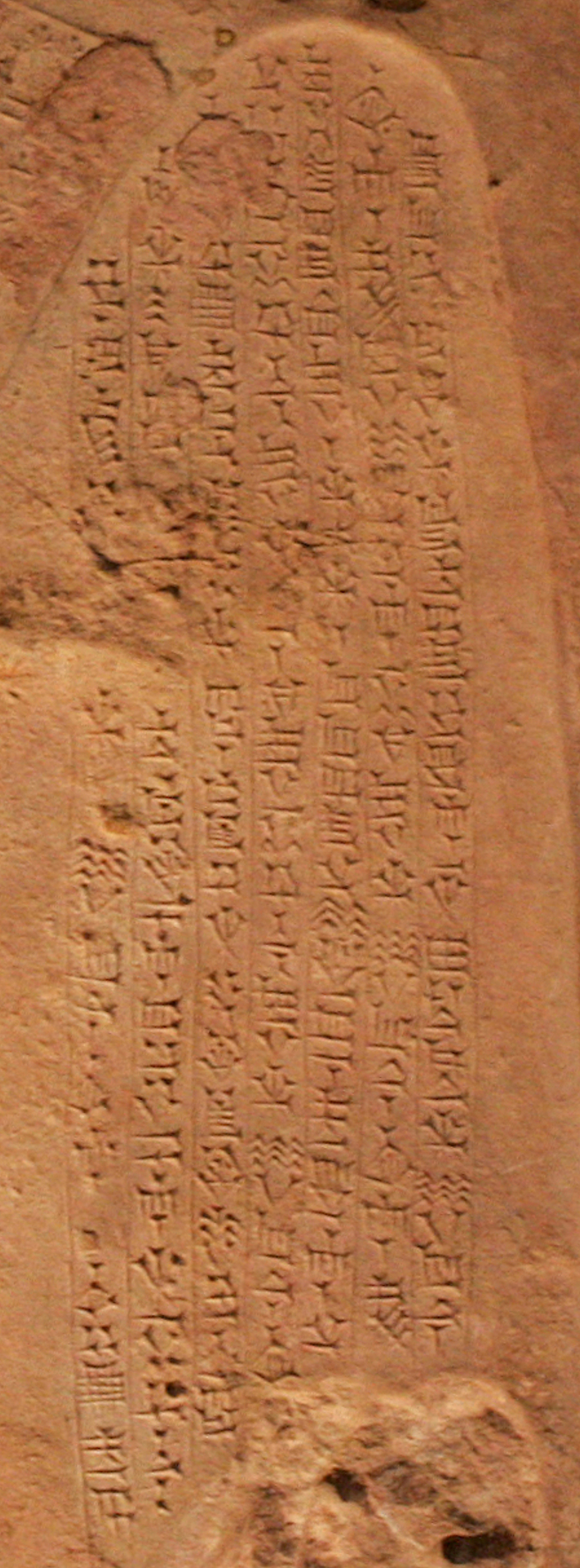
Inscription of Shutruk-Nahhunte in Elamite on the Victory Stele of Naram-Sin.

"I am Shutruk-Nahhunte, son of Hallutush-Inshushinak, beloved servant of the god Inshushinak, king of Anshan and Susa, who has enlarged the kingdom, who takes care of the lands of Elam, the lord of the land of Elam. When the god Inshushinak gave me the order, I defeated Sippar. I took the stele of Naram-Sin and carried it off, bringing it to the land of Elam. For Inshushinak, my god, I set it as an offering."

— Elamite inscription of Shutruk-Nahhunte on the victory stele of Naram-Sin.

== In popular culture ==
Shutruk-Nakhunte gained a small public exposition in Ethan Canin's short story "The Palace Thief", and its adaptation in the 2002 film The Emperor's Club, in which one of the key elements is a plaque describing the exploits of Shutruk-Nakhunte, described as a once famous egomaniacal conqueror virtually unknown today.

The plaque hanging on the wall in the film reads:

'I am Shutruk Nahunte, King of Anshand and Susa, Sovereign of the land of Elam. By the command of Inshushinak I destroyed Sippar, Took the Stele of Niran-Sin, and brought it back to Elam, where I erected it as an offering to my god, Inshushhinak.' — Shutruk-Nahunte, 1158 B.C.’

== Sources ==
- D.T. Potts: The Archaeology of Elam, Cambridge University Press, Cambridge 1999, 232-237

Preceded by Khallutush-Inshushinak	King of Elam; 1184–1155 BC	Succeeded by Kutir-Nahhunte III
