= Mardaman =

Mesopotamian city

- Mardama
- Location within Iraq
- 36°57′31.6″N 42°43′17.4″E
- Type: Settlement
- Periods: Akkadian Empire to Middle Assyrian Empire
- Location: Bassetki, Dohuk Governorate, Iraq
- Region: Mesopotamia

History
- Built: before 2250 BC

Site notes
- Excavation dates: 2013, 2016 - 2019
- Archaeologists: Peter Pfälzner. Dr. Hasan Qasim

Mardaman (modern Bassetki) was a northern Mesopotamian city that existed between ca.2200 and 1200 BC. It was uncovered in 2018 after translation of 92 cuneiform tablets. The tablets were discovered in summer 2017, near the Kurdish village of Bassetki, by a team of archaeologists. The team hailed from Tübingen's Institute for Ancient Near Eastern Studies, and were led by Prof. Dr. Peter Pfälzner of the University of Tübingen. The city-god of Mardaman was the Hurrian goddess Shuwala. After the time of Assyrian occupation it is uncertain if this continued. It is thought that later in the 1st millennium BC a temple of Gula was at Mardaman.

== History ==
The city was occupied from the Ninevite 5 period (c. 2900–2600 BC) until 600 BC.

=== Early Bronze ===
==== Akkadian Period ====
The earliest reference dates to the reign of Naram-Sin of Akkad with a year name being "Year in which Naram-Sin destroyed Maridaban". According to the later Sumerian literary composition The Great Revolt Against Naram-Sin, the city (then named Maridaban - Akkadian: ma-ri-da-ba-an^{ki}) joined under its ruler Duhsusu in the "Great Revolt" against the fourth Akkadian Empire ruler.

==== Ur III Period ====
The city was destroyed, but was later rebuilt and is mentioned by sources from the Third Dynasty of Ur with ruler Shu-Sin attacking Mardaman and using prisoners from there to work the gold and silver mines.

=== Middle Bronze ===
The city was then the center of a kingdom, and was captured by Shamshi-Adad I, Amorite ruler of the Kingdom of Upper Mesopotamia, in 1786.

After his fall, the city became an independent kingdom under the Hurrian ruler Tish-ulme. A text was found at Mari addressed to multiple recipients including Tishe-ulme from Zimri-Lim requesting that they hand over the cities to Zimri-Lim, who would give their city back to them. Earlier it was thought that the text was never sent but it is now understood to be a copy.

"The whole land came under my control; yet every (ruler) kept his father’s throne! I heard it said, “The land of Idamaraṣ, where fortresses are held, heeds Zimri-Lim only.” Now then, WRITE me and I will come to take a sacred oath for you. HAND over a city to me and I shall give it (back) to its owner. As for all of you, and your belongings as well, I shall set you up wherever you say. On hearing my tablet, send promptly to me an answer to my letter"

The relations with Mari seem to have been hostile, also seen in Mardaman's support for Hadnum. The latter changed its alliance from Zimri-Lim to the city of Kurda. Haqba-Hammu, the ruler of Karana and ally of Mari, invaded Hadnum in retaliation, with 2,000 men. Even relief forces from Mardaman could not prevent the capturing of five cities of Hadnum. Another letter in the Mari archives informed Zimri-Lim of the conquest of Mardaman by his allies Quarni-Lim of Andarig and Sharraya of northern Razama. Mardaman suffered another sacking by the Turukkaeans around 1769/1768.

In the Old Babylonian period a letter to the staff of Zimri-Lim in Mari read:

"... Regarding the plants (employed) against ‘the burning of ṣētu-fever’ of the physician (asû) from Mardamân and of the staff physician, about which my lord has written to me: I have sent their plants, which were gathered on a mountain, under seal with my signature to my Lord, and (I have sent) these physicians with La-gamal-abum, together with their plants. My lord has already tried the herb for (curing) ‘the burning of ṣētu-fever’ of the staff physician, but I myself have (also) tried the herb for ‘the burning of ṣētu-fever’ of the Mardamân physician and it worked well ..."

=== Late Bronze ===
During the Middle Assyrian Empire, the city had a final period of prosperity as a governor's seat, under the name Mardama, between 1250 and 1200 BC. Clay tablets indicate the name of the governor, Assur-nasir and list some of his activities.

== Archaeology ==
The ruins of a Bronze Age city in Bassetki were discovered in 2013 during a field search by the University of Tübingen. Since 2016 excavations, led by Prof. Dr. Peter Pfälzner and Dr. Hasan Qasim of the archaeological department in Duhok, have been conducted at the site. Excavation continued in 2018 and 2019.

In 2016, it was discovered that the city had a wall from c. 2700 BC protecting the upper city and an extensive road network, several residential districts and a palatial building. A temple dedicated to Adad, a Mesopotamian weather god, evidently existed there. In summer 2017, the archaeologists excavated 92 tablets dating to the Middle Assyrian Empire, about 1,250 BC in a ceramic vessel that was protected by a thick layer of clay, possibly for storing of the included tablets. The small, partially broken tablets were deciphered by Dr. Betina Faist, who identified Mardaman.

== See also ==
- Cities of the Ancient Near East
- Bassetki Statue
- Shuwala
