= Manzat (goddess) =

Elamite and Mesopotamian goddess of the rainbow

- Goddess of the rainbow
- Major cult center: Deh-e Now, Tappeh Horreeye, Larsa, Der
- Abode: the sky

Genealogy
- Parents: Sin and Ningal (in a single Maqlû incantation)
- Siblings: Shamash (as above)
- Spouse: Simut (in Elam) Ishtaran (in Der)
- Children: Lugalgidda

Manzat (Manzât), also spelled Mazzi'at, Manzi'at and Mazzêt, sometimes known by the Sumerian name Tiranna (^{d}TIR.AN.NA) was a Mesopotamian and Elamite goddess representing the rainbow. She was also believed to be responsible for the prosperity of cities.

In Elam Manzat was worshiped in the lowlands in the proximity of Susa, especially in the area known as Hubshen, associated with the archaeological sites Deh-e Now and Tappeh Horreeye, while in Mesopotamia she was associated with Der, though there is also evidence that she was venerated in Nippur, Larsa and other cities.

== Name ==
Manzat's name is an ordinary Akkadian noun and means "rainbow", though the word's precise etymology is uncertain. A Sumerian form of this goddess' name, Tir-anna ("bow of heaven") is also known, but it was most likely an artificial construct as the sign TIR generally stands for the Sumerian word qištu, "forest", which only acquired the additional meaning "bow" due to similarity to the Akkadian word qaštu, "bow". Tiranna is listed as an alternate name of Manzat in the Weidner god list (line 3') and in An = Anum. The writing ^{d}TIR.AN.NA was also used in the offering lists of the First Sealand dynasty, and sometimes in the writing of theophoric names elsewhere, to logographically represent the theonym Manzat.

== Origin ==
It is generally assumed that Manzat had Akkadian origin. Odette Bowin argues that it is possible that she originated in Elam, as the earliest texts indicating she was worshiped in Mesopotamia were initially incorrectly dated to the Akkadian period, but were subsequently discovered to be from the Ur III period. As such they are more recent than the mention of this goddess in a treaty between the Akkadian Empire and an unspecified Elamite kingdom, and it is therefore possible that Manzat appears there as an Elamite, rather than Mesopotamian, goddess. However, the gods invoked in it are not exclusively Elamite, as indicated by the presence of Ilaba, Išḫara, Ninkarrak and Ninurta. Additionally, according to Tonia Sharlach there is presently no evidence for the introduction of any Elamite deities in the archives of the Third Dynasty of Ur. However, Gary Beckman and Piotr Taracha argue that Pinikir, an Elamite astral goddess, was received by Hurrians from a Mesopotamian intermediary in the late third millennium BCE.

== Character ==
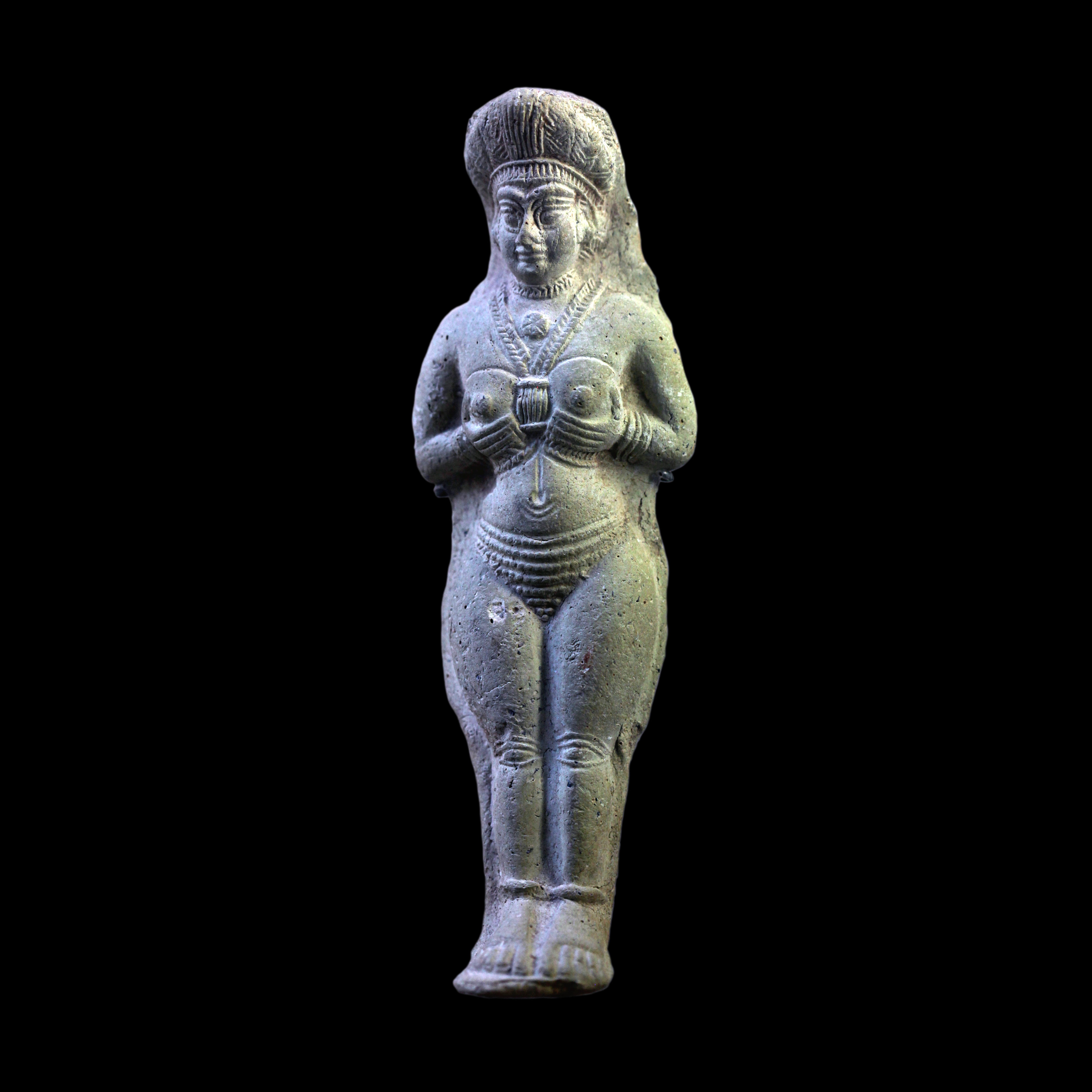
An Elamite figure of a woman cupping her breasts. Louvre.

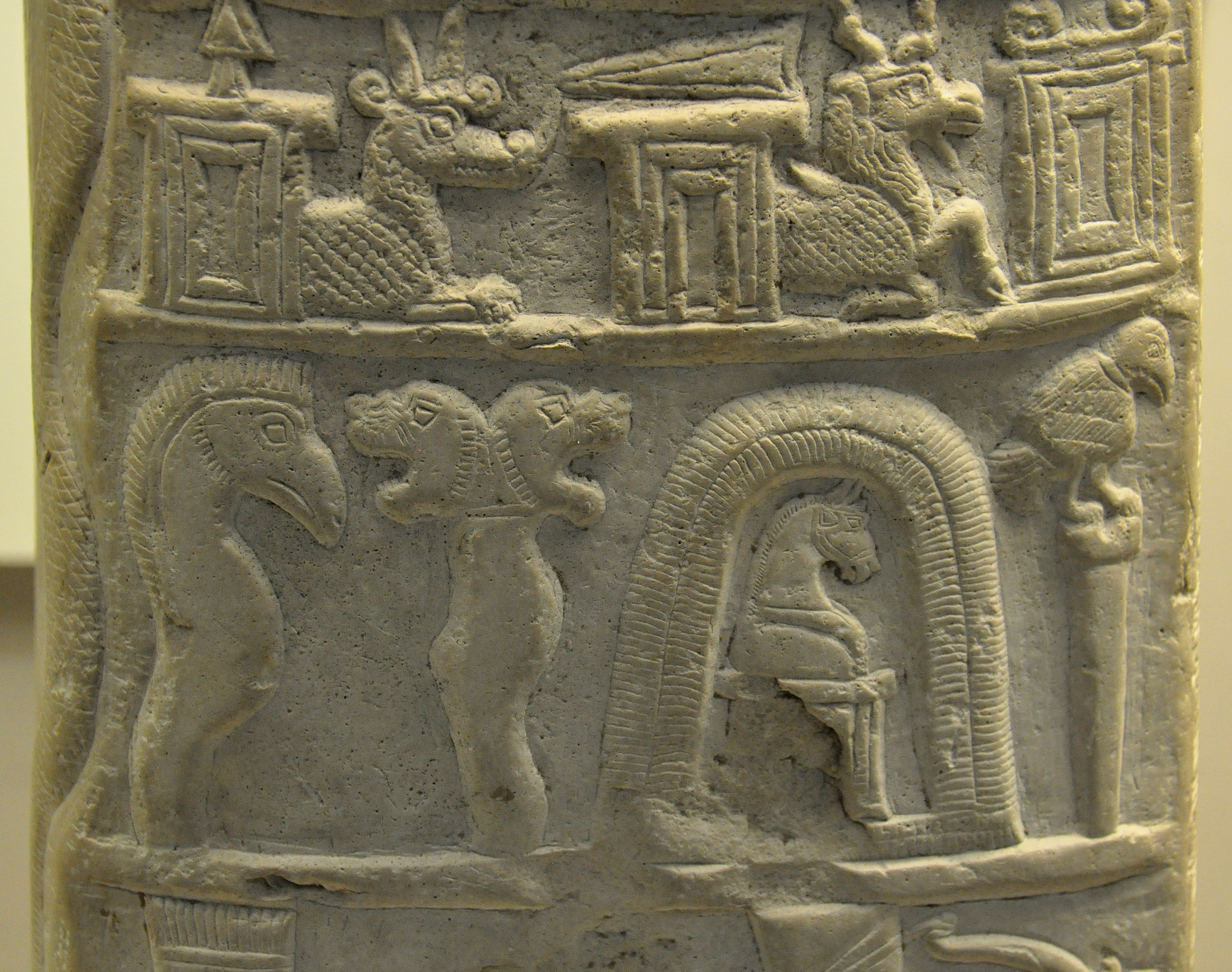
The horse head symbol (bottom row, second from the right) on a kudurru. British Museum.

As a representation of the rainbow, Manzat was a heavenly deity. Her epithets or alternate names attested in Mesopotamian texts include Ningišḫuranna (Sumerian: "lady of regulations of heaven"), Tabanna ("companion of heaven") and Urualšarra ("she who makes the city flourish"), while the Elamite king Hutelutush-Inshushinak addressed her as zana rišarri, "great lady". Based on the last of the Mesopotamian epithets and their shared association with Simut, it is assumed Manzat is the same deity as Belet-ali, "lady of the city", and that she was believed to be responsible for the well-being of cities.

A single text refers to the claws (ri-it-ti) of Manzat.

=== The star Tiranna ===
It is possible Manzat shared her name with a star, ^{mul(d)}TIR.AN.NA, though Wilfred G. Lambert pointed out only the logographic Sumerian writing of the name, rather than the syllabic Akkadian and Elamite one. was used to refer to this celestial body, indicating that the star's name was Tiranna, perhaps meant to be understood as "the Bow Star" rather than "rainbow" in this case. According to Jeremy Black and Anthony Green, who unlike Lambert identify it simply as "Manzat", this star was represented as a horse head surrounded by a so-called "gate" on kudurru. However, Ursula Seid in her study of kudurru iconography concludes the horse head symbol should be connected to an unidentified possibly non-Mesopotamian local deity worshiped by highland communities in the proximity of modern Kirkuk. Tallay Ornan proposes it was a Kassite symbol. Maurits van Loon does propose that "gate" symbols in art represent the rainbow, but he explicitly states that his theory is not linked to Manzat, but rather to the rain goddess Shala. He points out that the temple of Shala and Adad at Chogha Zanbil was adjacent to that of Manzat. He considers it a possibility that figures of naked women cupping their breasts found at this site might represent a weather goddess (Shala or Manzat), and their jewelry - the rainbow.

== Worship ==
Theophoric names attesting the worship of Manzat are known from both Elam and Mesopotamia, examples include Manzat-ili ("Manzat is my god"), Manzat-ummi ("Manzat is my mother"), Danum-Manzat ("Manzat is mighty"), Sha-Manzat ("He of Manzat"), Manzat-rabat ("Manzat is great") and Puzur-Manzat.

=== In Mesopotamia ===
Evidence for the worship of Manzat in Mesopotamia is relatively scarce. The earliest attestation of it are Akkadian personal names from Ur III period Girsu. She was also venerated in Larsa in the Old Babylonian period. Later she was among the deities worshiped in the territory of the First Dynasty of Sealand, where she received offerings during New Year celebrations. In offering lists from this area, she appears alongside Inanna of Larsa, and it is possible that her presence in the Sealand pantheon was the result of continuation of traditions of this city. Only a single theophoric name attesting the worship of Manzat is present in known Sealand documents.

Worship of Manzat is also attested in sources Nippur from between the Old Babylonian and Middle Babylonian periods. A sanctuary dedicated to her was located in that city, though its name is presently unknown. Additional evidence from the Kassite period includes two theophoric names. According to a topographical text, four shrines dedicated to Manzat existed in Babylon. A temple bearing the name E-Tiranna (E.^{d}TIR.AN.NA, "house of the rainbow") existed in Kesh, one of two cult centers of Ninhursag. In the late second or first millennium BCE, Manzat was also worshiped in Der, as attested in a late hymn to Nanaya which lists her among city goddesses and spouses of city gods, alongside the likes of Shala (Karkar), Bau (Kish) and Ishtar (Uruk).

In the Weidner god list, Manzat (Tiranna) appears in the proximity of Šērum, the deification of the red sky at morning, and Mahidanna, the personification of the morning star, believed to be an alternate name of the deity Kabta. In the Nippur god list, she belongs to the group of deities associated with Nisaba. She also appears in a god list known from Mari, though presumed to originate in southern Mesopotamia, in which she is placed between the medicine goddess Nintinugga and Mamu, a dream deity. She and Mamu appear next to each other due to either acrography or homophony of their names. Another western document mentioning her is a variant of the Weidner god list from Emar with a Hurrian column, which explains the theonym Tir-an-na as ka-aš-te, the ordinary Hurrian word for a bow.

=== In Elam ===
In Elam Manzat she appears for the first time in Naram-Sin's treaty with an unknown monarch, though it is commonly assumed that she should be regarded as an Akkadian deity in this case. References to the worship of Manzat are known chiefly from the Elamite lowlands, especially Susa and its surroundings, similarly as in the case of deities such as Lagamal, Pinikir, Adad and Shala. The sites og Deh-e Now and Tappeh Horreeye in particular were closely associated with her, and it is possible she was regarded as the city goddess in these locations. Based on epigraphic evidence it has been proposed that the Elamite city corresponding to modern Deh-e Now was known as Hubshen in antiquity, but Daniel T. Potts notes inscriptions only refer to a land, rather than specifically a city, bearing this name. Elamite king Igi-Halki restored an old kukunnu (Elamite: "high temple") of Manzat in Deh-e Now and left behind an inscription written in Akkadian according to which "Manzat-Ishtar" gave him "kingship over Susa and Anshan". Shutruk-Nahhunte claimed that he repaired a temple in this location built by his predecessors. The same king also built a temple dedicated to her and an enigmatic deity designated by the logogram NIN.DAR(.A) in Tappeh Horreeye, stating in his inscriptions that he hopes the invoked deity (presumably Manzat) will make the land of Hubshen happy. Kutir-Nahhunte likewise renovated a temple of Manzat in Hubshen, presumably the same one as his predecessors.

A further location associated with Manzat was Pi-ša-an-ne, mentioned in a text from Susa. According to inscriptions of kings Shutruk-Nahhunte and Hutelutush-Inshushinak sites of worship of Manzat and Simut treated as a pair existed in Susa itself. Theophoric names invoking her are also attested in texts from Haft Tappeh, which might correspond to ancient Kabnak.

Inscriptions of Untash-Napirisha state that he built a temple of Manzat, referred to with the epithet "lady of the siyan kuk" ("sacred pretinct") in Chogha Zanbil. Belet-ali was worshiped in the same location alongside Simut. A siyan husame (Elamite: "temple in a grove") dedicated to Manzat is also attested, and on this basis it has been argued that such sanctuaries had no funerary function, contrary to a common assumption in scholarship based on the existence of siyan husame dedicated to underworld deities such as Inshushinak and Lagamal.

No attestations of Manzat from Elam are more recent than 1050 BCE, which might indicate that she was no longer worshiped there in the first millennium BCE, or that she only appears under a presently unidentified alternate name.

== Associations with other deities ==
There is some evidence that in Mesopotamia Manzat was viewed as the wife of Ishtaran, the tutelary god of Der. Frans Wiggermann describes the source documenting this tradition as a "late theological text".

In Elamite sources Manzat often appears side by side with Simut, a deity known as "herald of the gods" and associated with the planet Mars, and in Mesopotamia by extension with Nergal. It is a common assumption in scholarship that they were regarded as a couple. In inscriptions from Deh-e Now Manzat appears with the deity NIN.DAR.A, who Daniel T. Potts identifies as a goddess. However, Wouter Henkelman assumes that NIN.DAR.A was male and that perhaps he can be identified with Simut. The name Nindara or Nindar originally belonged to a male Mesopotamian deity, the husband of the goddess Nanshe, who was worshiped in Lagash, Girsu and Ki'esa. It is uncertain if "Nergal of Hubshen" and "Aya of Hubshen" known from Assyrian sources are related to NIN.DAR.A and Manzat, also associated with this location.

In the Mesopotamian god list An = Anum Manzat appears without a husband, though an otherwise unknown son, Lugalgidda, as well as a sukkal (attendant deity), Sililitum, are assigned to her. Only one known copy of the list preserves the lines mentioning these deities, so a degree of textual corruption cannot be ruled out according to Wilfred G. Lambert. Lugalgidda's name is Sumerian, while Sililitum's is likely Semitic in origin. Sililitum was a female deity, as indicated by the label ^{munus}SUKKAL, "female vizier". She shared her name with the tenth month in the local calendar of Susa and according to Lambert with a type of bird (šinūnūtu). The possibility that Sililitum was related to Silili, a deity known exclusively from a single passage in the Epic of Gilgamesh, has been deemed unlikely by Andrew R. George.

Occasionally an association between Manzat and Ishtar is proposed in scholarship, usually based on the fact that ^{(d)}Tir-an-na^{ki} is a late writing of the name of Uruk, but according to Wilfred G. Lambert there is no strong evidence in favor of this theory. While a goddess known from the Old Assyrian trading colony Kanesh, Ištar-ZA-AT, is sometimes interpreted as "Ishtar of the rainbow" or outright as Manzat, it is unlikely that this is the proper reading of the name, and other interpretations, such as "Ishtar-erbat" have also been proposed. According to Daniel T. Potts the occurrence of "Manzat-Ishtar" in the Igi-Halki inscription from Deh-e Now is also not an indication of syncretism, and this name should be understood "the goddess Manzat". The use of ištar or ištarum as a common noun which could refer to any goddess, a synonym of iltum, the feminine form of ilu ("god"), goes back to the Old Babylonian period. To differentiate it from the name Ishtar, it was consistently written without the so-called "divine determinative". An example can be found in the brief description of Išḫara in Atrahasis.

In a single Maqlû incantation, Manzat is described as the sister of the Mesopotamian sun god Shamash, and by extension as daughter of his parents, Ningal and Sin.

In a single Assyrian god list, Manzat's epithets were reassigned to Ninhursag.

Irene Sibbing-Plantholt argues that due to their similar role in international treaties, such as the treaty of Naram-Sin, Manzat can be compared to Ninkarrak.

== See also ==
- Rainbows in mythology
