= Shuwala =

Tutelary goddess of Mardaman

- Goddess associated with the underworld
- Major cult center: Mardaman

Shuwala (Šuwala) was a Hurrian goddess who was regarded as the tutelary deity of Mardaman, a Hurrian city in the north of modern Iraq. She was also worshiped in other Hurrian centers, such as Nuzi and Alalakh, as well as in Ur in Mesopotamia, Hattusa in the Hittite Empire and in the Syrian cities Emar and Ugarit.

An association between her and the goddess Nabarbi is present in many Hurrian documents. It is also assumed that she was an underworld goddess, and she frequently appears alongside other deities of such character, Allani and ^{d}U.GUR, possibly a logographic spelling of the name of Nergal.

== Name ==
Multiple writings of the name are attested: šu-a-la in documents from Ur from the Ur III period, šu-u-wa-a-la, šu-u-wa-la, šu-u-wa-u-la, šu-wa-a-la and šu-wa-la in Hurro-Hittite documents from Hattusa; and ṯwl in a Hurrian text from Ugarit written in the local alphabetic script.

The variety of spelling in the Hittite sources in particular is regarded by researchers such as Marie-Claude Trémouille as evidence that the name did not originate in an Anatolian language. Reference works classify her as Hurrian in origin. However, Piotr Taracha regards her as one of the so-called "Syrian substratum" deities, similar to Išḫara, Kubaba and Astabi.

Identification of Shuwala with Shala, wife of the Mesopotamian weather god Ishkur (Adad), proposed by Edward Lipiński based on the similarity of the names, is regarded as unsubstantiated. The similarity between names of the Hittite god Shuwaliyat and Shuwala is also regarded as accidental due to distinct areas of origin of these two deities. The view that Shuwala was merely an abbreviated form of Shuwaliyat, present in a number of older scholarly publications, is regarded as unsubstantiated.

== Association with other deities ==
Hurro-Hittite ritual texts from Hattusa indicate that Shuwala was regarded as one of the goddesses belonging to the circle of Hebat, which consisted of Hurrian and Syrian deities. She was associated with the goddess Nabarbi in Hurrian sources, though she sometimes occurs in the proximity of the underworld goddess Allani (Allatum), the war god Aštabi, and an otherwise unknown deity named Alḫe as well. In Ugarit, she occurs together with Kumarbi and Nupatik.

It has been proposed that the connection between Shuwala and Nabarbi, which is particularly common in known sources, relied on the accidental similarity between the names of Shuwala and Shuwaliyat, Nabarbi's husband in Hurro-Hittite tradition. However, it is also possible that it indicates both of these goddesses originated in the proximity of the Habur river. Worship of pairs of goddesses (for example Išḫara and Allani, Hutena and Hutellura, Ninatta and Kulitta) as dyads was a common feature of Hurrian religion.

In Emar Shuwala appears in rituals alongside ^{d}U.GUR. ^{d}U.GUR has been interpreted as the logographic writing of either the name of Nergal or Resheph, though it is also possible it is meant to be read as Ugur, as a syllabic spelling of this name is known from Hurrian texts from both Emar and Nuzi. Ugur was in origin a sukkal of Nergal, replaced in this role by Ishum in later periods. In Mesopotamian sources his name was used to logographically represent the name of Nergal from the Middle Babylonian period onward.

== Character and worship ==
Oldest presently known mentions of Shuwala come from documents from Ur from the Ur III period, one of which mentions the staff of temples of this deity, as well as Allatum (Allani) and Annunitum.

Shuwala was the tutelary goddess of Mardaman (modern Bassetki), a city in northern Mesopotamia assumed to be culturally Hurrian based on personal names of its inhabitants (for example Nakdam-atal and Nerish-atal). Shuwala was venerated there especially in the Old Babylonian and Mitanni periods. There is currently no older evidence from the city itself, but it is assumed that her cult had to exist there in earlier periods, as it already had supra-regional importance in the documented times. The city already existed during the reign of Naram-Sin of Akkad.

No evidence regarding the worship of Shuwala postdating the Assyrian conquest of Mardaman is presently available. A temple of the Mesopotamian medicine goddess Gula is attested in the city in documents from the reign of Tukulti-Ninurta I, but it cannot be established whether it replaced a preexisting temple of Shuwala.

While a terracotta relief of a naked woman which most likely had a cultic function, either as part of a ritual or as a depiction of a goddess, has been excavated in Mardaman, there is no evidence that it was a depiction of Shuwala.

Shuwala, directly labeled as "of Mardman," is present in the description of a Hurro-Hittite festival of Shaushka of Tameninga (a city assumed to be located in the upper Euphrates area) found in Hattusa. She was celebrated by cultic performers labeled as "Hurrian singers" in Hittite texts. In offering lists (kaluti) of Hebat and her circle she appears between Nabarbi and Aya. In the Yazılıkaya sanctuary she appears between two unidentified goddesses, the figure representing her is designated as 57 in modern literature.

She was also worshiped in Emar. While no evidence for the existence of a temple dedicated to her in this city is known, she is present in an offering list and two descriptions of rituals, all of them written in Akkadian, even though the goddess is agreed to belong to the Hurrian part of the pantheon of the city. She is mentioned in instructions for the kissu festival of Dagan, which most likely took place in Šatappi, a city possibly located further south. During this celebration, songs dedicated to her and ^{d}U.GUR were sung. The precise meaning of the term kissu remains uncertain, making the nature of these celebrations, and roles of specific deities in them, difficult to ascertain. It has been proposed that the presence of underworld deities - Shuwala and ^{d}U.GUR - indicates that it represented the periodic death and return to life of a deity, possibly Dagan's spouse, but this remains speculative. It is also possible that it involved abi, offering pits connected to the cult of underworld deities.

Shuwala also played a role in the kissu festival of Išḫara and Emar's city god, ^{d}NIN.URTA.

She is attested in Hurrian theophoric names from Alalakh, Nuzi and Chagar Bazar.

== Later relevance ==
In Biblical studies, the term Sheol is sometimes assumed to be a Hebrew derivative of Shuwala's name. According to assyriologist Lluis Feliu, a connection between Sheol and Shuwala is "possible, but not certain." Edward Lipiński regards the connection as proven, but relies on the assumption that Shuwala is one and the same as Allani, which is erroneous, as they appear together as two distinct deities in texts from Ur and Hattusa.
