= Kadashman-Harbe I =

King of Babylon
- Reign: c. 1405 – c. 1388 BC
- Successor: Kurigalzu I
- Died: c. 1388 BC
- Issue: Kurigalzu I

Kadašman-Ḫarbe I, inscribed in cuneiform contemporarily as Ka-da-áš-ma-an-Ḫar-be and meaning “he believes in Ḫarbe (a Kassite god equivalent to Enlil)” (died c. 1388 BC) was the 16th King of the Kassite or 3rd dynasty of Babylon, and the kingdom contemporarily known as Kar-Duniaš, during the late 15th to early 14th century BC. It is now considered possible that he was the contemporary of Tepti Ahar, King of Elam, as preserved in a tablet (Note: Tablet H.T. 38 (472) with seal of Tepti Ahar at the end of the text.) found at Haft Tepe in Iran. This is dated to the “year when the king expelled Kadašman-KUR.GAL,” (Note: The year name reads: “MU EŠŠANA KA-da-aš-ma-an ^{d}KUR.GAL ú-sà-aḫ-ḫi-ru” where KUR.GAL is taken as a metonym for Ḫarbe.) thought by some historians to represent him although this identification (KUR.GAL = Ḫarbe) has been contested. If this name is correctly assigned to him, it would imply previous occupation of, or suzerainty over, Elam.

== His provenance ==
His immediate predecessor may have been Karaindash. He was the father of King Kurigalzu I who succeeded him, as attested by his son in his autobiographical inscription, of which there are two copies, one a hexagonal prism (Note: Prism BM 108982.) and the other a cylinder. (Note: Cylinder NBC 2503.)

Two baked-clay cones (Note: Cones BM 91036 and BM 135743 in the British Museum.) report Kadashman-Enlil I’s honoring a land deed to Enlil-bānī made by Kurigalzu, son of Kadašman-Ḫarbe. A legal text, (Note: Tablet CBS 12914.) dating perhaps to the reign of Nazi-Maruttash, refers to him as the father of Kurigalzu.

== Campaign against the Sutû ==
The most significant event of his reign appears to have been his aggressive campaign against the Sutû, a nomadic people along the middle Euphrates River related to the Arameans, and is described in the Chronicle P, in a somewhat garbled passage which superimposes events relating to the accession of Kurigalzu II, four generations later. He claims to have "annihilated their extensive forces", then constructed fortresses in a mountain region called Ḫiḫi, in the Syrian Desert as security outposts, and “he dug wells and settled people on fertile lands, to strengthen the guard”. These events seem to be confirmed in the opening six lines of text from an unpublished kudurru in the Yale Babylonian Collection, (Note: Kudurru YBC 2242.) which describes his efforts to expel the Suteans from Babylonia.

It has been suggested that the Babylonian work “King of all Habitations”, which is commonly referred to as the Epic of the plague-god Erra, is a Kassite period-piece which includes the description of a raid on Uruk by the Sutû and the subsequent cries for vengeance upon them.

== The canal of Diniktum ==
On a tablet (Note: Tablet Ni. 3199, the earliest known Kassite economic text.) which was found at Nippur, a date “the year [in which] Kadašman-Ḫarbe, the king, dug the canal of Diniktum”, (Note: mu Ka-da-áš-ma-an-Ḫar-be lugal-˹e˺ íd Di-nik-tum ˹mu˺-un-b[al^{?}]) is attested. Diniktum has tentatively been identified as Tell Muhammad. Kadashman-Harbe I’s reign has been identified as the point when literary activity resumed at Nippur after three centuries of silence.
