= Enlil-bānī land grant kudurru =

Ancient Mesopotamian clay stele

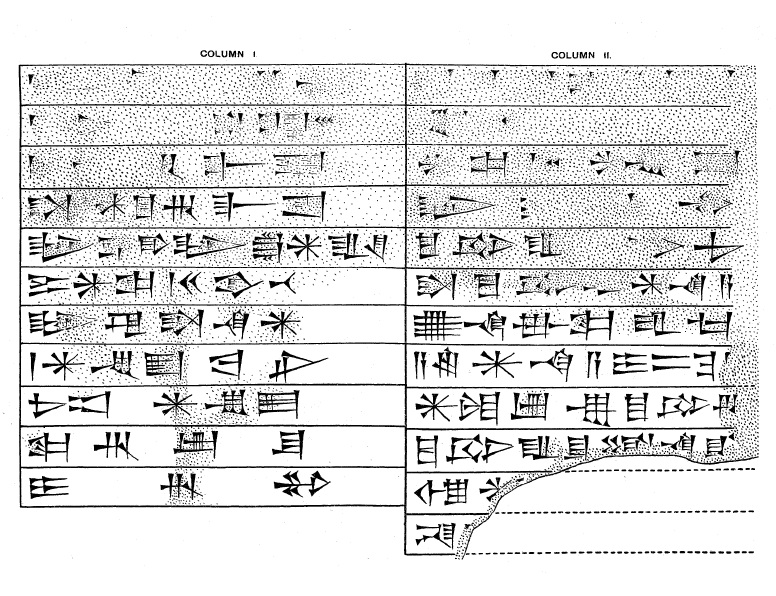
- Land grant to Enlil-bānī nišakku-priest, actually part of a dedicatory cone
- Material: Clay
- Height: 25 cm
- Created: c. 1313 BC
- Discovered: 1883; Iraq

The Enlil-bānī land grant kudurru is an ancient Mesopotamian narû ša ḫaṣbi, or clay stele, recording the confirmation of a beneficial grant of land by Kassite king Kadašman-Enlil I (c. 1374–1360 BC) or Kadašman-Enlil II (1263-1255 BC) to one of his officials. It is actually a terra-cotta cone, extant with a duplicate, the orientation of whose inscription, perpendicular to the direction of the cone, in two columns and with the top facing the point, indicates it was to be erected upright, (on its now eroded base), like other entitlement documents of the period.

== The text ==
Excavated by Hormuzd Rassam on behalf of the British Museum at Abu Habba, ancient Sippar, accessioned in 1883 and given Museum references BM 91036 and BM 135743, the cones stand around 25 cm (9.8 in) in height and have both lost their bases. They commemorate the donation of a sixty GUR field in twenty-three preserved lines on two columns and are without evidence of any of the sculptured religious iconography usually associated with this type of monument.

The donor of the original grant is identified as Kurigalzu I, son of Kadašman-Ḫarbe I. The clay cone memorializes the confirmation of this land grant on Enlil-bānī's son or descendant, possibly his immediate successor to the office of nišakku-priest, Ninurta-nādin-aḫḫē, by Kadašman-Enlil I, the monarch under whom he attained this office, or alternatively a descendant under the later reign of Kadašman-Enlil II. Brinkman considered that there was no compelling reason for either choice. These kings' names are written with the divine determinative: ^{d}ka-daš-man ^{d}en-líl and ^{d}ku-ri-gal-zu, not normally considered a characteristic of Kassite king-names prior to the reign of Kurigalzu II (ca. 1332–1308 BC) although the evidence is scanty. The inscription is important as it was the first to distinguish unambiguously that Kadašman-Ḫarbe and Kadašman-Enlil were two different people and that, although the Kassite deity Ḫarbe was considered equivalent in their pantheon to Enlil, as witnessed on a Kassite-Babylonian vocabulary or synonym list, he was inscribed quite differently.

An individual by the name of Enlil-bānī is known in the genealogy of several people, such as his grandson, Enlil-kidinnī, who would become the prominent šandabakku or governor of Nippur, and a descendant, Ninurta-rēṣušu, who was also to enjoy the post of nišakku-priest during the reign of Nazi-Maruttaš (ca. 1307–1282 BC), where Enlil-bānī is identified as having been the rabânum of KUR.TI, or mayor of the town later known as Dur-Kurigalzu. If this identification is correct, it would favor a dating of the artifact to the reign of Kadašman-Enlil I.

=== Primary publications ===
- Hugo Winckler (1887). "Studien und Beitrage zur babylonisch-assyrisch Geschichte". Zeitschrift für Assyriologie. Walter de Gruyter: 308.
- L. W. King (1912). Babylonian boundary-stones and memorial tablets in the British Museum. British Museum. pp. 3–4. no. I, pl.1e.
- Léon de Meyer, Hermann Gasche and Roland Paepe, ed. (1980). Tell ed-Dēr: sounding at Abū Ḥabbah (Sippar) III, 4. Peeters. pp. 106–107. no.107
- Kathryn E. Slanksi (2003). The Babylonian Entitlement narûs (kudurrus): A study in their form and function. ASOR. pp. 183–190.
