= Akkad (city) =

Ancient Mesopotamian city

Map of the Near East showing the extent of the Akkadian Empire and the general area in which Akkad was located

Akkad (Note: /ˈækæd/; also spelt Accad, Akkade, a-ka₃-de₂^{ki} or Agade, Akkadian: 𒀀𒂵𒉈𒆠 akkadê, also 𒌵𒆠 URI^{KI} in Sumerian during the Ur III period) was the capital of the Akkadian Empire, which was the dominant political force in Mesopotamia during a period of about 150 years in the last third of the 3rd millennium BC.

Its location is unknown. In the early days of research various unidentified mounds were proposed as the location of Akkad. In modern times most of the attention has focused on an area roughly defined by 1) near Eshnunna, 2) near Sippar, 3) not far from Kish and Babylon, 4) near the Tigris River, and 5) not far from the Diyala River – all within roughly 30 kilometers (20 miles) of modern Baghdad in central Iraq. There are also location proposals as far afield as the Mosul area in northern Iraq.

The main goddess of Akkad was Ishtar-Annunitum or ‘Aštar-annunîtum (Warlike Ishtar), though it may have been a different aspect, Istar-Ulmašītum. Her husband Ilaba was also revered. Ishtar and Ilaba were later worshipped at Girsu and possibly Sippar in the Old Babylonian period.

The city is possibly mentioned in the Hebrew Bible (Genesis 10:10) where it is written אַכַּד (ʾAkkaḏ, classically transliterated Accad), in a list of the cities of Nimrod in Sumer (Shinar).

In the early days of Assyriology, it was suggested that the name of Agade is not of Akkadian language origin. Proposals include Sumerian language, Hurrian language or the Lullubian (though that is unattested). The non-Akkadian origin of the city's name would suggest that the site may have been occupied in pre-Sargonic times.

== Sources ==
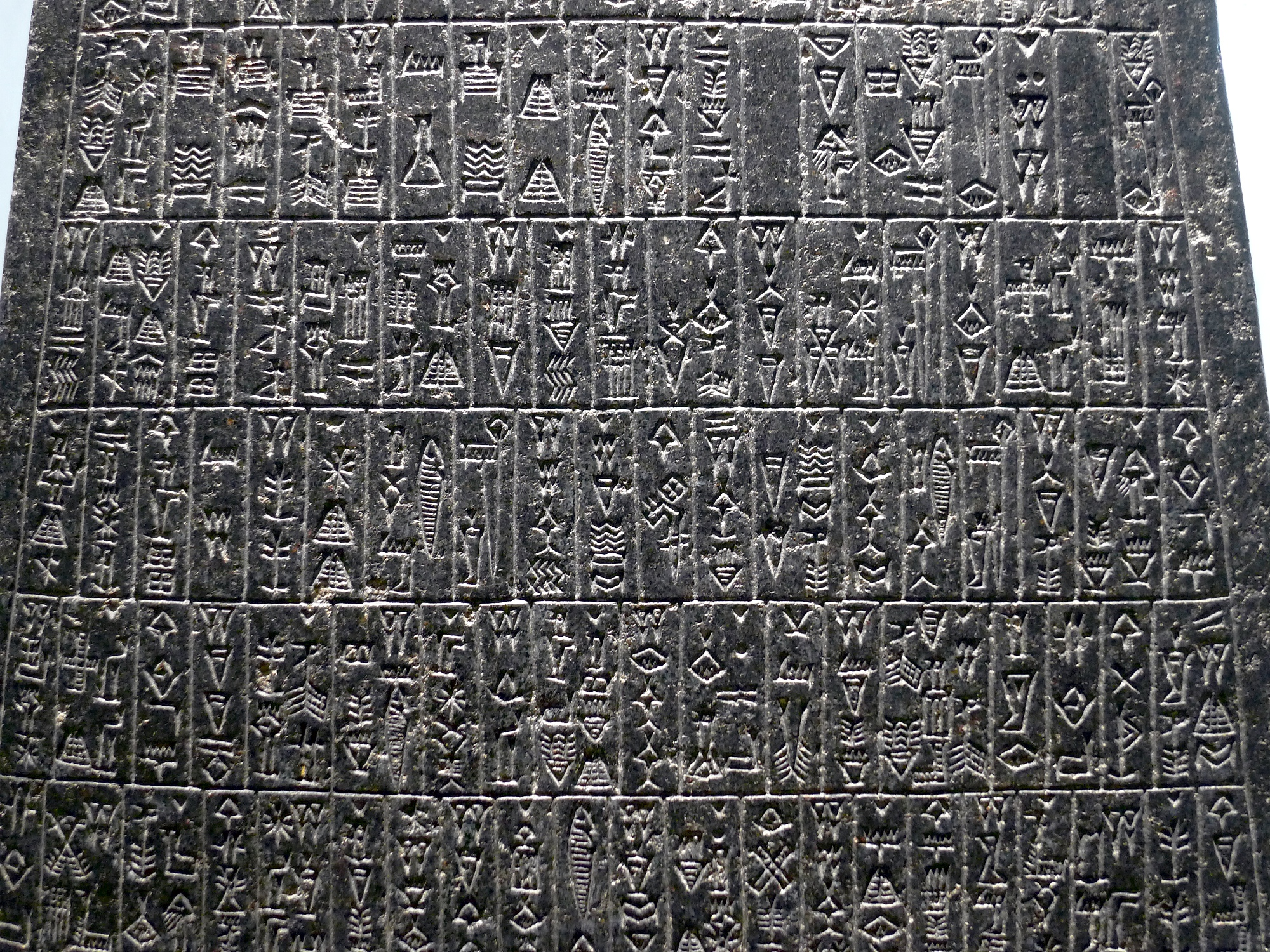
Manishtushu Obelisk, with close-up of the text. 2270–2255 BC, Louvre Museum

A year name of En-šakušuana (c. 2350 BC), named after the king of Uruk and a contemporary of Lugal-zage-si of Umma, was "Year in which En-šakušuana defeated Akkad". This would have been shortly before the rise of the Akkadian Empire and part of his northern campaign that also defeated Kish and Akshak.

A number of fragments of royal statues of Manishtushu (c. 2270–2255 BC), third Akkadian ruler, all bear portions of a "standard inscription". It mentions Agadein this excerpt:

"Man-istusu, king of the world: when he conquered Ansan and Sirihum, had ... ships cross the Lower Sea. ... He quarried the black stone of the mountains across the Lower Sea, loaded (it) on ships, and moored (the ships) at the quay of Agade"

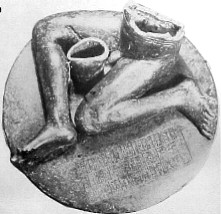
The Bassetki Statue, found in Dohuk Governorate, Iraqi Kurdistan, dated to the reign of Naram-Sin (c. 2254–2218 BC) with an inscription mentioning the construction of a temple in Akkad

The inscription on the Bassetki Statue records that the inhabitants of Akkad built a temple for Naram-Sin after he had crushed a revolt against his rule.

"Naram-Sin, the mighty, king of Agade, when the four quarters together revolted against him, ... In view of the fact that he protected the foundations of his city from danger, (the citizens of his city requested from Astar in Eanna, Enlil in Nippur, Dagan in Tuttul, Ninhursag in Kes, Ea in Eridu, Sin in Ur, Samas in Sippar, (and) Nergal in Kutha, that (Naram-Sin) be (made) the god of their city, and they built within Agade a temple (dedicated) to him. ... "

One year name of Naram-Sin reads "The year the wall of Agade [was built]". Another is "Year in which the temple of Ištar in Agade was built".

The location "Dur(BAD₃)-^{D}A-ga-de₃" (Fortress of Agade) was frequently mentioned in texts of the Ur III period, noting the indication of deification.

It is known from textual sources that the late 19th century BC rulers of Eshnunna performed cultic activities at Akkad.

Based on texts found at Mari, the Amorite king Shamshi-Adad (1808–1776 BC), in the final years of his reign, went to the cities of "Rapiqum and Akkad" (they having been captured earlier by his son Yasmah-Adad) as part of one of his military campaigns, in this case against Eshnunna.

The prologue of the Laws of Hammurabi (circa 1750 BC) includes the phrase "the one who installs Ištar in the temple Eulmaš inside Akkade city". It also holds a list of cities in order along their watercourse ie "... Tutub, Eshnunna, Agade, Ashur, ..." which would place Akkade off the Tigris between Eshnunna and Ashur. Akkade is given the modifier ribitu which is used for prominent places.

Centuries later, an old Babylonian text (purportedly a copy of an original Sargon of Akkad (2334–2279 BC) statue inscription) refers to ships being docked at the quay of Agade, i.e. "Sargon moo[red] the ships of Meluhha Magan, and Tilmun] a[t the quay of] Ag[ade].".

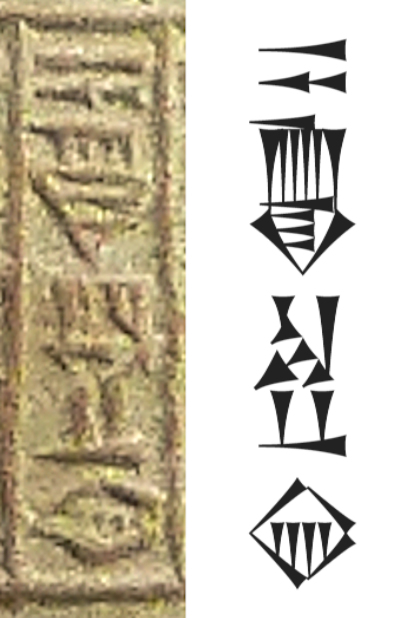
Agade-ki ("Country of Akkad"), on a cylinder seal of Shar-Kali-Sharri.

List of slaves from the Old Babylonian city of Sippar include two female slaves who, based on the standard naming scheme, are either from Akkad or were owned by someone from Akkad, ie "Taram-Agade and Taram-Akkadi". The former was also the name of a daughter of Akkadian ruler Naram-Sin several centuries beforehand.

According to a purported brick inscription copy made during the reign of the Neo-Babylonian ruler Nabonidus (556–539 BC) many centuries later, the Kassite ruler Kurigalzu I (circa 1375 BC) reported rebuilding the Akitu house of Ishtar at Akkade. Another Nabonidus period copy indicates Kurigalzu (unclear if first or second of that name) left an inscription at Akkade recording his fruitless search for the E.ul.mas (temple of Istar-Annunitum). Nabonidus claimed that the Assyrian ruler Esarhaddon (681–669 BC) had rebuilt the E.ul.mas temple of Istar-Annunitum at Agade.

The Elamite ruler Shutruk-Nakhunte (1184 to 1155 BC) conquered part of Mesopotamia, noting that he defeated Sippar. As part of the spoils some millennium-old royal Akkadian statues were taken back to Susa including the Victory Stele of Naram-Sin and a statue of the Akkadian ruler Manishtushu. It is unknown if the statues were taken from Akkad or had been moved to Sippar.

Màr-Issâr (Mar-Istar) was assigned by Neo-Assyrian ruler Esarhaddon (681–669 BC) to the city of Akkad. In one letter from Màr-Issâr to Esarhaddon in 671 BC he reports that the "substitute king", who was the son of the temple administrator (šatammu) of Akkad, left Nineveh and arrived at the city of Akkad five days later and "sat upon the throne" and was buried there. In another letter he states:

"Concerning the lunar éclipsé about which the king, my lord, wrote to me, it was observed in the cities of Akkad, Borsippa and Nippur. What we saw in Akkad corresponded to the other (observations). A bronze ket[tledrum] was set up (played)."

In 674 BC Esarhaddon reports returning the gods (cult statues) of the city of Akkad to that city from Elam, possibly taken by Shutruk-Nakhunte five centuries earlier though more likely taken in an Elamite raid that occurred in 675 BC.

A slave sale document from the 13th year of the Neo-Babylonian ruler Nebuchadnezzar II (605–562 BC) it states:

"Ibna son of Šum-ukin, of his own free will, sold Šahana and her three-year-old daughter Ša-Nana-bani to Šamaš-dannu son of Mušezib-Marduk descendant of the priest of the city of Akkad for one-half mina five shekels of silver, the price agreed upon. ..."

Cyrus the Great (c. 600–530 BC), after conquering Mesopotamia, wrote

"... all of them (kings from the entire world) brought their heavy tribute and kissed my feet in Babylon. From (a region) as far as the city of Assur and the city of Susa, the city of Agade, the land of Esnunna, the town Zamban, the town Me-Turnu, the city of Der, as far as the land of the Gutis, (these) sacred cities across the Tigris ..."

== Location ==
Map showing locations of Sippar, Eshnunna, Kish, and Babylon – cities suggested as close to Akkad

Scholars have worked to identify the location of the city of Akkad since the earliest days of Assyriology. The proposals essentially all fall into two areas 1) near the confluence of the Tigris river and Diayalla river, an area significantly covered by the large modern city of Baghdad, and 2) the confluence of the Tigris river and the Adheim river (later known as the Radānu) south of Samarra.

Almost all of the proposals for the location of the city of Akkad place it on the Tigris river. A problem is that the Tigris, from Samarra south, has shifted its banks over time with its historical course being an open question. This complicates locating the city of Akkad and also opens the possibility that its location shifted over time, as sometimes happened when the Tigris or Euphrates river moved.

It has been proposed, based on kudurrus from the reigns of Kassite ruler Marduk-nadin-ahhe (1095–1078 BC) and Second Dynasty of Isin ruler Nebuchadnezzar I (1121–1100 BC), that Akkad had been renamed sometime in the 2nd millennium. The kudurru suggests the new name was Dur-Sharru-Kin, "on the bank of the river Nish-Gatti in the district of Milikku". This is not to be confused with the Dur-Sharukin built by the Neo-Assyrians in the 8th century BC: the most likely site would be Dur-Rimush (a cult center of the god Adad), nine kilometers (5 miles) north of Dur-Sharukin (Tell el-Mjelaat).

The area of the Little Zab river, which originates in Iran and joins the Tigris just south of Al Zab in the Kurdistan region of Iraq, has also been suggested.

A proposed location of Agade is Ishan Mizyad (Tell Mizyad), a large (1,000 meters by 600 meters; 3000 feet by 2000 feet) low site 5 kilometres (3.1 mi) northwest from Kish and 15 kilometers (10 miles) east-northeast of Babylon. Excavations have shown that the remains at Ishan Mizyad date to the Akkadian period (about 200 Old Akkadian administrative texts were found, mainly lists of workers), Ur III period, Isin-Larsa period, and Neo-Babylonian period, including an archive of cuneiform tablets from the Ur III period. Until Neo-Babylonian times a canal ran from Kish to Mizyad.

On the Kassite Land grant to Marduk-apla-iddina I by Meli-Shipak II (1186–1172 BC) the recipient is given cultivated land in the communal land of the city of Agade located around the settlement of Tamakku adjacent to the Nar Sarri (Canal of the King) in Bīt-Piri’-Amurru, north of the "land of Istar-Agade" and east of Kibati canal.

Based on an Old Babylonian period itinerary from Mari which places Akkade between the cities of Sippar (Sippar and Sippar-Amnanum) and Khafajah (Tutub) on a route to Eshnunna, Akkad would be on the Tigris just downstream of the current city of Baghdad, near the crossing of the Tigris and its tributary Diyala River. Mari documents also indicate that Akkad is sited at a river crossing.

During the reign of Rîm-Anum, ruler of Uruk (c. 1800 BC) prisoners of war from Akkad were grouped with those of Eshnunna and Nērebtum.

An Old Babylonian prisoner record from the time of Rīm-Anum of Uruk in the 18th century BC implies that Akkad is in the area of Eshnunna, in the Diyala Valley north-west of Sumer proper. It has also been suggested that Akkad was under the control of Eshnunna in that period. It is also known that the rulers of Eshnunna continued cult activities in the city of Akkad.

A text from the reign of Zimri-Lim (c. 1775–1761 BC) also suggests a location not far from Eshnunna. After Eshnunna was conquered by Atamrum of Andarig a songstress, Huššutum, was repatriated by Mari and soon reached Agade.

"Gumul-Sin brought the woman out of the city gate and departed. (A report is taken back to my lord.) I gave this instruction to the guides, ‘Until YOU safely guide the woman through a frontier town, modify her garment and head-gear.’ But, being negligent, the men did not modify (the attire) but added three to four (other women) along with her. Having stocked up, they left and reached Agade. They drank beer and, having the woman ride a mule, they led her all the way through the square in Agade. The woman was recognized and she was seized. When news of her capture reached Atamrum in Ešnunna, a troop of 30 men armed with bronze spears surrounded Gumul-Sin saying, ‘Your lord has conveyed to you 5 manas of silver, yet you keep on selling women from Ešnunna."

Tell Muhammad (possibly Diniktum) in the south-eastern suburbs of Baghdad near the confluence of the Diyala River with the Tigris, has been proposed as a candidate for the location of Akkad. No remains datable to the Akkadian Empire period have been found at the site. Excavations found remains dating to the Isin-Larsa, Old Babylonian, and Kassite periods.

A site, locally called El Sanam (or Makan el Sanam), near Qādisiyyah (Kudsia), has been suggested based on the base fragment of an Old Akkadian statue (now in the British Museum) found there. The statue is of black stone and was originally three meters (10 feet) high and thought to be of ruler Rimush. The upper portion of the statue was reportedly destroyed by a local imam for idolatry. The site in question has been partially eroded away by the Tigris and is located between Samarra and the confluence of the Tigiris and ʿAdhaim rivers. The fragment was first observed and described by Claudius Rich in 1821. This location had been suggested much earlier by Lane. More recently this site has been identified in a regional survey (site N) as lying not far south of the site of Samarra on the Tigris river by an old citadel.

In 2022, Japanese researcher Naohiko Kawakami proposed Tell Sinker (also spelled Tell Sinkar), approximately 50 km north of Baghdad near the confluence of the 'Adhaim river, and possibly nearby Ukbara, as potential locations of Akkad. His hypothesis was based on an analysis of cuneiform texts, historical geography, and reconstructions of the ancient course of the Tigris using geographic information systems (GIS).

Màr-Issâr (Mar-Istar), agent of the Neo-Assyrian ruler Esarhaddon in the city of Akkad, was having trouble getting reports to the king. He names some of the post stations between Akkad and Nineveh. None of them are currently known though there have been proposals.

"Along the roadside the (personnel) of the postal stations pass my letters along from one to another (and thus) bring them to the king, my lord. (Yet) for two or three times (already) my letter has been returned from (the postal stations) Kamanate, Ampihapi, and [ ... ]garesu! Let an order sealed with the imperial seal (unqu) be sent to them (that) they should pass my letter along from one to another and bring it to the king, my Lord!"

== See also ==
- Cities of the Ancient Near East
- List of Mesopotamian dynasties
- Chronology of the ancient Near East
- List of kings of Akkad
