= Kurigalzu I =

King of Babylon in the early 1300s BC

King of Babylon
- Reign: c. 1388 – c. 1375 BC
- Predecessor: Kadashman-Harbe I
- Successor: Kadashman-Enlil I
- Died: c. 1375 BC
- Father: Kadashman-Harbe I

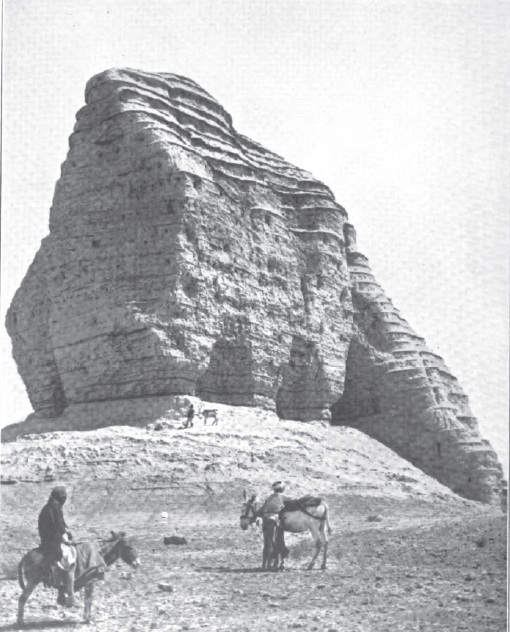
‘Aqar Qūf, ancient Dūr-Kurigalzu (monumental ziggurat remnant, west of Bagdad)

Kurigalzu I (died c. 1375 BC), usually inscribed ku-ri-gal-zu but also sometimes with the ^{m} or ^{d} determinative, the 17th king of the Kassite or 3rd dynasty that ruled over Babylon, was responsible for one of the most extensive and widespread building programs for which evidence has survived in Babylonia. The autobiography of Kurigalzu is one of the inscriptions which record that he was the son of Kadashman-Harbe I. Galzu, whose possible native pronunciation was gal-du or gal-šu, was the name by which the Kassites called themselves and Kurigalzu may mean Shepherd of the Kassites (line 23. Ku-ur-gal-zu = Ri-'-i-bi-ši-i, in a Babylonian name-list).

He was separated from his namesake, Kurigalzu II, by around 45 years and as it was not the custom to assign regnal numbers and they both had lengthy reigns, this makes it exceptionally difficult to distinguish for whom an inscription is intended. The later king is, however, better known for his military campaign against the Assyrians than any building work he may have undertaken. It is now thought, however, that it was he who was the Kurigalzu who conquered Susa and was perhaps instrumental in the ascendancy of the Igehalkid dynasty over Elam, around 1400 BC.

== Conquest of Elam ==
When Ḫur-batila, possibly the successor of Tepti-Ahar to the throne of Elam, began raiding Babylon, he taunted Kurigalzu to do battle with him at Dūr-Šulgi. Kurigalzu I launched a campaign which resulted in the abject defeat and capture of Ḫur-batila, who appears in no other inscriptions. He went on to conquer the eastern lands of Susiana and Elam, recorded in the Chronicle P (Note: Chronicle P (ABC 22), tablet BM 92701, column 3 lines 10 through 19.) out of sequence and credited to his later name-sake. This took his army to the Elamite capital, the city of Susa, which was sacked, celebrated in two inscriptions found there bearing his name. It is thought that he may have installed as his vassal, Igi-Halki, the founder of the new dynasty. A small agate tablet, bored lengthways to make a pendant, is engraved with nine lines of Sumerian on one side, the other side bearing an older dedication of the mother of king Shulgi of Ur to Ninlil:

Kurigalzu, the king of Karduniyas, conquered the palace of the city of Šaša in Elam and gave (this object) for the sake of his life as a gift to Ninlil, his lady.

— Kurigalzu, tablet CBS 8598, University Museum, Philadelphia

The tablet was recovered from Elam during Kurigalzu I's campaign and discovered in a cache of votive inscriptions at Nippur, but was ascribed to Kurigalzu II by earlier historians.

== Diplomacy ==
=== Through correspondence ===
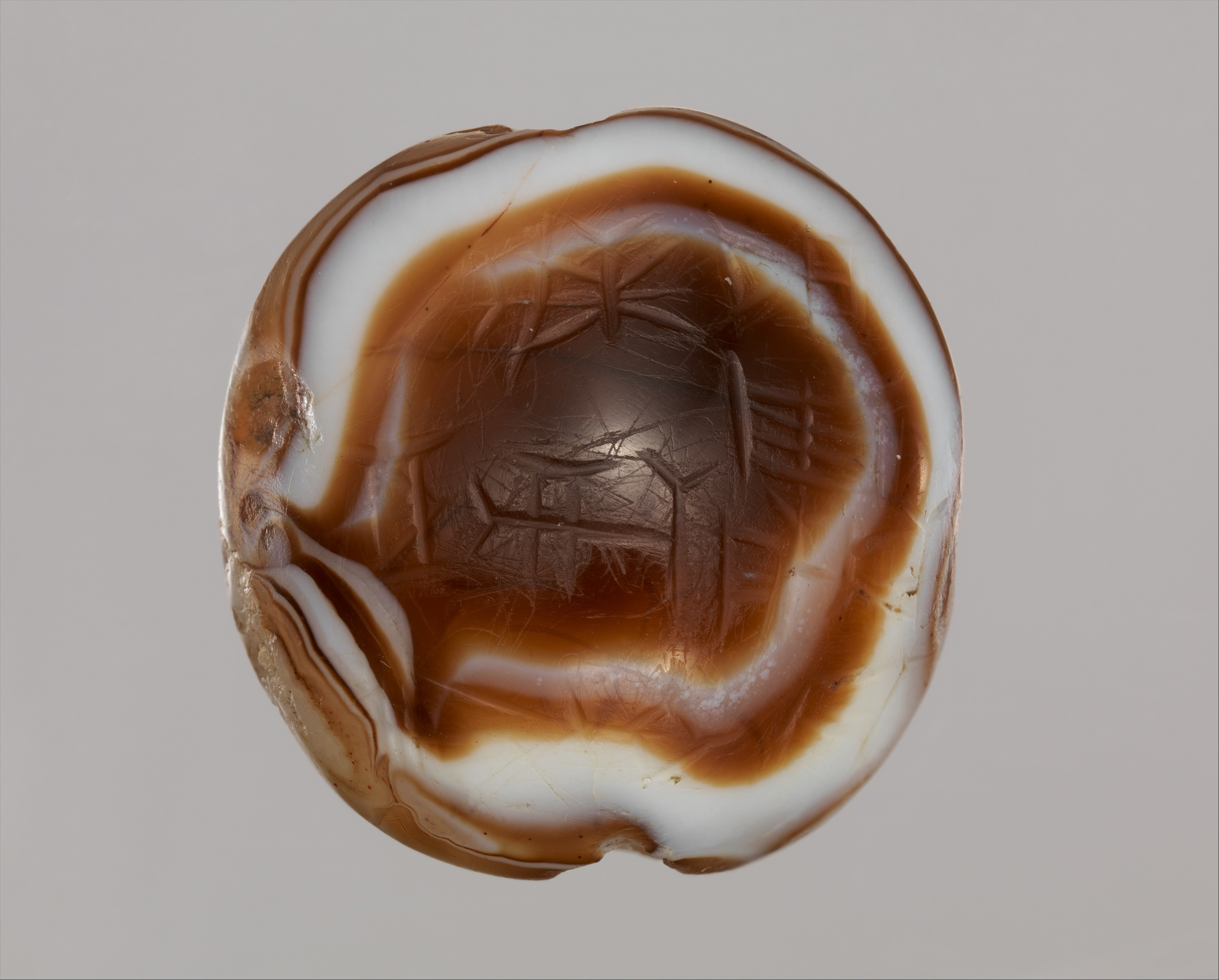
Eye agate bead with cuneiform inscription of Kurigalzu I

Prior diplomatic correspondence is evident, from study of the Amarna letters and includes evidence of dialogue between Thutmose IV and Kurigalzu I as attested to by Amenhotep III in his letter, designated EA 1 (EA for El Amarna), to Kadashman-Enlil I. (Note: Tablet EA 1, “The Pharaoh complains to the Babylonian King,” BM 029784 in the British Museum, CDLI, ORACC Transliteration line 62, “Regarding the words of my father, you wrote...”) Burna-Buriash II reminded Akhenaten in his letter, EA 11, that Kurigalzu had been sent gold by one of his ancestors, (Note: Tablet EA 11, “Proper escort for a betrothed princess,” VAT 151 in the Vorderasiatisches Museum Berlin, CDLI, ORACC Transliteration lines 19 to 20.) and, in EA 9, reminded Tutankhamun that Kurigalzu I had turned down a request from the Canaanites to form an alliance against Egypt. (Note: Tablet EA 9, “Ancient loyalties, new requests,” BM 29785 in the British Museum, London, CDLI, ORACC Transliteration lines 19 to 30.)

=== Through marriage ===
He gave his daughter to Amenhotep III, who was a serial practitioner of diplomatic marriages with two Mitannite princesses and one from Arzawa in his harem, and who would even later go on to wed Kurigalzu I's granddaughter, the daughter of Kadašman-Enlil.

A Neo-Babylonian copy of a literary text which takes the form of a letter, (Note: Tablet VAT 17020, “the Berlin Letter”, CDLI) now located in the Vorderasiatisches Museum in Berlin, is addressed to the Kassite court by an Elamite King and details the genealogy of the Elamite royalty of this period. Apparently, he married his sister to the Elamite king Paḫir-iššan, the son of Ige-Halki, and a daughter to his successor, Ḫumban-numena. This may have been Mishim-ruh, who is cited in royal inscriptions. The princess went on to bear Untash-Napirisha, the next king who subsequently married Burna-Buriaš’ daughter. The author of the letter is thought to be Shutruk-Nahhunte, ca. 1190-1155 BC, who claims descent from Kurigalzu's eldest daughter and also wed the eldest daughter of Meli-Šipak, the 33rd Kassite king. Unfortunately the letter inserts Nabu-apla-iddina “an abomination, son of a Hittite”, into the narrative in the place one might have supposed that Marduk-apla-iddina I was to appear, the substitution of ^{d}AMAR.UTU by ^{d}AG being an unlikely slip of the stylus, making a chronological conundrum and this may be the purpose of the “letter”, to denigrate the later king through the tongue of the earlier one.

== Building works ==
Kurigalzu I's construction efforts are attested to at no less than eleven Babylonian cities. He was responsible for rebuilding the Ningal Temple at Ur, incorporating fragments of the Ur-Nammu Stela in buildings on the ziggurat terrace, the Edublal-Maḫ of Sîn buildings, or “house for hanging up the exalted tablets”, and the building of the gateway.

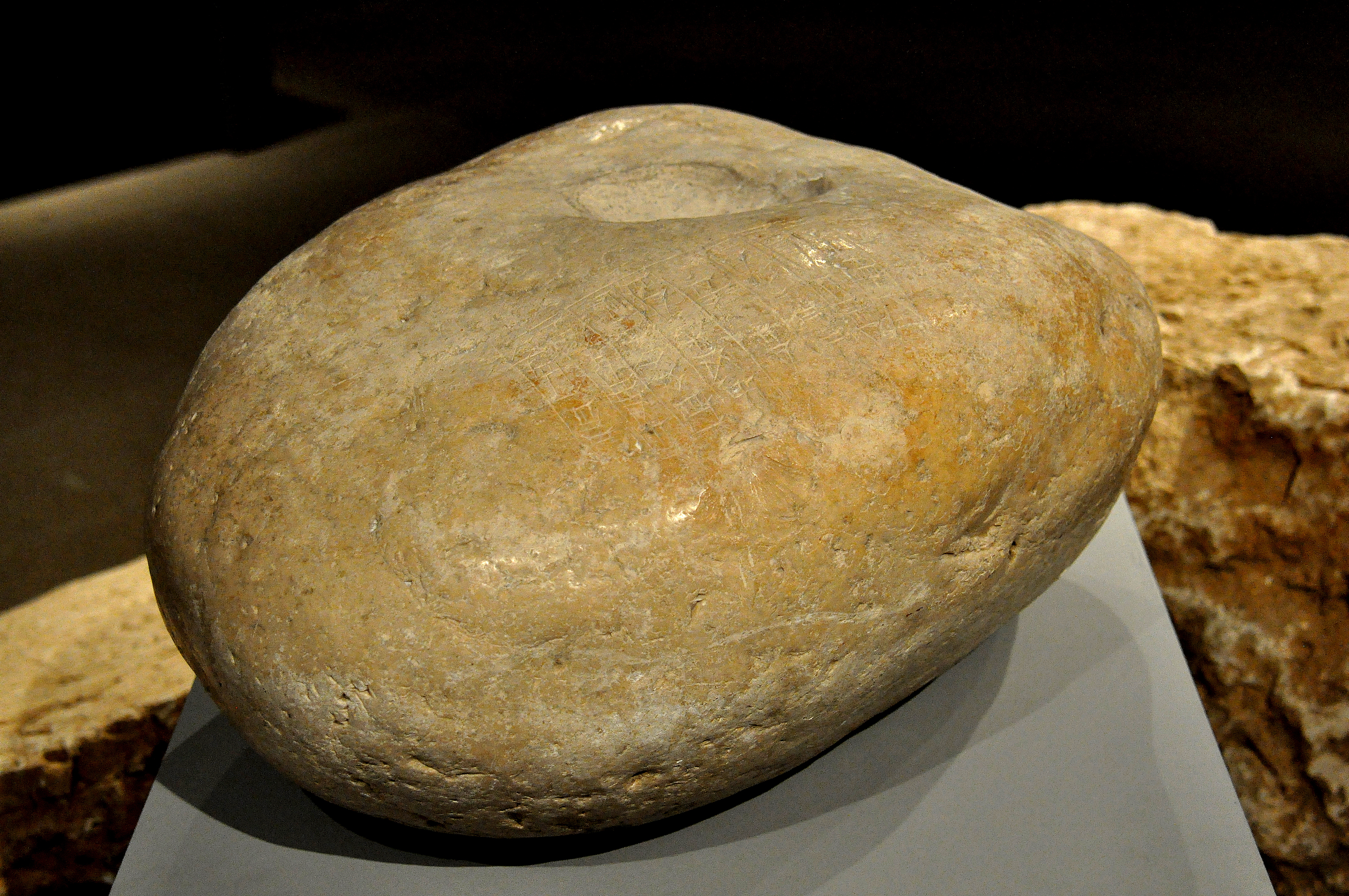
Door socket from Dur-Kurigalzu

He was the first king to build a royal residence bearing his name, a new capital city founded over an older settlement and built around 1390 BC, named Dur-Kurigalzu, or 'fortress of Kurigalzu', in the far north of Babylonia (modern ‘Aqar Qūf). It was positioned to protect an important trade route that led east across the Iranian plateau to Afghanistan, the source of lapis lazuli. The 170-foot-high ziggurat of Enlil can still be seen on the western outskirts of Baghdad, with its reinforcing layers of reed matting and bitumen and the remains of three temples at its foot. Rawlinson first identified the site in 1861 from the brick inscriptions. Excavated in 1942–45 by Seton Lloyd and Taha Baqir, the city covered 225 hectares and included the Egal-kišarra, or “Palace of the Whole World”, a vast palatial and administrative complex.

In an adoption contract which sternly warns the adoptee, “If [Il]i-ippašra says, ‘you are not my father’, they shall shave his head, bind him and sell him for silver,” the date formula used, “in the month of Šabatu, the 19th day, the year Kurigalzu, the king, built the Ekurigibara,” predates that which was introduced during the reign of Kadašman-Enlil I and that had become de rigueur by the later reign of Kurigalzu II. The Ekurigibara of Enlil was a temple in Nippur.

During the excavation of Dur-Kurigalzu 5 fragments of a larger than life size statue were discovered. They contain the longest yet found Kassite Sumerian inscriptions.

== The autobiography of Kurigalzu I ==
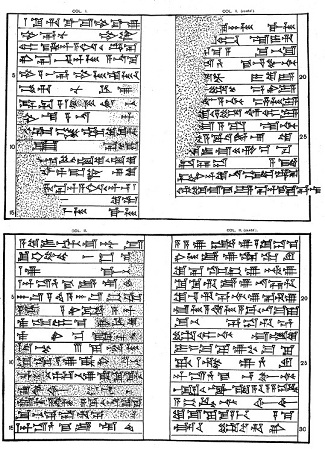
Autobiography of Kurigalzu I

A neo-Babylonian copy of a text recording the endowment by Kurigalzu I, son of Kadašman-Ḫarbe, of a temple of Ištar with an estate situated on the Euphrates near Nippur, is known as the autobiography of Kurigalzu and comes in the form of a small hexagonal prism (Note: Prism BM 108982 in the British Museum, CDLI.) of light-yellow baked clay and a fragmentary cylinder. (Note: Cylinder NBC 2503 in the James B. Nies Collection, Yale University, CDLI.) In it, he takes credit for being the

…finisher of the wall, kišuru, and the one who completed the Ekur, provider for Ur and Uruk, the one that assures the integrity of the rites of Eridu, the constructor of the temple of An and Inanna, the one who ensures the integrity of the Sattukku (food allowance) offerings of the great gods.

— Autobiography of Kurigalzu, Prism BM 108982 and Cylinder NBC 2503

He “caused Anu the father of the great gods to dwell in his exalted sanctuary”, which is suggested to be referring to the restoration of the Anu cult. The text lacks the linguistic features and script characteristics which would bring one to suppose it is a genuine copy of an ancient inscription and was probably created in late Babylonian times to enhance the prestige of the Ištar cult. The extent to which it preserves tradition from the actual events of the reign of Kurigalzu cannot as yet be determined.

== Other sources ==
Kurigalzu I is mentioned in a hieroglyphic inscription on a carnelian cylinder seal that was found in a tomb at Metsamor in the Ararat valley of Armenia, providing evidence for the extent of Kassite influence during his reign. Metsamor was an important Hurrian center for metal forging.

A seal is inscribed nur-[^{d}]-x, son of Kurigalzu, and claims the title NU.ÈŠ [^{d}]en.líl, nišakku-priest, which is shared with others, including three governors of Nippur and other princes. He rewarded an individual with this title in a dedicatory cone known as the Enlil-bānī land grant kudurru. The precise meaning of this title and the identity of the Kurigalzu, I or II, are uncertain.
