= Turukkaeans =

Bronze and Iron Age people of the Zagros Mountains

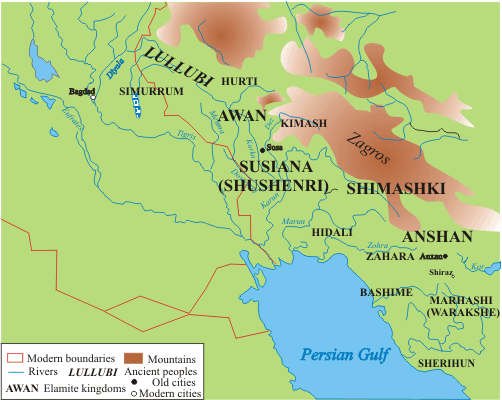
- A map of Mesopotamia and south-western Iran during the 2nd Millennium BCE. The Tukri are generally believed to have been located immediately north of Lullubi (top centre of the map) during this period.

Regions with significant populations
- South of Lake Urmia, Zagros Mountains

Languages
- Hurrian

Related ethnic groups
- Hurrians

The Turukkaeans were a Bronze and Iron Age tribe of Hurrians who lived south of Lake Urmia, in the northwestern Zagros Mountains. Their endonym has sometimes been reconstructed as Tukri.

== History ==
=== Origins ===
The region of Turukkum, which was located south of Lake Urmia in the valleys of the northwestern Zagros mountains, consisted of different kingdoms with a population that was predominantly Hurrian and significantly Semitic. The Turukkaeans have been identified by some scholars as a Hurrian (Note: "His eldest son, Ishme-Dagan, arranged for his grandson, Mut-Ashkur, to marry a daughter of Zaziya, the powerful ruler of the Turukku tribe, a largely Hurrian people who lived east of the Tigris.") or Hurrian-speaking tribe, sometimes commanded by Hurrian military leaders. (Note: "The Mari letters brought to light the Turukkaean tribes, which were perhaps Hurrian or were, at least from time to time, commanded by Hurrian military leaders.)

=== Middle Bronze ===
Turukkum was regarded by the Kingdom of Upper Mesopotamia as a constant threat, during the reign of Amorite Shamshi-Adad I (1813-1782 BCE) and his son and successor Ishme-Dagan I (1781-1750 BCE). The Turukkaeans were allied to the Land of Ahazum, and they gathered at the town of Ikkallum to face the army of Ishme-Dagan, as Shamshi-Adad wrote in a letter to his other son Yasmah-Adad. Ishme-Dagan destroyed the army reporting "Not one man escaped".

The Turukkaeans were reported to have sacked the city of Mardaman, apparently under Hurrian rule, around the year 1769/68 BCE. Babylon's defeat of Turukku was celebrated in the 37th year of Hammurabi's reign (c. 1773 BCE).

A significant early reference to them is an inscription by the Babylonian king Hammurabi, (r. circa 1792 – c. 1752 BCE) that mentions a kingdom named Tukriš (UET I l. 46, iii–iv, 1–4), alongside Gutium, Subartu and another name that is usually reconstructed as Elam. Other texts from the same period refer to the kingdom as Tukru.

=== Iron Age ===
By the early part of the 1st millennium BCE, names such as Turukkum, Turukku and ti-ru-ki-i are being used for the same region. In a broader sense, names such as Turukkaean been used in a generic sense to mean "mountain people" or "highlanders".

Tukru or Turukkum was said to have spanned the north-east edge of Mesopotamia and an adjoining part of the Zagros Mountains. In particular, they were associated with the Lake Urmia basin and the valleys of the north-east Zagros. They were therefore located north of ancient Lullubi, and at least one Neo-Assyrian (9th to 7th centuries BCE) text refers to the whole area and its peoples as "Lullubi-Turukki" (VAT 8006).

== Culture ==
In terms of cultural and linguistic characteristics, little is known about the Tukri. According to Horst Klengel, "The Turukka people evidently belonged to those late-gentile groups in which the primitive social conditions had already decayed and tribal leaders exercised a permanent function due to close contact, partly established through economic pressure, with the state-organized population practicing rain-fed agriculture in the Rania Plain and the Zagros foothills."

== See also ==
- Gutian dynasty of Sumer
- Sumerian King List
- Gutian language

== Bibliography ==
- German Archaeological Institute. Department of Tehran Archaeological releases from Iran, Volume 19, Dietrich Reimer, 1986 (in German)
- Wayne Horowitz, Mesopotamian Cosmic Geography. Winona Lake; Eisenbrauns, 1998.
- Jörgen Laessøe, The Shemshāra Tablets. Copenhagen, 1959.
- Jörgen Laessøe, "The Quest for the Country of *Utûm", Journal of the American Oriental Society, 1968, vol. 88, no. 1, pp. 120–122.
- Eidem, Jesper; Læssøe, Jørgen, eds. (2001). The Shemshara Archives: The letters. Vol. 1. Det Kongelige Danske Videnskabernes Selskab.
- Victor Harold Matthews, Pastoral nomadism in the Mari Kingdom (ca. 1830-1760 B.C.). American Schools of Oriental Research, 1978. ISBN 0897571037
- Peter Pfälzner, Keilschrifttafeln von Bassetki lüften Geheimnis um Königsstadt Mardaman (webpage; German language), University of Tubingen, 2018.
- Daniel T. Potts, Nomadism in Iran: From Antiquity to the Modern Era. Oxford; Oxford University Press, 2014.
