= Shala =

Mesopotamian grain and weather goddess

- Mesopotamian goddess of the weather and grain
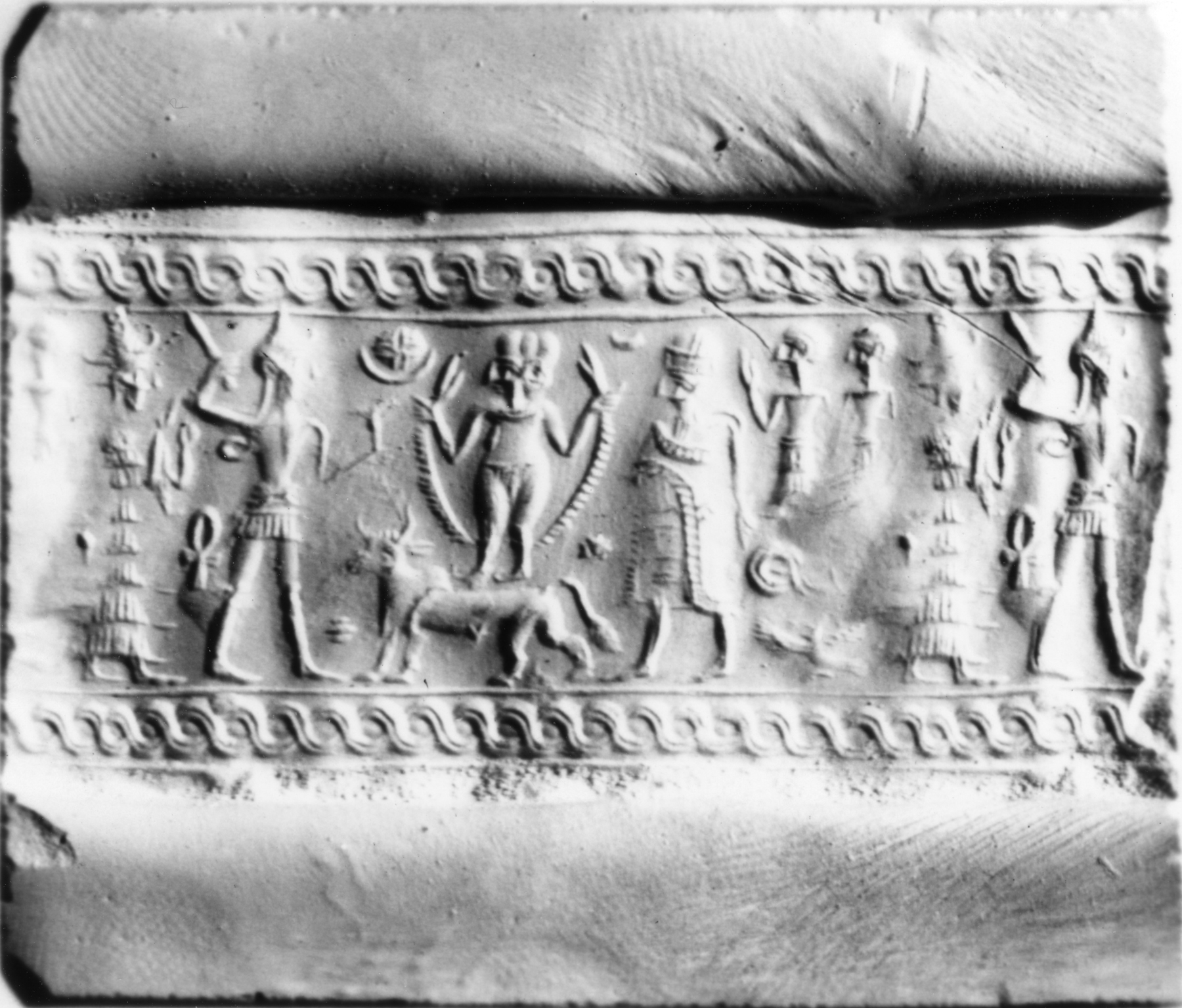
- Impression of a Syrian cylinder seal showing a goddess riding on a bull and spreading her dress. Similar images have been tentatively identified as depictions of Shala.
- Major cult center: Karkar, Zabban
- Symbol: lightning bolts, ear of the corn
- Mount: a lion-dragon chimera or a bull

Genealogy
- Consort: Adad
- Children: Halbinunna, Namashmash, Minunesi, Misharu, Uṣur-amāssu

Equivalents
- Sumerian: Medimsha

Shala (Šala) was a Mesopotamian goddess of weather and grain and the wife of the weather god Adad. It is assumed that she originated in northern Mesopotamia and that her name might have Hurrian origin. She was worshiped especially in Karkar and in Zabban, regarded as cult centers of her husband as well. She is first attested in the Old Babylonian period, but it is possible that an analogous Sumerian goddess, Medimsha, was already the wife of Adad's counterpart Ishkur in earlier times.

Both in a number of relatively late Mesopotamian texts and in modern scholarship she is sometimes conflated or confused with Shalash, a Syrian goddess regarded as the spouse of Dagan.

== Name ==
It is accepted that Shala's name has no plausible Akkadian etymology, and it is possible that it was derived from the Hurrian word šāla, daughter. Researchers attributing Hurrian origin to Shala include Gary Beckman and Daniel Schwemer. A theory regarded as less plausible considers it to be a cognate of the Hebrew word šālah, "to be carefree" or "to be unconcerned." Frans Wiggermann proposes that it had its origin in a Semitic language and that it might mean "well-being."

Sumerian and Akkadian texts spell the name as ^{d}Ša-la. A variant spelling with a long vowel, ^{d}Ša-a-la, is also attested. Logographic spellings of the name are very rare, though one text attests ^{d}ME.DIM.ŠA as a logogram meant to be read as "Shala."

In the god list An = Anum, the alternate names of Shala include Medimsha (Sumerian: "possessing lovely limbs"), Shuzabarku (Sumerian: "she with a shining bronze hand"), Mushmehush, Kinnusum and Enmelulu. Only the first two of these names are attested outside god lists. In one case in a bilingual text Shala appears in the Akkadian version and Shuzabarku in Sumerian. A further name known from bilingual sources is Muhuranki. A balag song from the library of Ashurbanipal lists Minunesi and Shubanuna among her names. The same composition also addresses her by the epithet dumu-é-a, translated as "child of the house" or "daughter of the house," which was also applied to the love goddess Nanaya and to Gunura, daughter of the medicine goddess Ninisina. In a late explanatory text, Shuzabarku is defined as "Shala of wisdom," Medimsha as "Shala of totality," and Shala under her primary name as "Shala of people and dew."

== Associations with other deities ==
Shala's genealogy is unknown. She always appears alongside her husband Adad in known sources, and her character was largely defined by this connection. Texts commonly refer to her as his "great wife" or "beloved wife who gladdens the heart." In a balag song from the library of Ashurbanipal, written in first person, Shala/Medimsha (both names are used in the same text in this case) describes herself as the righteous wife of Adad/Ishkur. Shala and Ishkur are the second most commonly invoked divine couple in cylinder seal inscriptions from Sippar after Aya and Shamash. However, no attestations of Shala are known from the third millennium BCE, and it is assumed she most likely originated in the eastern part of Upper Mesopotamia in the Old Babylonian period. Further west, in Halab (modern Aleppo) and presumably the middle Euphrates area, the wife of the weather god, Hadad, was instead the goddess Hebat. Hebat was also incorporated into Hurrian religion as the wife of his counterpart Teshub. She is absent from later Aramaic sources from the same areas, where the wife of the weather god is also Shala like in Mesopotamia.

Medimsha, treated as an alternate name of Shala in later periods, was initially a different goddess, who appears already in sources from the Fara period though they don't provide any information about her role. Daniel Schwemer suggests that it is not unlikely that she was already viewed as the wife of Ishkur and lack of direct evidence for such a relation between them, known from later god lists, is the result of preservation bias. He additionally proposes that some depictions of a naked rain goddess on cylinder seals might be Medimsha. It has also been proposed that some of such images might represent the Hurrian goddess Shaushka, typically regarded as the sister of Teshub in known sources postdating the pairing of the Hurrian weather god with Syrian Hebat and never labeled as his spouse, though the earlier nature of their relationship is impossible to discern.

The daughters of Shala and Adad were Shubanuna, Namashmash (or Nabarbar; reading of the name is uncertain) and Minunesi. While there is presently no evidence for them ever existing as independent deities outside god lists, according to Frans Wiggermann it is possible that they were depicted in a fashion similar to their mother and shared her functions. In art groups of three Shala-like naked goddesses which he argues can be identified with them tend to be accompanied by a sheep-like mythical creature, most likely of astral character, whose name is presently unknown. The etymology of Namashmash and Minunesi is not known, while Shubanuna's name means "the princely šuba", šuba being a type of unidentified precious stone or shell associated with deities such as Ishtar and Shamash. In one balag song Menunesi and Shubanuna are epithets of Shala rather than her daughters. Namashmash and Shubanuna are also attested in a god list in what is assumed to be an enumeration of epithets of Ishtar or Ishara. Shubanuna might also be attested in the name of a month from the local calendar of Adab from the third millennium BCE. This assumption remains uncertain as she is otherwise absent from the city, while a deified šuba stone (^{d}Šuba) is present in theophoric names from between the Sargonic and Ur III periods, and therefore it would not be impossible for it to also be invoked in a month name.

Further children attested in the sections of god lists dedicated to Shala and Adad include Misharu ("justice;" he could be accompanied by his spouse Išartu, "righteousness") and Uṣur-amāssu ("heed his word"). While Uṣur-amāssu is regarded as a male deity in god lists, there is evidence for the worship of a goddess bearing the same name in Uruk in the first millennium BCE, and in at least one case she is referred to as bukrat Adad, "daughter of Adad."

A further deity belonging to the court of Adad and Shala in god lists was Nimgir ("lightning"), the sukkal of Adad/Ishkur.

It is possible that on at least one seal Shala and Adad are accompanied by Aya, possibly acting as a divine representative of Sippar.

=== Shala and Shalash ===
In modern scholarship, Shala is sometimes confused with Shalash, a similarly named Syrian goddess who was the wife of Dagan. According to Daniel Schwemer, while a degree of confusion between the two goddesses is also present in some ancient sources, it is largely limited to scholarly Mesopotamian texts, and no older than the fourteenth century BCE. According to Lluis Feliu, most evidence for it comes from the first millennium BCE.

In some copies of the god list An = Anum, Shalash is listed as one of the alternate names of Shala. In an explanatory text Ninkusi, glossed as "Shalash," is addressed as "Shala of the western steppe." Ninkusi ("lady of gold") is recognized as a synonym of Shalash, rather than Shala, in An = Anum, where the name appears in the section dedicated to Dagan and his spouse rather than to Adad and Shala. The same god list equates Shalash separately with Ninlil, to match the equation between her husband and Enlil. Additionally, two names are only attested in relation to Shalash, not Shala: Ninudishara ("Mistress who amazes the world") and Ninsuhzagina ("Mistress diadem of lapis lazuli").

In a single copy of a Maqlû ritual from Assur, Shala occurs in place of Shalash, present in other known copies of the same text.

Lluis Felieu rejects the possibility that the two goddesses were originally the same, and especially that the confusion between them was caused by Dagan being a weather god himself and thus analogous to Adad. He also notes that Shala is well attested in art as a goddess associated with the weather, while the character of Shalash, based on parallels with the wives of heads of other pantheons of the ancient Near East (for example Ninlil, wife of Enlil and Athirat, wife of El), would be unlikely to resemble that of the wife of the Mesopotamian weather god. Additionally, the spelling of the name of the goddess paired with Adad in devotional inscriptions is consistent between various time periods and languages, and never ends with a sibilant. Unlike Shala Shalash is also unlikely to have Hurrian origin, as she is attested in the Ebla texts, which predate the arrival of Hurrians in Syria.

There is very little evidence for confusion of the two goddesses in Hurrian and Hittite sources. Daniel Schwemer considers a treaty of king Shattiwaza to be one example. Lluis Felieu proposes that for Hurrians and Hittites the source of confusion might have been the fact the final -š in the name of Shalash name could be interpreted as a case ending in their languages, but he also remarks that the only possible instances might represent scribal mistakes. This reasoning is also accepted by Daniel Schwemer.

Less commonly modern authors also confuse Shala with Shuwala, a Hurrian underworld goddess.

== Iconography and functions ==
Similar to spouses of other deities, Shala was believed to intercede on behalf of human supplicants with her husband.

Like her husband, Shala was a weather deity. She was commonly depicted spreading her dress or naked. Texts frequently highlight her charm and beauty. In art she often holds symbols associated with rain, such as lightning bolts. Sometimes she stands on the back of a bull or lion-dragon chimera pulling her husband's chariot. Such images are known from both Syria and Mesopotamia.

Shala was also a goddess of agricultural produce. Grain was metaphorically regarded as the product of a sexual union between her and Adad, and some artwork depicts romantic scenes between them alongside humans ploughing their fields. An ear of corn was a symbol of her, especially on kudurru. A star associated with her, Šer'u ("Furrow"; identified as one of the stars in the constellation Virgo), was depicted as a woman holding an ear of corn in an astronomical tablet from the Seleucid period. Occasionally birds were also associated with Shala in her agricultural role, and on at least one cylinder seal a bird presumably symbolizing Shala accompanies a lightning bolt representing her husband.

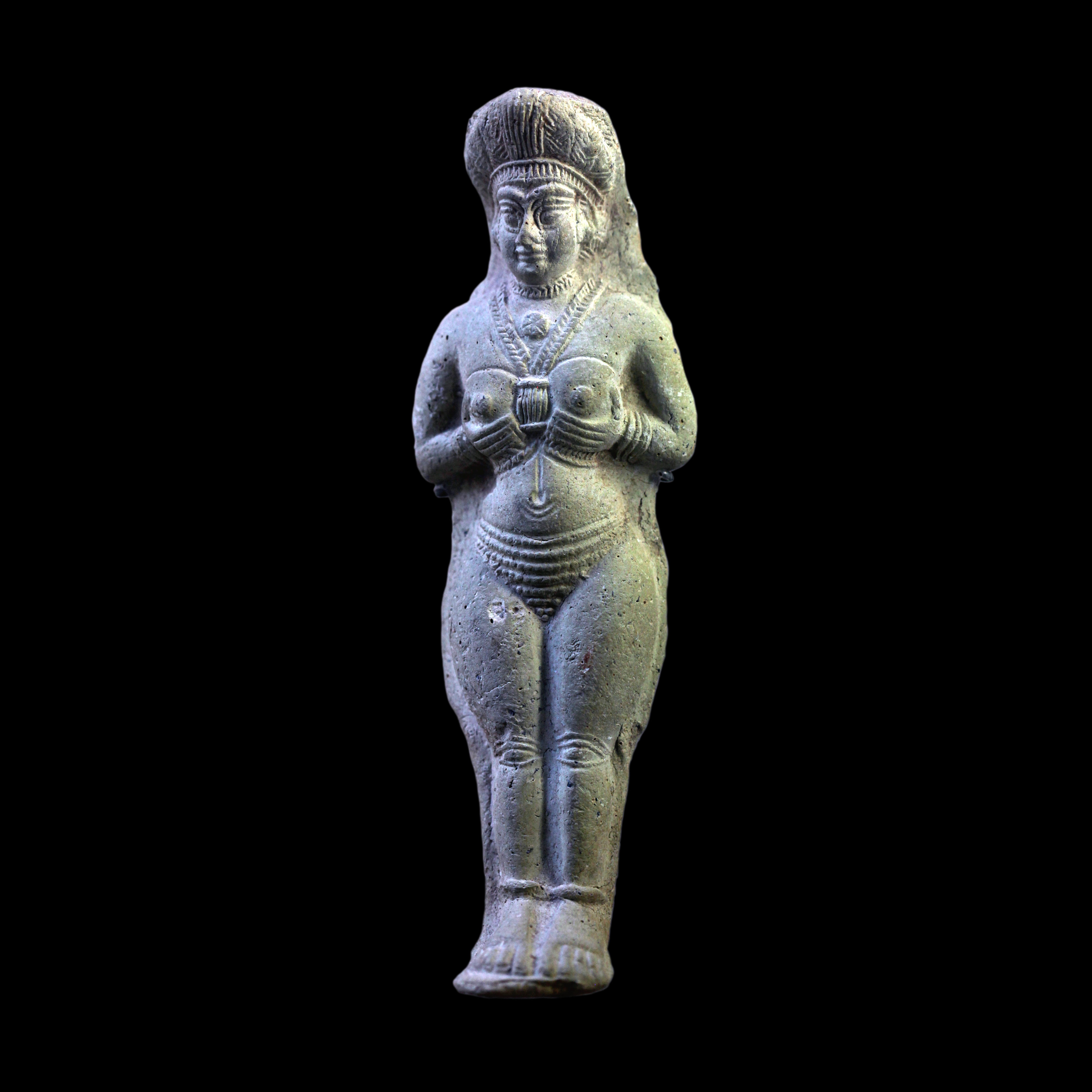
An Elamite figure of a woman cupping her breasts. Louvre.

Maurits van Loon proposes that a "gate" symbol accompanying Adad and Shala on some seals could represent the rainbow, though he notes his theory does not take into account that in Mesopotamian and Elamite pantheons the rainbow was also represented by a separate goddess, Manzat. He points out that the temple of Shala and Adad at Chogha Zanbil was adjacent to that of Manzat. He considers it a possibility that figures of naked women cupping their breasts found at this site might represent a weather goddess (Shala or Manzat), and their jewelry - the rainbow.

== Worship ==
Earliest evidence for the worship of Shala comes from Old Babylonian Nippur, where she appears in offering lists alongside Adad. One of the year names of the Babylonian king Hammurabi indicates that a statue was dedicated to Shala by him. A qadištum priestess of Shala is attested in documents from Sippar.

A hymn to Nanaya which enumerates various goddesses regarded as either city goddesses or wives of city gods mentions Shala in association with Karkar, located close to Umma and Adab. Indirect evidence indicates that it was associated with the cult of her husband's Sumerian counterpart Ishkur as early as in the Uruk period. According to a list of temples, her sanctuary, most likely located in that city, was the Edurku ("house, pure abode"), which might had been a part of Eugalgal ("house of great storms"), a well attested temple of Adad.

The worship of Shala and Adad as a couple is attested in both Assyria and Babylonia in multiple time periods. Shala appears in late Aramaic sources as well, for example in a bilingual inscription from Tell Fekheriye. In the first millennium BCE Zabban was the location of an important temple of Adad and Shala, seemingly connected in some way with Sippar. She was also venerated in Guzana. An Assyrian temple of Adad and Shala was also located in Kalhu according to a document from the reign of Ashurnasirpal II. An inscription of the neo-Assyrian king Sinsharishkun might indicate that Shala was worshiped in the joint temple of Anu and Adad in Assur. Other sites where she was worshiped alongside Adad include Nineveh, Kurba'il, Ekallatu, Urakka, Suhu and Babylon. In Achaemenid and Seleucid Uruk Shala was one of the goddesses accompanying Antu during a parade of deities celebrating the New Year festival.

Multiple theophoric names indicating the worship of Shala are known, with Ipqu-Shala, translated as "friendly hug of Shala" by Daniel Schwemer, being particularly common. Other names, with fewer attestations, include Amat-Shala ("servant of Shala"), Apil-Shala ("son of Shala"), Nur-Shala ("light of Shala"), Sha-Shala-rema ("the actions of Shala are merciful"), Shala-damquat ("Shala is good"), Shala-sharrat ("Shala is a queen"), Shala-ummi ("Shala is my mother"), Shimat-Shala ("fate determined by Shala") and Shu-Shala ("he of Shala"). Some of them are attested west of Mesopotamia, in Mari.

In incantations Shala was invoked against dogs.

=== In Elam ===
Shala was also worshiped in Elam alongside her husband. While names of presumed Elamite weather deities (Kunzibami, Šihhaš and Šennukušu) appear in Mesopotamian god lists, so far none of them were found in Elamite and Akkadian inscriptions from Elam, and it is assumed that Adad (^{d}IM) and his wife were worshiped under their Mesopotamian names and were not merely stand-ins for the names of deities of Elamite origin. They had a joint temple at Chogha Zanbil, referred to with the term silin, for which various translations have been proposed ("rain water," "abundance," "prosperity," "growth"). Like a number of other terms used to describe temples forming the Chogha Zanbil complex it is a hapax legomenon. Most of the evidence for worship of the pair comes from the lowlands (especially Susa). Other deities whose worship is known mostly from that part of Elam include Pinikir, Lagamal and Manzat.

Only the so-called Persepolis Fortification Archive from early Achaemenid times undeniably confirms the spread of Adad's cult further east. It is also possible that a theophoric name attesting the worship of Shala in the highlands is known from Tall-i Malyān (ancient Anshan).

== Later relevance ==
Shala Mons, a mountain on Venus, is named after Shala. Gazetteer of Planetary Nomenclature in the corresponding entry incorrectly identifies her as a "Canaanite" goddess, rather than a Mesopotamian one.
