= Igi-Halki =

King of Elam

Igi-Halki (fl. c. 1400 BC) was a possible king of Elam early in the 14th century BC. In one of his inscriptions, he says that “(the goddess) Manzat-Ishtar granted him the kingship of Susa and Anzan...”. The absence of ancestor kings in this inscription made scholars suggest that he started a new dynasty in Elam, usually called Igihalkids. Igi-Halki might have been installed by a Babylonian king Kurigalzu I, who conquered Susa around that time. He is also mentioned as the father of king Attar-kittah on two mace heads found in Chogha Zanbil, and in the inscription of king Shilhak-Inshushinak as the father of kings Pahir-ishan and Attar-Kittah.
