= Inshushinak-shar-ili =

King of Elam
- Reign: c. 1400 BC
- Predecessor: Tepti-Ahar

Inshushinak-shar-ili, or -ilani (Elamite: Inshushinak-sunkir-nappipir; fl. c. 1400 BC) was an Elamite king. He belonged to the loose periodization of kings called the Kidinuid dynasty, during the early Middle Elamite Period.

== Attestations ==
Inshushinak-shar-ili is attested by inscriptions on about two dozen bricks from the ancient Elamite capital of Susa, which detail that Inshushinak-shar-ili restored buildings at the Inshushinak Temple in that very city, which were built by a former sukkalmah, named Temti-Halki.

This king is also attested by the seal of an official named Adad-erish, head of the squires, who calls himself "Adad-erish servant of Inshushinak-shar-ilani, king of Susa, servant of Adad."
