= Bassetki =

Bassetki Arabic: باستكي Mardaman?
- Location within Iraqi Kurdistan
- Coordinates: 36°57′31.6″N 42°43′17.4″E
- Country: Iraq
- Governorate: Dohuk Governorate
- Districts: Simele District

Bassetki (Kurdish: باستکێ, romanized: Bassetkî) is a small village in Iraq, in Dohuk Governorate of autonomous Kurdistan Region. The village is associated with several archaeological finds.

== History ==
The site was occupied in the Early Bronze, Middle Bronze, Mittani, Middle Assyrian, Neo-Assyrian, Hellenistic, Islamic, and Modern periods. It may be the ancient city of Mardaman.

== Archaeology ==
In 1975 a fragment of a figure of Naram-Sin of Akkad, known as Bassetki Statue, was discovered near Bassetki. The statue was stolen from the National Museum of Iraq during the Iraq War, but was later retrieved by US soldiers.

Since 2016, archaeological excavations have been conducted in Bassetki by the Institute for Ancient Near Eastern Studies team from the University of Tübingen and Hasan Qasim from the Directorate of Antiquities in Dohuk. They revealed a large Bronze Age city established in c. 3000 BC which flourished for more than 1,200 years. From c. 2700 BC the city had a wall protecting the upper part of the city from invaders. The city had an extensive road network, several residential districts and a palatial building. A contemporary cemetery was located outside the city. The city was connected to other regions of Mesopotamia and Anatolia by an overland roadway dating from c. 1800 BC. The archeologists also discovered settlement layers dating from the Akkadian Empire, which also encompassed the territory of modern Iraq. The finds were announced by the University of Tübingen on 3 November 2016.

In the summer of 2017, archaeologists from the University of Tübingen in Germany uncovered, on the eastern slope (Area C), a collection of 3,200 year-old cuneiform tablets hidden inside a collection of ceramic jugs. These tablets reveal the location of the ancient lost royal city of Mardaman that may have once stood where Bassetki lies today. The tablets date back to c. 1250 BC when the area was part of the Middle Assyrian Empire. In the same room of the governor's building a number of Faience objects were found including bowls, ornaments, and tokens. Faience was apparently both produced and stored in the room.

Excavation continued in 2018 and 2019.

=== Muqable ===
Excavations at the nearby site of Muqable, 5 kilometers southeast of Bassetki, have revealed a Middle Assyrian rural building complex.

== See also ==
- Cities of the ancient Near East
