= Karkar (ancient city) =

Lost ancient city in Iraq

Karkar was an ancient Mesopotamian city in present-day Iraq. Its exact location is unknown (candidate Tell Ĝidr), though based on textual sources it is known that it is to be sought on the Tigris, between Adab and Zabalam. Identification with the archeological site Tell Ĝidr has been proposed, though it is not universally accepted.

== Name ==
While in addition to Karkar forms Karkara, Kakra and Kakru are also attested, the first spelling is considered conventional. In cuneiform the name was written as kar-kar^{ki}(𒋼𒀀𒋼𒀀𒆠). A logographic writing, IM^{ki} (𒅎𒆠), is also attested. The oldest attestations of the name, dated to the Uruk period, use the logogram as opposed to a phonetic writing, though at the time the sign had the form of NI_{2} (sign 396 in the modern classification of archaic cuneiform), as opposed to IM (sign 264). The same logogram, if instead written with the determinative dingir, designated the god Ishkur, who was associated with Karkar, which lead Dietz Otto Edzard to compare this scribal convention to the use of the logogram EN.LÍL^{ki} to represent Nippur, the cult center of Enlil. However, not every instance of IM^{ki} can be interpreted as a reference to Karkar, as the same logogram could also be used to render the names of two other cities: Enegi, the cult center of Ninazu, and Muru, the cult center of Ninkilim. In these two cases the reasoning behind the use of this logogram is unknown.

== Location ==
The exact location of Karkar remains unknown. Based on textual sources it is known it was located on the Tigris, between Adab and Zabalam. Identification with Tell Ĝidr, an archeological site also located on the Tigris, some twenty kilometers to the southeast of Kisurra, has been proposed. It has alternatively been suggested that it should be identified as Dabrum, though Marvin A. Powell has argued against this possibility, as the latter city is only mentioned in sources from the Ur III period and years immediately preceding it, while Tell Ĝidr might have been inhabited as early as in the Jemdat Nasr and Uruk periods, with oldest certainly dated evidence coming from Ubaid III period. It continued to be inhabited up to the Kassite period, and then again in Parthian times, which according to Powell supports the possibility that habitation continued through the entire period during which cuneiform was in use in modern Iraq, even though evidence from Neo-Babylonian and Achaemenid times is lacking. A text mentions a land shipment from Umma to Karkar which took one days travel.

- Ur III period. Karkar is within the region of Umma, about 1 day (c. 16-20 km radius) away in shipment time.
- Isin-Larsa period. Ishbi-Erra of Isin seizes control over Umma and other major cities, including the Karkar temple district.
- Isin-Larsa period. Iddin-Dagan of Isin sets up a monument at the temple.
- Isin-Larsa period. Rim-Sin of Larsa appoints the high priestess of the temple.
- Babylonian period. Hammurabi gains control over Isin-Larsa, including Karkar, mentioning the city in his Code of Laws.

== History ==
Karkar was settled from the Uruk period to the Kassite period.

=== Early Bronze Age ===
==== Uruk and Jemdet Nasr periods ====
Chalcolithic/Early Bronze IIA. Karkar is already attested in sources from the Uruk period. The city served as a cult center of the Mesopotamian weather god. It served as a cult center of the weather god Ishkur.

==== Early Dynastic I-III ====
Early Bronze IIB-IIIB (c. 2850/2750-2350 BCE). No available data.

==== Akkadian period ====
Early Bronze IVA (c. 2350-2150 BCE). In the Akkadian period (c. 2334-2154 BCE), the deity became known under the Akkadian name Adad, and a temple dedicated to him located there is well attested.

==== Utu-Hengal and Ur III period ====
Early Bronze IVB (c. 2150-2020/2000 BCE). The city is listed in the campaign itinerary of Uruk ruler Utu-hengal (r. 2119-2112 BCE) against the Gutian ruler Tirigan. The campaign left Uruk, passed through Nagsu and then proceeded on the Karkar.

"After he (Utu-hegal) departed (from) the temple of the god Iskur, on the fourth day he set up ... in the city of Nagsu on the Iturungal canal. On the fifth day he set up ... in the shrine III-tappe. He captured Ur-Ninazu (and) Nabi-Enlil, generals whom he (Tirigan) had sent as envoys to the land of Sumer, (and) put handcuffs on them. After he departed (from) the shrine III-tappe, on the sixth day he set up ... at Karkar. He proceeded to the god Iskur (and) prayed to him"

While originally referred to with the Sumerian name Ishkur, by the Ur III period he came to be fully fused with Adad, who was already associated with him at least by scribes in pre-Sargonic Mari. He could be referred to with the epithet Lugal-Karkar or Lugal-Karkarra, “lord of Karkar”. He was also the main deity of the local pantheon. In addition to Ishkur, his wife Shala was also worshiped in Karkar. A temple dedicated to the weather god existed in the city. It bore the ceremonial name Eugalgal (also spelled Eugalgalla), “House of Great Storms”. In the Temple Hymns the same sanctuary is referred to as Eugalgim, “House Like a Great Storm”. Both names occur in the Canonical Temple List, respectively in lines 295 and 297. It is also possible that Edurku, “House, Pure Abode”, a sanctuary of Shala attested in a lipšur litany, was similarly located in Karkar and formed a part of the Eugalgal.

The oldest reference to the cult of the weather god in Karkar occurs in a text known from three copies from the Old Babylonian period, but presumably originally composed in the late third millennium BCE, according to which king Utu-hegal of Uruk prayed to him in this city to gain his support in an upcoming battle during his campaign against the Gutians. While a temple hymn focused on the sanctuary is known too, and was traditionally associated with Enheduanna, it cannot be dated precisely. Additionally, as argued by Daniel Schwemer, some of the early sources from Adab presumably mention religious officials from Karkar. He highlights the existence Sargonic administrative texts dealing with rations meant for the ereš-dingir (entum) priestess and sanga (šangûm) priest of Ishkur as possible examples.

Sources pertaining to Karkar from the Ur III period are also available. The city was considered a major religious site, and offerings to the temple of Ishkur were provided not only from a center of royal administration, Puzrish-Dagan, but also from Girsu and Umma, as documented in texts from the reign of Shu-Sin. A single reference to a transaction concerning goods meant for this sanctuary occurs in the text corpus from Nippur as well. Additionally, a year name of an unspecified king from the Third Dynasty of Ur, according to Douglas Frayne Ur-Nammu, though Shulgi has also been suggested, which mentions the appointment of a priestess of Ishkur who was “chosen by omens” might also be related to the traditions of Karkar.

=== Middle Bronze Age ===
==== Isin-Larsa period ====
In the Isin-Larsa period (c. 2020/2004-1763 BCE), the first king of the Isin dynasty, Ishbi-Erra (r. c. 2017–1985 BCE), seized control of Umma shortly after the collapse of the Third Dynasty of Ur. According to historical inscriptions, Ishbi-Erra's expansion from Isin included the capture of several major cities, specifically Nippur, Umma, Girsu, and Puzrish-Dagan. Iddin-Dagan of Isin (r. 1975-1954 BCE) mentions Karkar in a year-name stating: "Year Iddin-Dagan made a throne dais for Iszkur of Karkar^{ki}."

The Larsa king Sumuel (c. 1895-1866 BCE) explicitly claims to have defeated the army of Isin and destroyed Umma. In the same period, he boasts of conquering Kish and Akusum, indicating a total sweep of the central and eastern plains, indicating Karkar was now part of Larsa. Rim-Sin I of Larsa (r. 1822-1763 BCE) appears to have controlled the city, and in his 12th year name, he records the appointment of a high priestess (entum) of Adad in Karkar. Additional attestations from the period of the latter ruler's reign include a reference to a daughter of this king being the current high priestess of Adad in Karkar, an administrative text from Larsa mentioning a herd of sheep owned by said god, and two passages in texts from Nippur which reference allotments to a certain Adad-ešar, who acted on behalf of said priestess from Karkar.

==== Babylonian period ====
Karkar and its temple are documented in sources from the Old Babylonian period. When Hammurabi defeated Rim-Sin I in 1763 BCE, Karkar was absorbed into the growing Babylonian Empire. The name Bit Karkar (House/District of Karkar) appears in the Prologue to the Code of Hammurabi, royal inscriptions, and contemporary administrative letters. Hammurabi (r. 1792-1750 BCE) identifies himself as the "Prince who makes the face of Adad shine in Karkar" and the "One who restored the E-udgalgal" (the temple of Adad) in the heart of the city. By restoring the temple he was both pious and asserted control over the home of the storm god, important for a society where rain and flood was an expression of divine power. A reference to “Adad of Karkar” also occurs in the prologue of the Laws of Hammurabi in an enumeration of the main deities of Babylonia. The name of the city could also be used as an element of personal names, according to Daniel Schwmer as a stand-in for the name of its main deity.

=== Late Bronze Age ===
==== Kassite period ====
It is not certain if Karkar remained a major urban center after the Old Babylonian period, and the possibility that it was gradually abandoned has been suggested. No non-literary references to it have been identified in sources from later periods. An exception is the name of a certain Rīš-Karkara, “Karkar is acclaimed”,) identified in a Middle Babylonian text. Karkar might also be attested under the logographic spelling of its name in the list of ziggurat and city wall names from Nineveh (final section of the text K 4337), most likely originally composed in the Kassite period. It mentions a ziggurat located in this city, Earattakišarra (é-aratta^{ki}-ki–šár-ra; according to Andrew R. George’s translation “House, Mountain/Noblest of the Universe”). Another text, a list of temples, also mentions a ziggurat in IM^{ki}, presumably also to be understood as Karkar in this context, but states it was known as Eudegalanna (“House, Great Wonder of Heaven”).

In a fragmentary literary text of the Old Babylonian (or possibly following Kassite) era there is a reference to an uprising by troops that "deposed four kings" at Karkar.

== See also ==
- Cities of the ancient Near East
- Tell Jidr
