= Haft Tepe =

- Kabnak
- Location within Iran
- 32°04′44″N 48°19′35″E
- Type: Settlement
- Cultures: Elamite
- Location: Khuzestan Province, Iran

Site notes
- Excavation dates: 1908, 1965-1979, 2003-2013
- Archaeologists: Jacques de Morgan, Ezzat Negahban, Behzad Mofidi
- Condition: In ruins

Haft Tepe (also Haft Tape) is an archaeological site situated in the Khuzestan Province in south-western Iran, about 15 kilometers southwest of the ancient city of Susa. At this site the possible remains of the Elamite city of Kabnak were discovered in 1908, and excavations are still carried out.

== History ==
The city of Kabnak is mentioned as an important political centre during the reign of the Elamite king Tepti-Ahar, the last king of the Kidinuid dynasty ruling in the 15th century BC. He may also have been buried in the city. Another ruler known from two seals found in a grave at Haft Tepe was Inshushinak-sarru-(rabu)-ilani. After the death of Tepti-Ahar the center of power returned to the old capital Susa, although there is no clear evidence that Kabnak ever held real power at all. Due to the turmoil of this era it is possible the construction of Kabnak was necessary after Tepti-Ahar lost control over Susa, however this theory has not been completely confirmed by solid proof. Some centuries later another city was built at the nearby site of Choqa Zanbil.

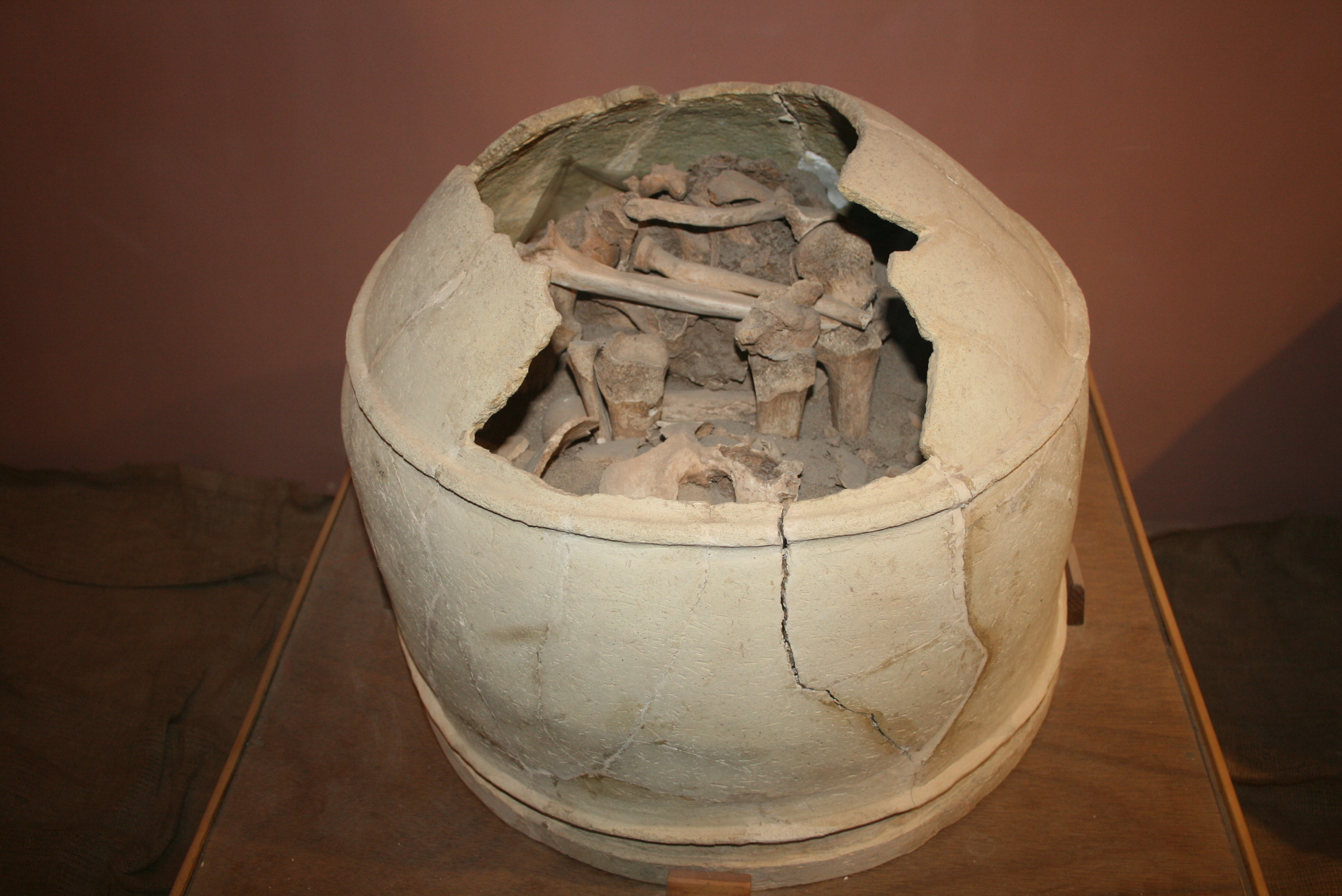
Elamite burial container in Heft Tepe museum

Excavations at Haft Tepe revealed a large funerary complex founded by Tepti-Ahar where the god Kirwashir (Kirmasir) was worshiped. It had two large mud-brick platforms, a workshop area and a probable palace. Beneath a large rectangular courtyard lay a subterranean funerary complex intended for the king and his family. The two tombs, including that of the king, featured an oval vaulted roof, built of baked brick with gypsum mortar. The tomb of Tepti-Ahar measured 10 meters in length, 3.25 meters in width, and 3.75 meters in height. Skeletal remains were found in the tomb, though it is not certain they belong to royalty. Another large structure found at the site was perhaps the foundations of a ziggurat, along with courtyards and suites of rooms. The funerary complex was decorated with bronze plates and wall paintings. Several examples of terracotta sarcophagi generally called "bathtub coffins" were found. Also found were several large stone stele one of which, written in contemporary Babylonian, detailed the funerary rites and duties including sacrifices to be made before the chariot of the god and of Tepti-Ahar. Administrative texts belonging to the reign of Tepti-Ahar were also found at the site.

== Archaeology ==
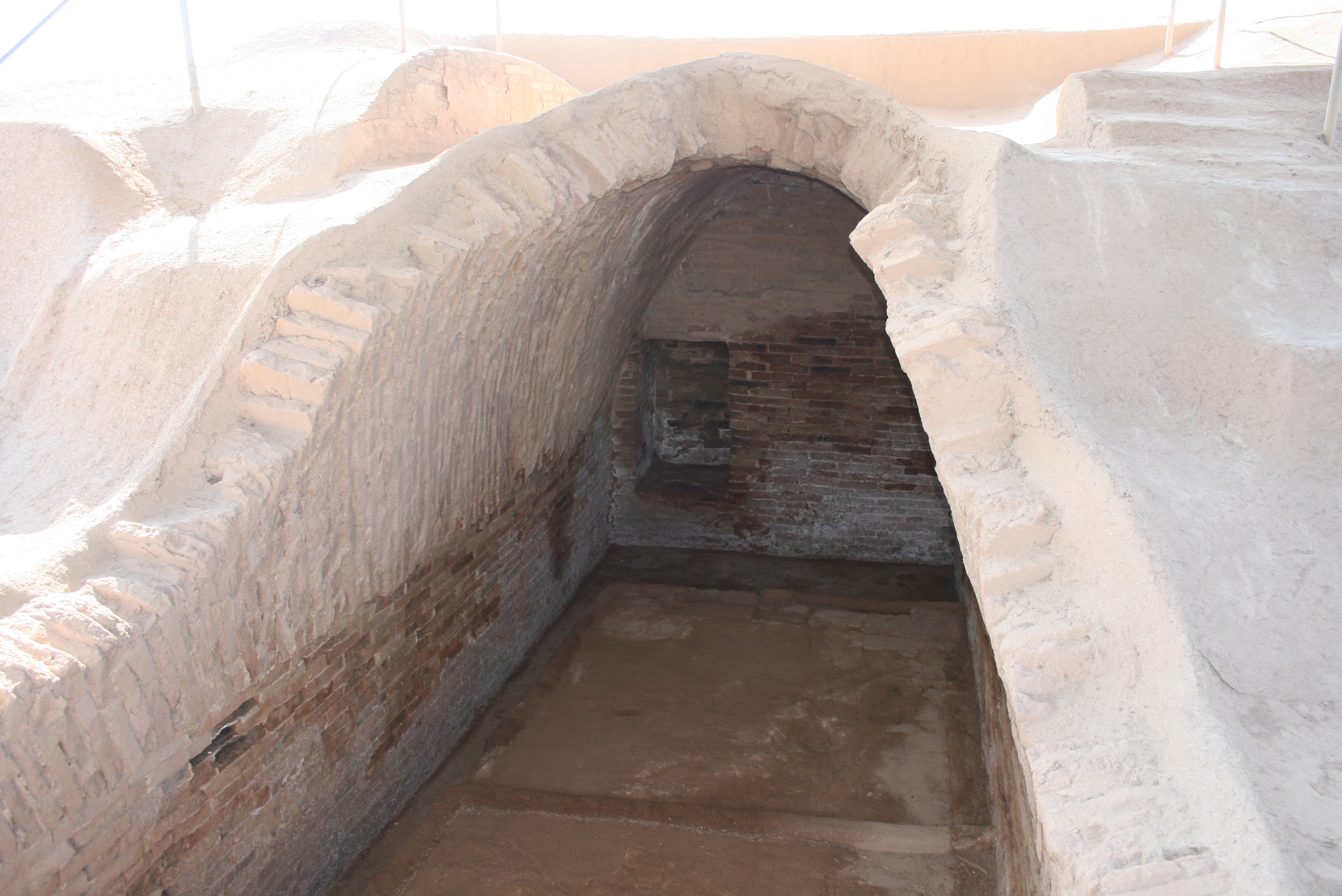
Royal Tomb at Haft Tepe

The site is around 1.5 km by 800 meters made up of 14 mounds with the highest being 17 meters high. Haft Tepe was first surveyed by the French archaeologist Jacques de Morgan in 1908. The site was excavated in the period from 1965 to 1979 by a team from the Institute of Archaeology of the University of Tehran, led by the Iranian archaeologist Ezzat Negahban. A legal document was found sealed with a cylinder seal, unusual at that time:

"Išme-karāb, king of the city of Susa, hated the utukku demon and to the city of Susa, when out of his doors he caused (him) to leave, he gave a seal, to which he afterwards gave power. He or his adversary in court, should they contest the agreement again, the kidinnu of Napiriša and Inšušinak has been touched upon. And he who shall alter this seal(ed tablet), may he go away upon the command of Napiriša and Inšušinak. The sceptre of Išme-karāb may it be put upon his head.

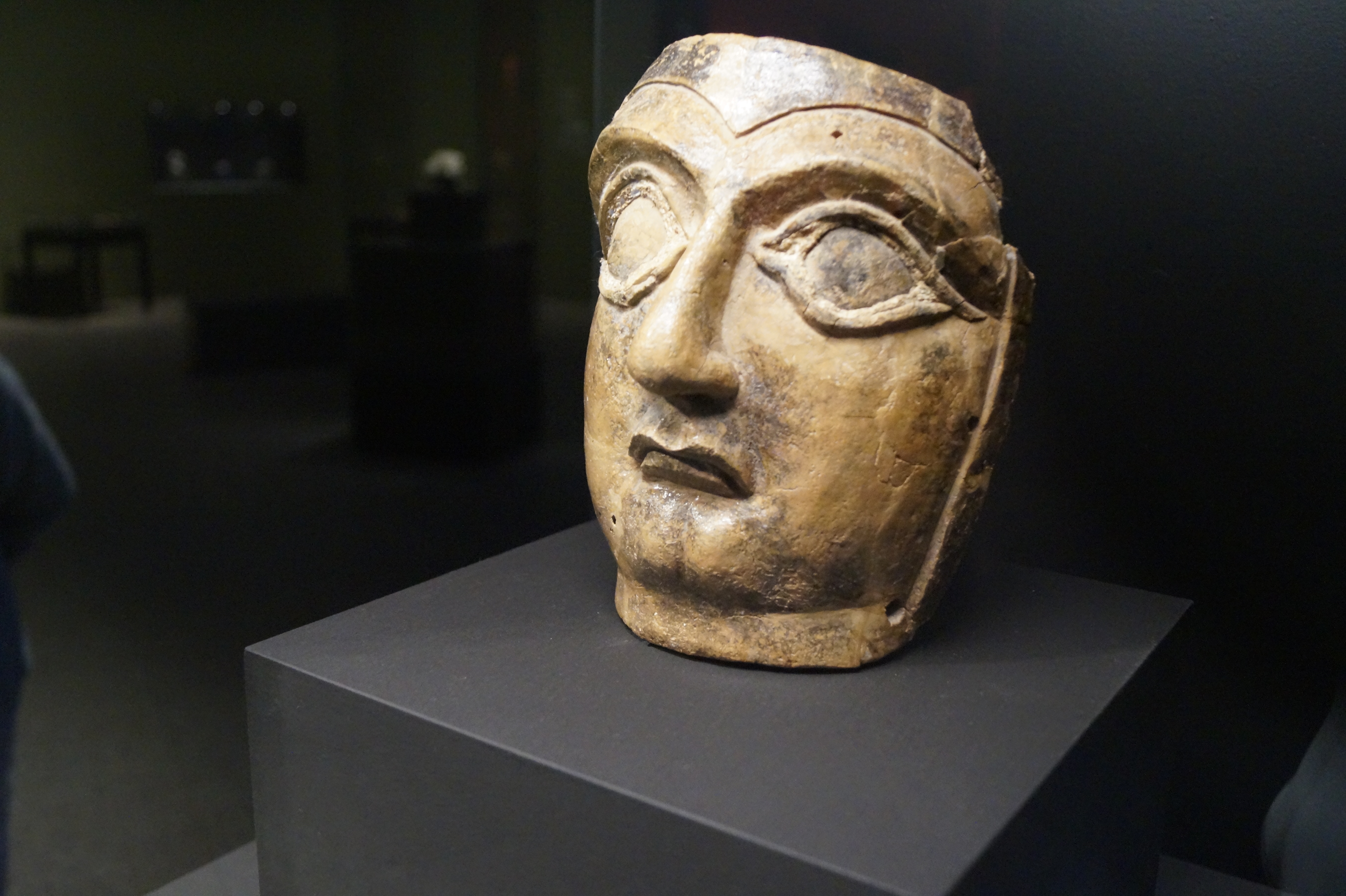
Ceramic funeral sculpture from Iran, Elamite, c. 1750 BC. From Haft Tepe

Since 2003 excavations have been carried out by a team of German-Iranian archaeologists, including the University of Mainz, University of Kiel and the Iranian Cultural Heritage Organization, headed by Behzad Mofidi in ten seasons through 2013.

In the 2006 season a number of cuneiform administrative tablets were recovered and have now been published. They are primarily inventories. One tablet is sealed with the royal seal of Tepti-ahar, king of Susa, and has a year name of "the year in which the (local) king repulsed/expelled Kadašman-^{d}kur.gal". Speculation on who this refers to has ranged from Kassite ruler Kadashman-Enlil II or Kadashman-Harbe I to even some local Kassite ruler not part of the Kassite dynasty.

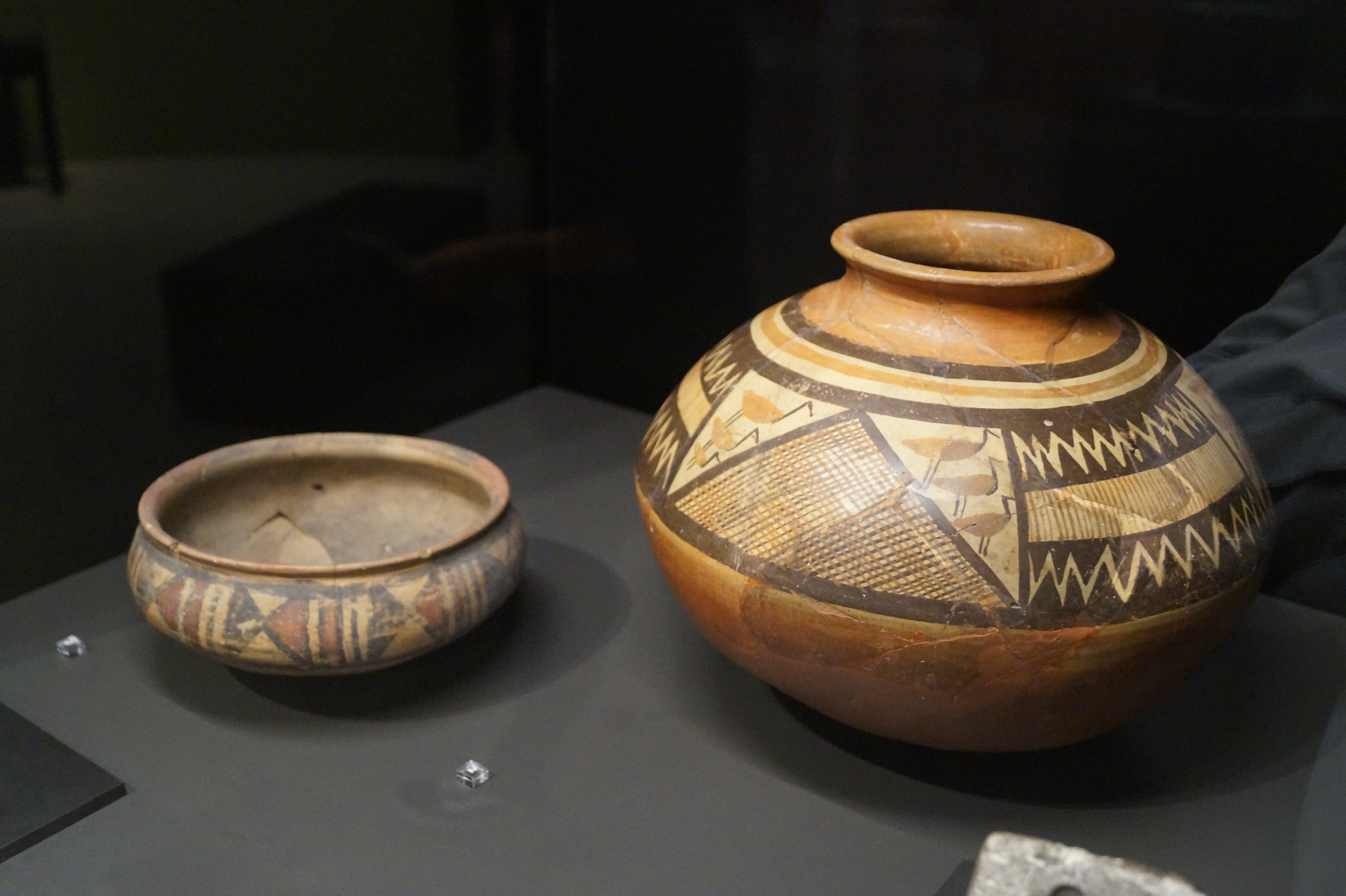
Ceramics from Iran - finds from Haft tepe (Tappe Haftawan), Urmia Ware, c. 1750 BC

When French archaeologists were working at Susa workmen turned in objects they had found. Some are not thought to have come from Haft Tepe including a brick reading:

". Tepti-ahar, king of Susa [made ? ] a statue of himself and of his servant girls to whom he is gracious, and interceding female figures who would intercede for him and for his servant girls to whom he is gracious; he built a house of baked bricks and gave it to his lord Inšušinak. May Inšušinak show him favor as long as he lives. When night falls, four women of the guardians of the house .... they must not act in concert to peel off the gold; their garments should be fastened with strings; they should come in and sleep at the feet of the lamassu- and karibu-figures; they should ...."

== Transport ==
A railway station is located near the site, alongside housing which in 2006 had a population of 190, in 32 families.

== See also ==
- Cities of the ancient Near East
