= Bassetki Statue =

Partial Akkadian statue

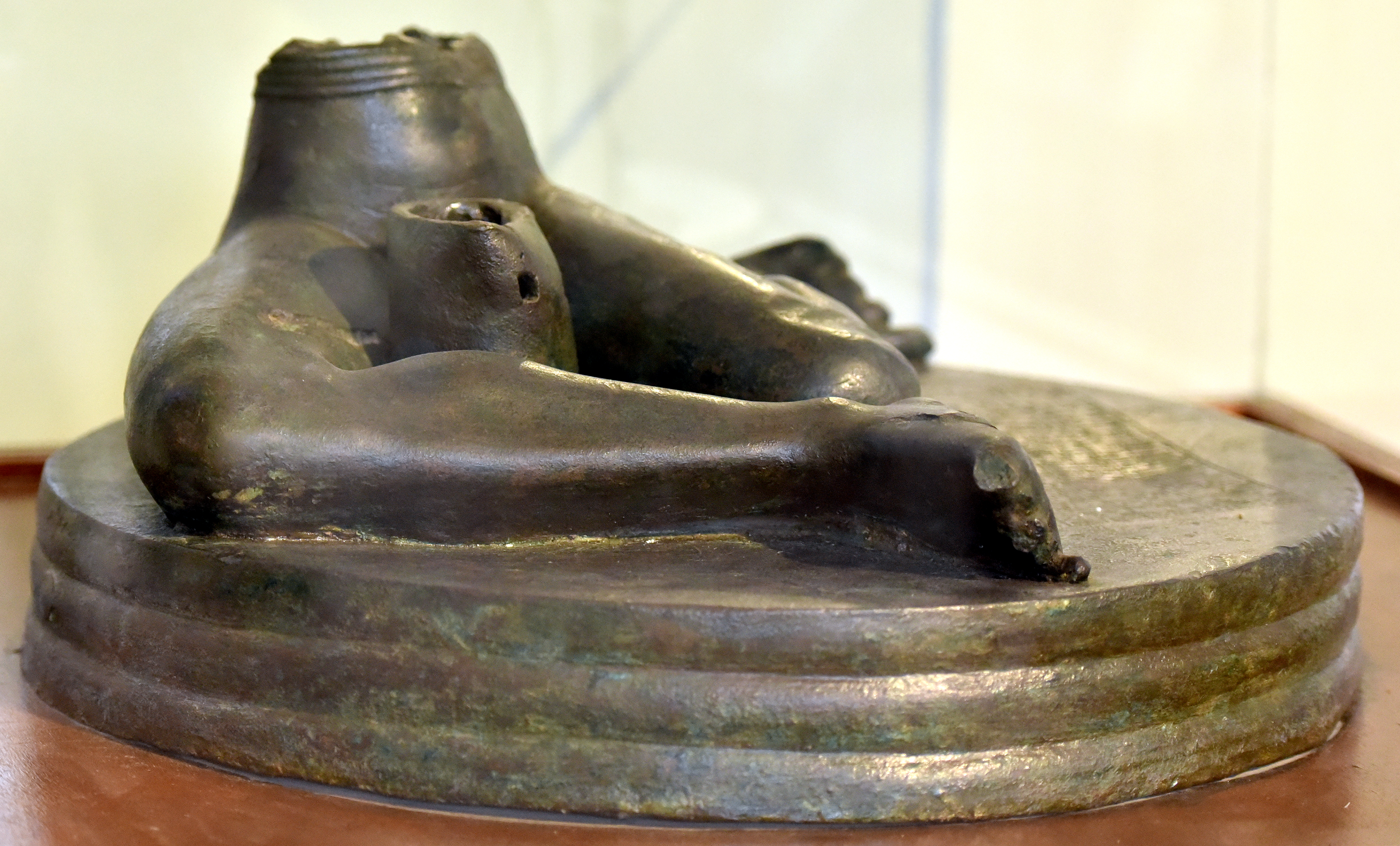
- The Bassetki statue in its display case at the Iraq Museum in Baghdad, March 2019. The inscription is in old Akkadian cuneiform.

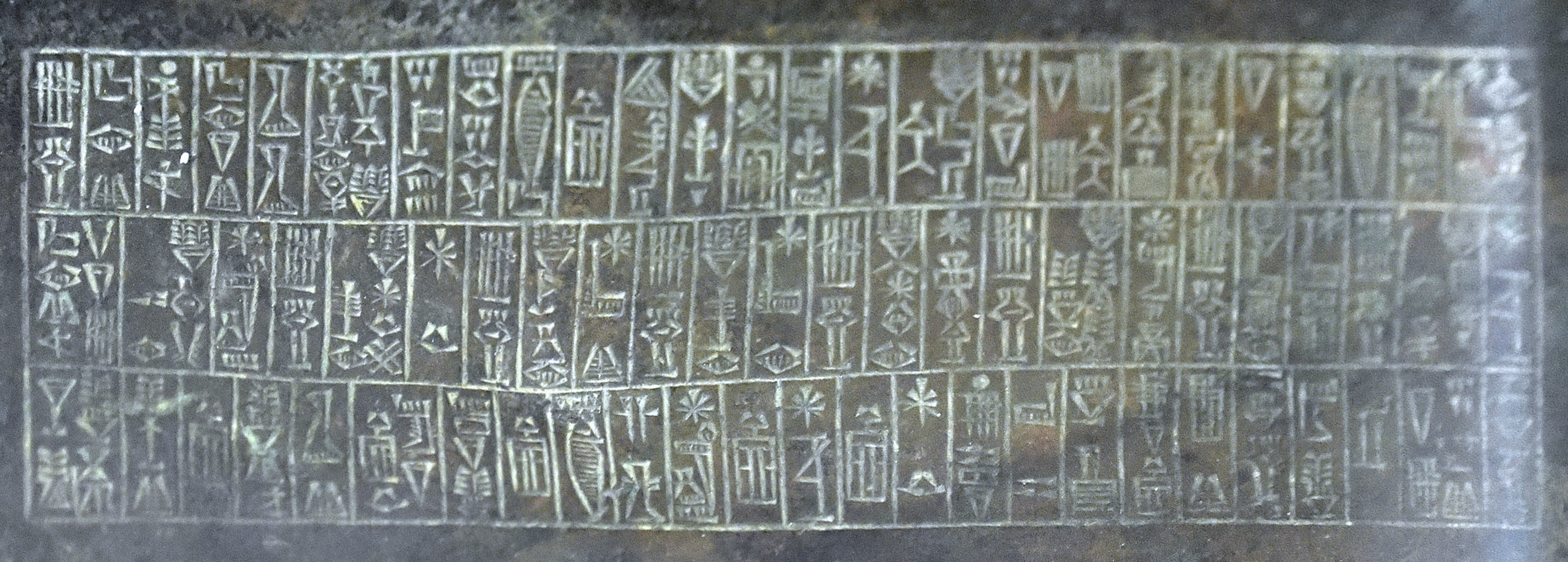
- Material: Copper
- Height: 43 cm
- Width: 67 cm
- Weight: 150 kg (330 lb)
- Writing: Old Akkadian cuneiform
- Created: c. 2235 BC
- Discovered: 1974; Bassetki, Duhok, Iraq
- Present location: Iraq Museum, Baghdad
- Identification: IM77823

The Bassetki Statue is a monument from the Akkadian period (2350–2100 BCE) in Mesopotamia. It was discovered in 1974 during road construction near the site of the village Bassetki (located near the road between Duhok and Zakho Duhok Governorate, northern Iraq) for military purposes. The pedestal contains an inscription in Akkadian, indicating that the statue once stood in the doorway of a palace of the Akkadian ruler Naram-Sin (reigned c. 2254–2218 BCE).

The statue consists of a seated naked man on a round base. The upper body and the head of the figure have been broken off. It was cast from 98.2% pure copper using the lost-wax process. The statue's base is a diameter of 67 centimetres (26 in) and is 25 centimetres (9.8 in) high. The preserved part of the figure itself is 18 centimetres (7.1 in) high. The statue weighs 150 kilograms (330 lb).

The Bassetki Statue contains a cuneiform inscription written in Old Akkadian. The inscription deals with the Akkadian ruler Naram-Sin (2254–2218 BCE), grandson and third successor of Sargon of Akkad, the founder of the Akkadian Empire. It recounts that, after Naram-Sin crushed a large-scale revolt against his rule, the inhabitants of the city of Akkad asked the gods to make Naram-Sin the god of their city, and that they built a temple for him in the middle of the city.

"Naram-Sin, the mighty, king of Agade, when the four quarters together revolted against him, through the love which the goddess Astar showed him, he was victorious in nine battles in one in 1 year, and the kings whom they (the rebels[?]) had raised (against him), he captured. In view of the fact that he protected the foundations of his city from danger, (the citizens of his city requested from Astar in Eanna, Enlil in Nippur, Dagan in Tuttul, Ninhursag in Kes, Ea in Eridu, Sin in Ur, Samas in Sippar, (and) Nergal in Kutha, that (Naram-Sin) be (made) the god of their city, and they built within Agade a temple (dedicated) to him. As for the one who removes this inscription, may the gods Samas, Astar, Nergal, the bailiff of the king, namely all those gods (mentioned above) tear out his foundations and destroy his progeny."

According to the interpretation of A. Zgoll, the deities demand that a ritual be performed to transform Narāam-Sin into a deity. In this ritual, the so-called 'Temple Hymn Collection' is likely to have played a central role as a song for the unification of the temples of the country. Several scholars believe that the statue stands out for its naturalistic rendering of the human body. This naturalism was a new development characteristic for the Akkadian period.

== Loss and recovery in 2003 invasion ==
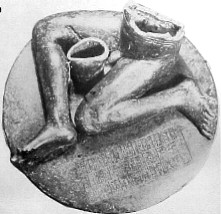
Bassetki statue

The Bassetki Statue was among the many artifacts that were looted from the Iraq Museum during the 2003 invasion of Iraq. During the theft, it had been dropped several times, as could be determined from a trail of cracks in the floor of the museum. It was listed number 2 on a list of the 30 most-wanted antiquities that were stolen from the museum. Its recovery came about after the American 812th Military Police Company raided a house and arrested three people in October 2003. They revealed the location of the Bassetki Statue, which turned out to be coated in axle grease and hidden in a cesspool. It was subsequently fished out and displayed in the Iraq Museum on 11 November, together with over 800 stolen small objects that had also been retrieved.

== See also ==
- Art of Mesopotamia
