= Tepti-Ahar =

King of Elam
- Reign: c. 1440 – c. 1420 BC
- Predecessor: Shalla
- Successor: Inshushinak-shar-ili
- Died: c. 1420 BC

Tepti-Ahar (died c. 1420 BC) was the king of Elam at the end of 15th or the beginning of 14th century BC. He was apparently the last king of the Kidinuid dynasty, who returned to the use of the old title "King of Susa and Anzan".

Tepti-Ahar built a new capital of Kabnak (modern Haft Tepe, 10 km from Susa). The excavated archive shows the diplomatic exchange with Babylon, possibly even dynastic marriages. A tablet found at Haft Tepe (HT38) is dated to the “year when the king expelled Kadašman-KUR.GAL”. The tablet has a seal of Tepti-Ahar, King of Susa. KUR.GAL could be read either as “Harbe”or “Enlil” (since Harbe is a Kassite god parallel to Babylonian Enlil), p. 202-204.

Based on the prosopography of tablets found in the archive from Haft Tepe, it can be stated that Tepti-ahar succeeded another Kidinuid king, Inshushinak-shar-ilani (see tablets HT29-30).
