= List of monarchs of Mitanni =

List of kings of Mittani from the 16th to the 13th century BCE. All dates must be taken with caution since they are worked out only by comparison with the chronology of other ancient Near Eastern nations.

| Depiction | Ruler | Approx. date of reign | Succession | Notes |
|---|---|---|---|---|
Old Babylonian period (c. 2000 – c. 1000 BC)
Mitannian Empire (c. 1500 – c. 1270 BC)
| | Maitta | Uncertain | Eponymous founder | Possibly mythical |
| | Kirta | r. c. 1540 BCE (MC) r. c. 1500 BC (SC) | First known king | May also be legendary |
| | Shuttarna I | r. c. 1510 BCE (MC) r. c. 1493 BC (SC) | Son of Kirta | Known from an Alalakh seal |
| | Parattarna I | r. c. 1490 BCE (MC) r. c. 1420 BCE (SC) | | temp. of: Idrimi; Pilliya; Zidanta II |
| | Parshatatar | r. c. 1480 BCE (MC) r. c. 1410 BCE (SC) | Son of Parattarna I | |
| | Shaushtatar | r. c. 1460 BCE (MC) r. c. 1410 BC (SC) | Son of Parattarna I | Sacked Assur; temp. of: Sinia and Qis-Addu; Tudhaliya I; Niqmepa |
| | Parattarna II | r. c. 1435 BC (MC) r. c. 1390 BC (SC) | | temp. of: Qis-Addu |
| | Shaitarna | r. c. 1425 BC (MC) r. c. 1365 BC (SC) | | temp. of: Qis-Addu |
| | Artatama I | r. c. 1400 BC (MC) r. c. 1345 BC (SC) | Son of Shaushtatar | temp. of Amenhotep II; Signed a treaty with Thutmose IV |
| | Shuttarna II | r. c. 1380 BC (MC) r. c. 1320 BC (SC) | Son of Artatama I (?) | His daughter married Amenhotep III in the tenth year of his reign |
| | Artashumara | r. c. 1360 BC (MC) r. c. 1280 BC (SC) | Son of Shuttarna II | Brief reign |
| | Tushratta | r. c. 1358 BC (MC) r. c. 1350 BC (SC) | Son of Shuttarna II | temp. of: Suppiluliuma I; Amenhotep III; Amenhotep IV; Also known from the Amarna letters |
| | Artatama II | r. c. 1335 BC (MC) r. c. 1232 BC (SC) | | temp. of Ashur-uballit I; He signed a treaty with Suppiluliuma I; He ruled at the same time as Tushratta |
| | Shuttarna III | r. c. 1330 BC (MC) r. c. 1227 BC (SC) | Son of Artatama II | temp. of Suppiluliuma I |
| | Shattiwaza | r. c. 1330 BC (MC) r. c. 1202 BC (SC) | Son of Tushratta | Mitanni became a vassal of the Hittites |
| | Shattuara I | r. c. 1305 BC (MC) r. c. 1182 BC (SC) | | Mittani became a vassal under Adad-nirari I |
| | Wasashatta | r. c. 1285 BC (MC) r. c. 1162 BC (SC) | Son of Shattuara I | |
| | Shattuara II | r. c. 1271– BC (MC) r. c. 1261– BC (SC) | Brother of Tushratta (?) | He was the last king of the Mitanni |
