= List of state leaders in the 13th century BC =

State leaders in the 14th century BC – State leaders in the 12th century BC – State leaders by year

This is a list of state leaders in the 13th century BC (1300–1201 BC).

== Africa: Northeast ==
Egypt: New Kingdom

- Eighteenth Dynasty of the New Kingdom (complete list) –

- Horemheb, King (1319–1292 BC)

- Nineteenth Dynasty of the New Kingdom (complete list) –

- Ramesses I, King (1292–1290 BC)
- Seti I, King (1290–1279 BC)
- Ramesses II, King (1279–1213 BC)
- Merneptah, King (1213–1203 BC)
- Amenmesses, Pharaoh (1203–1197 BC)
- Seti II, Pharaoh (1201–1198 BC)

== Asia ==
=== Asia: East ===
China

- Shang, China (complete list) –

- Yang Jia, King (c.1300 BC)
- Pan Geng, King (c.1290–1263 BC)
- Xiao Xin, King (c.1263–1260 BC)
- Xiao Yi, King (c.1260–1250 BC)
- Wu Ding, King (c.1250-1192 BC)

=== Asia: Southeast ===
Vietnam

- Hồng Bàng dynasty (complete list) –

- Giáp line, (c.1331–c.1252 BC)
- Ất line, (c.1251–c.1162 BC)

=== Asia: West ===
- Hittite: New Kingdom, Asia minor –

- Mursili II, Ruler (c.1321–1295 BC, short chronology)
- Muwatalli II, Ruler (c.1295–1272 BC, short chronology)
- Mursili III a.k.a. Urhi-Teshub, (c.1272–1267 BC, short chronology)
- Hattusili III, Ruler (c.1267–1237 BC, short chronology)
- Tudhaliya IV, Ruler (c.1237–1209 BC, short chronology)
- Arnuwanda III, Ruler (c.1209–1207 BC, short chronology)
- Suppiluliuma II, Ruler (c.1207–1178 BC, short chronology)

- Mitanni –

- Shattuara Mittani becomes vassal of Assyria under Adad-nirari I
- Wasashatta, King ( 000 )
- Jiar, King ( 000 )
- Shattiwaza Mitanni becomes vassal of the Hittite Empire
- Shattuara Mittani becomes vassal of Assyria under Adad-nirari I
- Wasashatta, King ( 000 )
- Jiar, King ( 000 )

- Ugarit, List –

- Niqmepa, King (c.1313–1260 BC) Treaty with Mursili II of the Hittites
- Ammittamru II, King (c.1260–1235 BC) Contemporary of Bentisina of Amurru
- Ibiranu, King (c.1235–1225/20 BC BC)
- Niqmaddu III, King (c.1225/20 – 1215 BC)
- Ammurapi, King (c.1200 BC BC) Contemporary of Chancellor Bay

- Tyre, Phoenecia –

- Aribas, King (fl. c.1230 BC)
- Baal-Termeg, King (fl. c.1220)

- Assyria: Middle Assyrian Period

- Arik-den-ili, King (c.1307–1296 BC, short chronology)
- Adad-nirari I, King (c.1295–1264 BC, short chronology)
- Shalmaneser I, King (c.1263–1234 BC, short chronology)

- Middle Babylonian period: Kassite dynasty, Third Dynasty of Babylon (complete list) –

- Nazi-Maruttash, King (c.1307–1282 BC), contemporary of Adad-nirari I of Assyria
- Kadashman-Turgu, King (c.1281–1264 BC), contemporary of Hattusili III of the Hittites
- Kadashman-Enlil II, King (c.1263–1255 BC), contemporary of Hattusili III of the Hittites
- Kudur-Enlil, King (c.1254–1246 BC)
- Shagarakti-Shuriash, King (c.1245–1233 BC)
- Kashtiliashu IV, King (c.1232–1225 BC), contemporary of Tukulti-Ninurta I of Assyria
- Enlil-nadin-shumi, Assyria installed governor (c.1224 BC)
- Kadashman-Harbe II, Assyria installed governor (c.1223 BC)
- Adad-shuma-iddina, Assyria installed governor (c.1222–1217 BC)
- Adad-shuma-usur, King (c.1216–1187 BC), contemporary of Ashur-nirari III of Assyria

- Elam: Igehalkid dynasty (complete list) –

- Unpahash-Napirisha, King (14th/13th century BC)
- Kidin-hutran I, King (c.1240 BC)
- Kidin-hutran II, King (c.1235 BC)
- Napirisha-Untash, King (c.1230 BC)
- Kidin-Hutran III, King (c.1217 BC)
