= Shuttarna =

Shuttarna is the name of several Mitanni rulers:

- Shuttarna I, reigned in the early 15th century BCE
- Shuttarna II, reigned in the early 14th century BCE
- Shuttarna III, reigned for a short period in the 14th century BCE
