= Artatama =

Artatama may refer to:

- Artatama I, a fifteenth-century BC king of Mitanni
- Artatama II, an usurper to the throne of Tushratta of Mitanni
