= Tushratta =

14th-century BCE king of Mitanni

King of Mitanni
- Reign: c. 1358 – c. 1335 BC
- Predecessor: Artashumara
- Successor: Artatama II
- Died: c. 1335 BC
- Cause of death: Assassination
- Spouse: Juni
- Issue: Shattiwaza; Tadukhipa
- Father: Shuttarna II

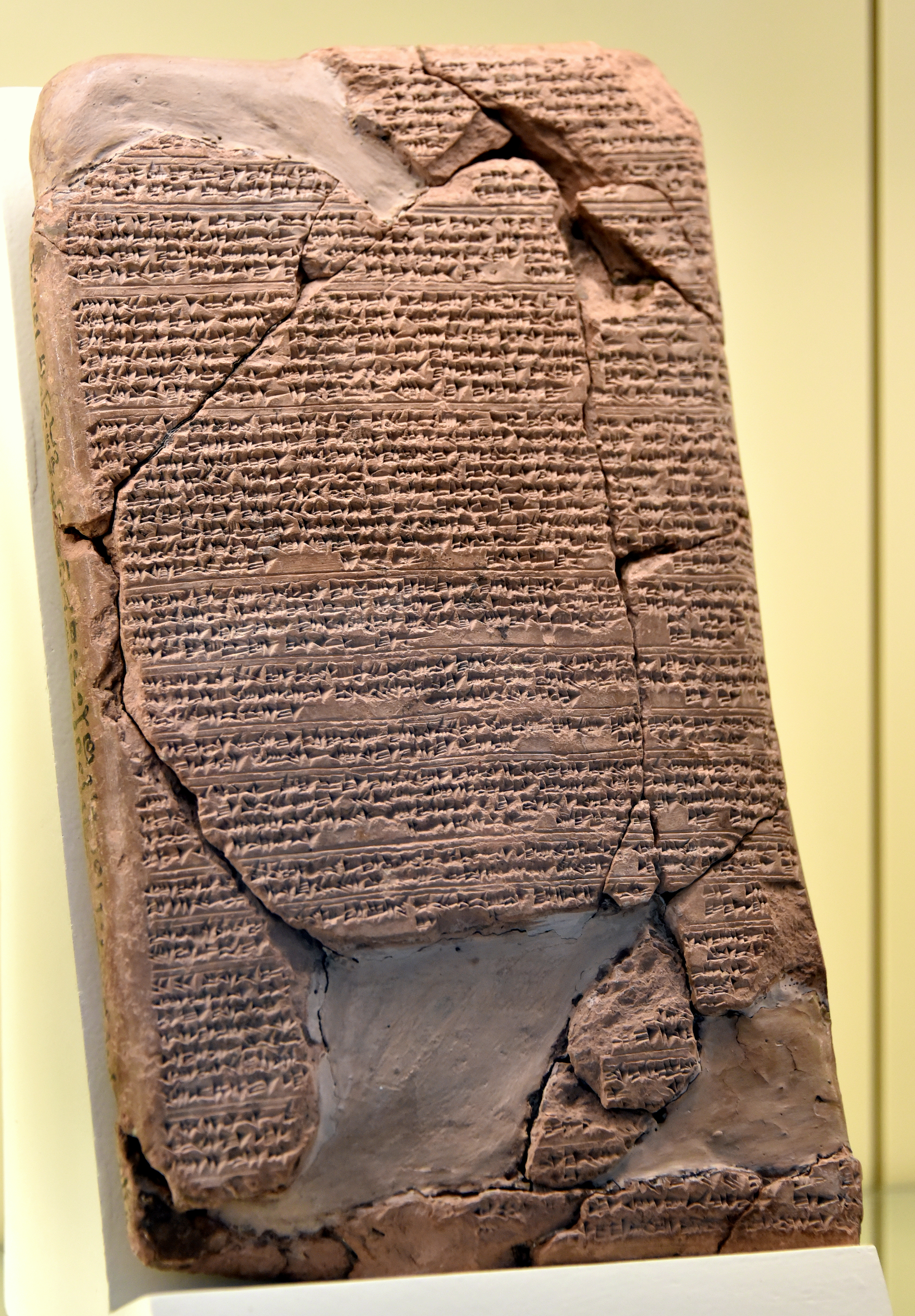
One of the Amarna letters. A letter from Tushratta king of Mitanni to the Egyptian Pharaoh Amenhotep III, c. 1370 BC. Akkadian cuneiform text. From Tell el-Amarna, Egypt. Vorderasiatisches Museum, Berlin.

Tushratta (Akkadian: Tušratta and Tuišeratta; died c. 1335 BC) was a king of Mitanni at the end of the reign of Amenhotep III and throughout the first half of the reign of Amenhotep IV. He was the son of Shuttarna II. He was also the grandson of Artatama I. His sister Gilukhipa (Gilu-ḫepa in Hurrian) and his daughter Tadukhipa (Tadu-ḫepa in Hurrian) were married to the Egyptian pharaoh Amenhotep III; Tadukhipa later married Amenhotep IV, who took over his father's royal harem.

He had been placed on the throne after the assasination of his brother Artashumara. He was probably quite young at the time and was destined to serve as a figurehead only, but he managed to dispose of the murderer. A tablet was found in a Mitanni building at Tell Brak which stated it was witnessed "in the presence of Tushratta, the king" and had a seal of an earlier king Shaushtatar on the reverse, which was a common practice.

== Name ==
Recorded in three distinct spellings—Tušratta, Tušeratta, Tuišeratta—Tushratta's name is an Akkadianised rendition of an Indo-Aryan name Tvaiṣaratha meaning "[one with, having] a charging chariot" (the form "tveṣaratho" / "tveṣa-rathaḥ" is attested in Rigveda 5.61.13).

== Initial conflict with the Hittites ==
At the beginning of his reign, the Hittite King Suppiluliuma I reconquered Kizzuwatna, then invaded the western part of the Euphrates valley and conquered the Amurru and Nuhašše in Hanigalbat. According to the Suppiluliuma-Shattiwaza treaty, Suppiluliuma I had made a treaty with Artatama, a rival of Tushratta. Nothing is known of Artatama's previous life or connection, if any, to the royal family. The document calls him king of the Hurrians, while Tushratta is given the title of "King of Mitanni", which must have disagreed with Tushratta. Suppiluliuma I started to plunder the lands of the west bank of the Euphrates river and he annexed Mount Lebanon. Tushratta threatened to raid beyond the Euphrates if even a single lamb or kid was stolen.

Suppiluliuma I then recounts how the land of Isuwa on the upper Euphrates had seceded in the time of his grandfather. Attempts to conquer it failed. In the time of his father, other cities rebelled. Suppiluliuma I claims to have defeated them, but the survivors fled to the territory of Isuwa that must have been part of Tushratta's realm. A clause to return fugitives was part of many treaties made at the time, so possibly the harbouring of fugitives by Isuwa formed the pretext for the Hittite invasion. A Hittite army crossed the border, entered Isuwa and returned the fugitives (or deserters or government exiles) to Hittite rule. "I freed the lands which I captured; they dwelt in their places. All the people whom I released rejoined their peoples and Hatti incorporated their territories," Suppiluliuma I later boasted.

The Hittite army then marched through various districts towards the Mitanni capital of Washshukanni. Suppiluliuma I claims to have plundered the district and to have brought loot, captives, cattle, sheep and horses back to Hatti. He also claims that Tushratta fled, but obviously he failed to capture the capital. While the campaign weakened Tushratta's kingdom, he still held onto his throne.

== A second campaign ==
In a second campaign, the Hittites again crossed the Euphrates and subdued Halab, Mukish, Niya, Arahati, Apina, and Qatna as well as some cities whose names have not been preserved. Charioteers are mentioned among the booty from Arahati, who were brought to Hatti together with all their possessions. While it was common practice to incorporate enemy soldiers in the army, this might point to a Hittite attempt to counter the most potent weapon of the Mitanni, the war-chariots, by building up or strengthening their own chariot forces.

Tushratta had possibly suspected Hittite intentions on his kingdom, for the Amarna letters include several tablets from Tushratta concerning the marriage of his daughter Tadukhipa with Amenhotep IV, explicitly to solidify an alliance with the Egypt. However, when Suppiluliuma I invaded his kingdom, the Egyptians failed to respond in time—perhaps because of the sudden death of Amenhotep IV, and the resulting struggle for control of the Egyptian throne.

According to a treaty later made between Suppiluliuma I and Shattiwaza, a son of Tushratta, after a third devastating Hittite raid led to the fall of Carchemish, Tushratta was assassinated by a group led by one of his sons. A time of civil war followed which came to an end when Suppiluliuma I placed Shattiwaza on the Mitannian throne.

== Amarna letters ==
Six of the Tushratta letters, including EA 24, were subjected to Neutron Activation Analysis to match the clay composition to potential sites for Waššukanni. The results ruled out a Tell Fakhariyah location.

=== From King Tushratta to Amenhotep III ===
- Amarna letter EA 17,
- Amarna letter EA 18,
- Amarna letter EA 19, "Love and Gold"
- Amarna letter EA 20,
- Amarna letter EA 21,
- Amarna letter EA 22, "Presents from Tushratta to Amenhotep III, when he gave to him his daughter Tadukhipa to wife"
- Amarna letter EA 23, "A Goddess travels to Egypt"
- Amarna letter EA 24,
- Amarna letter EA 25,

=== From King Tushratta to Amenhotep IV (Amenhotep IV) ===
- Amarna letters EA 25
- Amarna letter EA 27, "The missing gold statues again"
- Amarna letter EA 28,
- Amarna letter EA 29,

=== From King Tushratta to Queen Tiye ===
- Amarna letter EA 26, "To the Queen Mother, some missing gold statues"

| Preceded by Artashumara | King of Mitanni c. 1358 – c. 1335 BC | Succeeded by Artatama II |
