= Amarna letter EA 23 =

Short letter

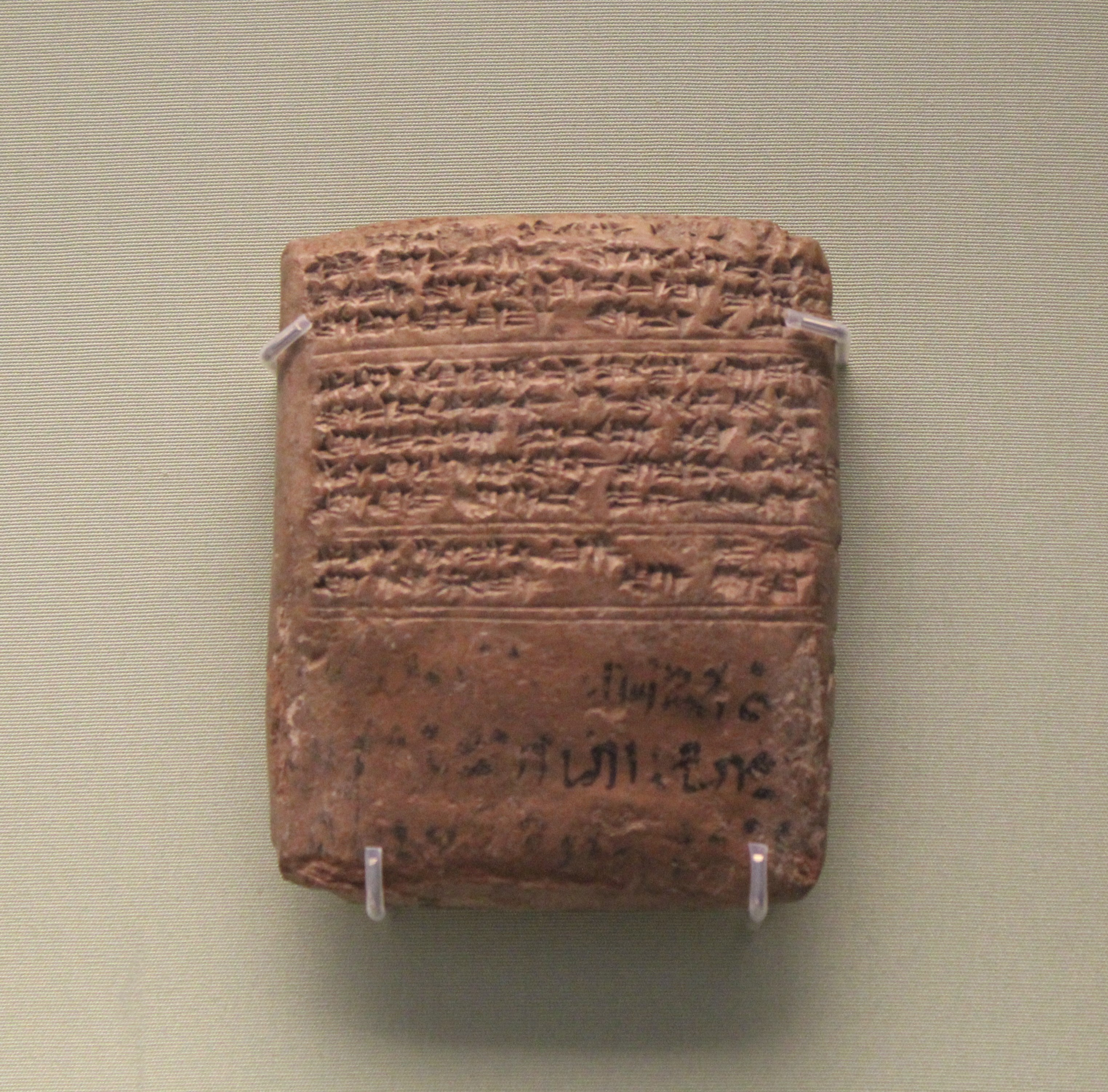
- Back of the letter
- Material: Clay
- Created: c. 1340 BC
- Language: Akkadian

Amarna letter EA 23, titled: "A Goddess Travels to Egypt", is a short letter to the Pharaoh from Tushratta. Due to the ill health of Pharaoh, a statue of Goddess Šauška was sent to Egypt to aid in the health of Pharaoh.

== The letter ==
=== EA 23: "A Goddess Travels to Egypt" ===
EA 23, letter 7 of 13 from Tushratta. (Not a linear, line-by-line translation.)

Obverse ()

(Lines 1-12)--Say to Nimmureya, the king of Egypt, my brother, my son-in-law, whom I love and who loves me: Thus Tushratta, the king of Mittani, who loves you, your father-in-law. For me all goes well. For you may all go well. For your household, for Tadu-Heba, my daughter, your wife, whom you love, may all go well. For your wives, for your sons, for your magnates, for your chariots, for your horses, for your troops, for your country and for whatever else belongs to you, may all go very, very well.
(13-17)--Thus Šauška of Nineveh, mistress of all lands: I wish to go ^{1} to Egypt, a country that I love, and then return. Now I herewith send her, and she is on her way.^{2}
(18-25)--Now, in the time, too, of my father...^{3} went to this country, and just as earlier she dwelt there and they honored her,

Reverse (Image: )

may my brother now honor her 10 times more than before.^{4} May my brother honor her, (then) at (his) pleasure let her go so that she may come back.
(26-30)--May Sauska, the mistress of heaven, protect us, my brother and me, 100,000 years, and may our mistress^{5} grant both of us great joy. And let us act as friends.
(31-32)Is Sauska for me alone my god(dess), and for my brother not his god(dess)?^{6}

== See also ==
- Amarna letters–phrases and quotations
