= Tadukhipa =

Mitanni princess, consort of Pharaoh Amenhotep III

Queen consort of Egypt
- Tenure: c. 1355 BC
- Pharaoh: Amenhotep III; Amenhotep IV
- Born: c. 1370 BC
- Died: c. 1340 BC (aged c. 30)
- Spouse: Amenhotep III; Amenhotep IV
- Father: Tushratta
- Mother: Juni

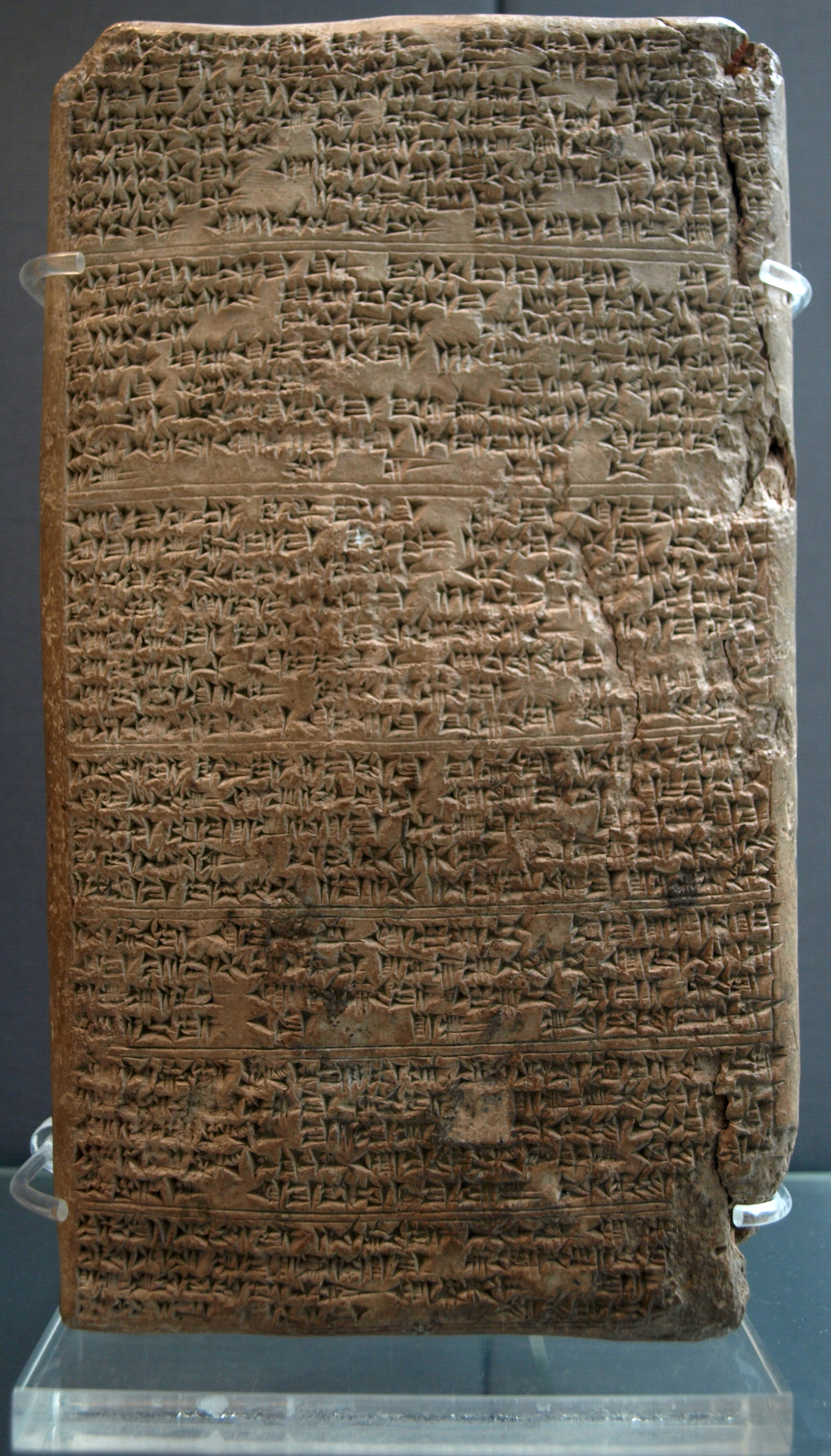
One of the "Amarna Letters" EA 19 negotiating a marriage between Amenhotep III and Tushratta's daughter Tadukhipa

Tadukhipa (in the Hurrian language Tadu-Hepa; c. 1370 BC - c. 1340 BC), was a princess of Mitanni. She was the daughter of King Tushratta of Mitanni and his queen Juni, and the niece of Artashumara. Tadukhipa's aunt Gilukhipa (sister of Tushratta) had married Pharaoh Amenhotep III in his 10th regnal year. Tadukhipa was to marry Amenhotep III more than two decades later.

== Early life ==
Tadukhipa was the daughter of King Tushratta of Mitanni. She is believed to have been born around 1370 BC, Year 21 of the reign of Egyptian Pharaoh Amenhotep III. Almost nothing is known of her early years. Around 1355 BC, Year 36 of Amenhotep III's reign, Tushratta sent her to Egypt to marry the pharaoh, who was a close ally.

Tadukhipa is referenced in seven of Tushratta's 13 Amarna letters, from around 1350-1340 BC. Tushratta requested that his daughter would become a queen consort, even though that position was held by Queen Tiye. Amenhotep III never sent the golden statues he offered in return, and, after his death, Tushratta sent some missives complaining about the lack of reciprocity.

== Life in Egypt ==
King Tushratta sent his daughter to Egypt with many gifts for Pharaoh Amenhotep III. These gifts included: a gold-plated chariot inlaid with precious stones, a pair of horses, a litter adorned with gold and precious stones, clothes and garments, a horse saddle adorned with gold eagles, jewelry such as bracelets, armlets, and other ornaments, and a large chest to hold those items. Amenhotep III had offered to send golden statues to Tushratta as part of the marriage agreement. However, no evidence exists that the gifts were sent to Mitanni.

Tushratta had requested that his daughter become Great Royal Wife to Amenhotep III. However, the position was already held by Queen Tiye. Amenhotep III died soon after Tadukhipa's arrival in Egypt and his son, Amenhotep IV, became pharaoh. Tadukhipa's existence in Egypt is attested to through Amarna letters that mention her, including missives Tushratta sent asking after the golden statues he was promised by Amenhotep III. It is speculated that Tadukhipa eventually remarried Amenhotep IV. During the reign of Amenhotep IV, Tushratta wrote to him multiple times and frequently mentioned his daughter, who had become Amenhotep IV’s wife, for example:

Say to Naphurreya, the king of Egypt, my brother, my son-in-law, whom I love and who loves me: Thus Tušratta, Great King, the king of Mittani, your father-in-law, who loves you, your brother. For me all goes well. For you may all go well. For Teye, your mother, for your household, may all go well. For Tadu-Ḫeba, my daughter, your wife, for the rest of your wives, for your sons, for your magnates, for your chariots, for your horses, for your troops, for your country, and for whatever else belongs to you, may all go very, very well. (EA 27)

== Identification with Kiya or Nefertiti ==
Some scholars tentatively identify Tadukhipa with Kiya, a known wife of Amenhotep IV. It has been suggested that the story of Kiya may be the source for the New Kingdom story called the "Tale of Two Brothers." This fable tells the story of how the pharaoh fell in love with a beautiful foreign woman after smelling her hair. If Tadukhipa was later known as Kiya, then she would have lived at Amarna where she had her own sunshade and was depicted with the pharaoh and at least one daughter.

Others such as Petrie, Drioton, and Vandier have suggested that Tadukhipa was given a new name after becoming the consort of Amenhotep IV and is to be identified the famous queen Nefertiti. This theory suggests that Nefertiti's name "the beautiful one has come" refers to foreign origin, such as Tadukhipa's Mitanni origin. Seele, Meyer and others have pointed out that Tey, wife of Ay, held the title of nurse to Nefertiti, and that this argues against this identification. A mature princess arriving in Egypt would not need a nurse. Moreover, Nefertiti is a quintessentially Egyptian name, whose meaning should instead be associated with Hathor and the myth of the return of the "Distant Goddess".
