= Isuwa =

Bronze Age Anatolian kingdom

Isuwa (transcribed Išuwa and sometimes rendered Ishuwa, Issuwa), was a kingdom founded by the Hurrians, which came under Hittite sovereignty towards 1600 BC as a result of their struggle with the Hittites.

== Location ==
Isuwa on the map of the ancient Middle East in the beginning of the Amarna letters period, the first half of the 14th century BC

Isuwa was located on the eastern bank of the river Euphrates, opposite modern-day Malatya and along the south bank of the Murat Su. The important crossing of the Euphrates from Malatya to Elazığ is referred to in the Hittite texts as the 'Isuwa crossing' (eberti KUR ^{URU}Iśuwa). Isuwa covers the present-day province of Tunceli. The plain had favourable climatic conditions due to the abundance of water from springs and rainfall. Irrigation of fields was possible without the need to build complex canals. The river valley was well suited for intensive agriculture, while livestock could be kept at the higher altitudes. The mountains possessed rich deposits of copper which were mined in antiquity.

- Korucutepe, in the Altınova plain, near Elazığ, Turkey, within the region historically linked to the kingdom of Isuwa.

== History ==
The area was one of the places where agriculture developed very early in the Neolithic period. Urban centres emerged in the upper Euphrates river valley around 3000 BC. The first states may have followed in the third millennium BC.

=== Middle Bronze Age ===
The name Isuwa is not known until the literate Hittite period of the second millennium BC. Few literate sources from within Isuwa have been discovered and the primary source material comes from Hittite texts.

The Isuwans left no written record of their own, and it is not clear which of the Anatolian peoples inhabited the land of Isuwa prior to the Luwians. Aram Kosyan identified etymologically Hittite, Luwian, Indo-Iranian (possibly connected to the Mitanni), Hurrian, and Kaskian personal names in Isuwa, as well as a number of anthroponyms with unknown or unclear origins.

==== Hattusili I ====
To the west of Isuwa lay the hostile kingdom of the Hittites. The Hittite king Hattusili I (c. 1600 BC) is reported to have marched his army across the Euphrates river and destroyed the cities there. This corresponds with burnt destruction layers discovered by archaeologists at town sites in Isuwa at roughly this date.

=== Late Bronze Age ===
The Hittite king Suppiluliuma I records how in the time his father, Tudhaliya II (c. 1400 BC), the land of Isuwa became hostile. The enmity was probably aggravated by the Hurrian kingdom of Mitanni to the south. Mitanni tried to form an alliance against the Hittites. According to a fragmentary Hittite letter, the king of Mitanni, Shaushtatar, seems to have waged war against the Hittite king Arnuwanda I with support from Isuwa. These hostilities lasted into Suppiluliuma's own reign when c. 1350 BC he crossed the Euphrates and entered the land of Isuwa with his troops. He claims to have made Isuwa his subject.

Isuwa continued to be ruled by kings who were vassals of the Hittites. Few kings of Isuwa are known by names and documents. One Ehli-sharruma is mentioned as being king of Isuwa in a Hittite letter from the thirteenth century BC. Another king of Isuwa called Ari-sharruma is mentioned on a clay seal found at Korucutepe, an important site in Isuwa.

=== Iron Age ===
After the fall of the Hittite empire in the early twelfth century BC a new state emerged in Isuwa. The city of Melid became the center of a Luwian state, Kammanu, one of the so-called Neo-Hittite states. With the demise of the Hittites the Phrygians settled to the west, and to the east the kingdom of Urartu was founded. The most powerful neighbour was Assyria to the south. The encounter with the Assyrian king of Tiglath-Pileser I (1115–1077 BC) resulted in Kammanu being forced to pay tribute to Assyria. Kammanu continued to prosper however until the Assyrian king Sargon II (722–705 BC) sacked the city in 712 BC. At the same time the Cimmerians and Scythians invaded Anatolia from the Caucasus to the northeast. The movement of these nomadic people may have weakened Kammanu before the final Assyrian invasion, which probably caused the decline of settlements and culture in this area from the seventh century BC until the Roman period.

== Archaeology ==
The ancient land of Isuwa has today virtually disappeared beneath the water from several dams in the Euphrates river. The Turkish Southeastern Anatolia Project which started in the 1960s resulted in the Keban, Karakaya and Atatürk Dam which entirely flooded the river valley when completed in the 1970s. A fourth dam, Bireçik, was completed further south in 2000 and flooded the remainder of the Euphrates river valley in Turkey.

A great salvage campaign was undertaken in the upper Euphrates river valley at instigation of the president of the dam project Kemal Kurdaş. A Turkish, US and Dutch team of archaeologists headed by Maurits van Loon began the survey. Work then continued downstream where the Atatürk Dam was being constructed. Also, the Keban Dam flooded some sites. Especially the Murat River valleys, and the Altınova plain (Elazığ Province) had many early settlements.

The excavations revealed settlements from the Paleolithic down into the Middle Ages. The sites of Ikizepe, Korucutepe, Norşuntepe and Pulur around the Murat (Arsanias) river, a tributary of the Euphrates to the east, revealed large Bronze Age settlements from the fourth to the second millennium BC. The center of the kingdom Isuwa may have lain in this region which would equate well with the Hittite statements of crossing the Euphrates in reaching the kingdom.

The important site of Arslantepe near the modern city of Malatya luckily remained safe from the rising water. Today an Italian team of archaeologists led by Marcella Frangipane are working at the site and studying the surrounding area. The site of Arslantepe was settled from the fifth millennium BC until the Roman period. It was the capital of the Neo-Hittite kingdom of Malatya.

The earliest settlements in Isuwa show cultural contacts with Tell Brak to the south, though not being the same culture. Agriculture began early due to favorable climatic conditions. Isuwa was at the outer fringe of the early Mesopotamian Uruk period culture. The people of Isuwa were also skilled in metallurgy and they reached the Bronze Age in the fourth millennium BC. Copper was first mixed with arsenic, later with tin. The Early Bronze Age culture was linked with the Caucasus in the northeast. In the Hittite period the culture of Isuwa shows great parallels to the Central Anatolian and Hurrian cultures to the south. The monumental architecture was of Hittite influence. The Neo-Hittite state show influences both from Phrygia, Assyria and the eastern kingdom of Urartu. After the Scythian people migrated to the region, some Scythian burials appear in the area.

== See also ==
- Ancient regions of Anatolia
- Assyria
- History of the Hittites
- Hurrians
- Indo-European languages
- Mitanni
- Mesopotamia
- Phrygians
- Hayasa-Azzi

== Bibliography ==
- Conti, Persiani : Between the Rivers and over the Mountains, La Sapienza Rome 1993.
- Erder, Cevat: Lessons in Archaeological and Monument Salvage: The Keban Experience, Princeton university 1973.
- Konyar, Erkan: Old Hittite presence in the East of the Euphrates in the light of stratigraphical data from Imikuşağı (Elazığ), lecture held at Hethiter-workshop Istanbul 2004.
- Loon, Maurits van: Korucutepe : final report on the excavations of the universities of Chicago, California (Los Angeles) and Amsterdam in the Keban reservoir, American Elsevier New York 1975-80 (3 vol.).

== Sources ==
- Tuncel, Metin (2012). "Tunceli". TDV İslâm Ansiklopedisi (in Turkish). Vol. 41. pp. 380–381.
