= Ṛta =

Vedic principle of universal nature order

In the Vedic religion, Ṛta (/ɹ̩t̪ɐ/; Sanskrit ऋत ṛta "order, rhythm, rule; truth; logos") is the principle of natural order which regulates and coordinates the operation of the universe and everything within it. (Note: Panikkar (2001:350-351) remarks: "Ṛta is the ultimate foundation of everything; it is "the supreme", although this is not to be understood in a static sense. [...] It is the expression of the primordial dynamism that is inherent in everything....") In the hymns of the Vedas, Ṛta is described as that which is ultimately responsible for the proper functioning of the natural, moral and sacrificial orders. Conceptually, it is closely allied to the injunctions and ordinances thought to uphold it, collectively referred to as Dharma, and the action of the individual in relation to those ordinances, referred to as Karma – two terms which eventually eclipsed Ṛta in importance as signifying natural, religious and moral order in later Hinduism. Sanskrit scholar Maurice Bloomfield referred to Ṛta as "one of the most important religious conceptions of the Rigveda", going on to note that, "from the point of view of the history of religious ideas we may, in fact we must, begin the history of Hindu religion at least with the history of this conception".

== Etymology ==
Vedic ṛtá and its Avestan equivalent aṣ̌a both derive from Proto-Indo-Iranian *Hr̥tás "truth", which in turn continues Proto-Indo-European *h₂r-tós "properly joined, right, true", from a presumed root *h₂er-, making it a distant cognate of Latin ordo and thus English order. The derivative noun ṛta is defined as "fixed or settled order, rule, divine law or truth".

As Mahony (1998) notes the term can be translated as "that which has moved in a fitting manner". Although this meaning is not actually cited by authoritative Sanskrit dictionaries it is a regular derivation from the verbal root ṛ, "to move" with ta, the suffix which forms the past participle, so it can be regarded as the putative origin of the word. More abstractly, it is translated as "universal law" or "cosmic order", or simply as "truth". The latter meaning dominates in the Avestan cognate to Ṛta, aṣ̌a.

The proper Sanskrit pronunciation of the word is ṛta, the ṛ being a vocalic r, like that in pert or dirt, when pronounced with a rhotic r, e.g. as in American, followed by a short a. The most common pronunciation of speakers of modern Indian languages is "rita", with short i and short a (sometimes "a" also being dropped due to the syncope, as a phenomenon described as schwa deletion in Indo-Aryan languages), due to the loss of the vocalic r by the successor languages to Sanskrit, the Prakrits and modern Indo-Aryan languages.

The term appears in Vedic texts and in post-Vedic texts, both as Ṛta and derivatives of the term. For example, in the 2nd-century BCE text Mahābhāṣya of Patanjali, he explains Ṛtaka to be the grammatically correct form of name for a son, where then the name would mean "truthling".

== Origins ==
In scholarship there is no common position about the origin of the concept of Ṛta. Similar concepts exist in many Indo-European cultures and the names can in addition be derived from an identical root word *h₂r-tós. This is why some scholars take the position that the concepts in the Indo-European daughter cultures have a common ancestor in the Proto-Indo-European culture.

In contrast Hermann Oldenberg (1894) surmised that the concept of Ṛta originally arose in the Indo-Aryan period from a consideration of the natural order of the world and of the occurrences taking place within it as doing so with a kind of causal necessity. Both Vedic Ṛta and Avestan aša were conceived of as having a tripartite function which manifested itself in the physical, ethical and ritual domains. In the context of Vedic religion, those features of nature which either remain constant or which occur on a regular basis were seen to be a manifestation of the power of Ṛta in the physical cosmos. In the human sphere, Ṛta was understood to manifest itself as the imperative force behind both the moral order of society as well as the correct performance of Vedic rituals. The notion of a universal principle of natural order is by no means unique to the Vedas, and Ṛta has been compared to universal principle in other cultures, such as Ma'at in Ancient Egyptian religion, Moira and the Logos in Greek paganism, and the Dao.

== Vedas ==
Due to the nature of Vedic Sanskrit, a term such as Ṛta can be used to indicate numerous things, either directly or indirectly, and both Indian and European scholars have experienced difficulty in arriving at fitting interpretations for Ṛta in all of its various usages in the Vedas, though the underlying sense of "ordered action" remains universally evident. In the Rigveda, the term Ṛta appears as many as 390 times, and has been characterized as "the one concept which pervades the whole of Ṛgvedic thought". The cosmic order, Ṛta, has three features:

- Gati, the continuous movement or change.
- Samghatna, a system based on interdependent parts.
- Niyati, an inherent order of interdependence and movement.

Ṛta appears most frequently as representing abstract concepts such as "law", "commandment", "order", "sacrifice", "truth", and "regularity", but also occasionally as physical phenomena such as the waters, the heavens, or the sun as manifestations of the operation of Ṛta. Ṛta is also frequently used in reference to various Vedic deities. Thus, Bṛhaspati is referred to as possessing a powerful bow with "Ṛta as its string" and as one prepared to "mount the chariot of Ṛta"; Agni is described as one who is "desirous of Ṛta", one who is "Ṛta-minded" and as he who "spread Heaven and Earth by Ṛta"; the Maruts are referred to as "rejoicing in the house of Ṛta" and as "knowers of Ṛta"; Ushas is described as having been "placed at the root of Ṛta"; Varuna is praised as "having the form of Ṛta" and, along with Mitra as Mitra-Varuna, as "destroying the foes by Ṛta" and as "professing Ṛta by Ṛta". Epithets such as "born of Ṛta" and "protector of Ṛta" are frequently applied to numerous divinities, as well as to the sacrificial fire and the sacrifice itself.

Despite the abundance of such references, the gods are never portrayed as having command over Ṛta. Instead, the gods serve it in the form of various roles such as its executors, agents, or protectors. As Day (1982) notes, the gods "do not govern Ṛta so much as immanentalize it through the particularities of divine ordinances and retributions concerning both rewards and punishments. In this sense, they do not "govern" Ṛta; they serve it as agents and ministers". The relationship between the gods and Ṛta, as described in the Vedas, is one of mutual dependency. However, most gods are described in various parts of the Rigveda as personifying or embodying Ṛta.

=== Riteesh ===
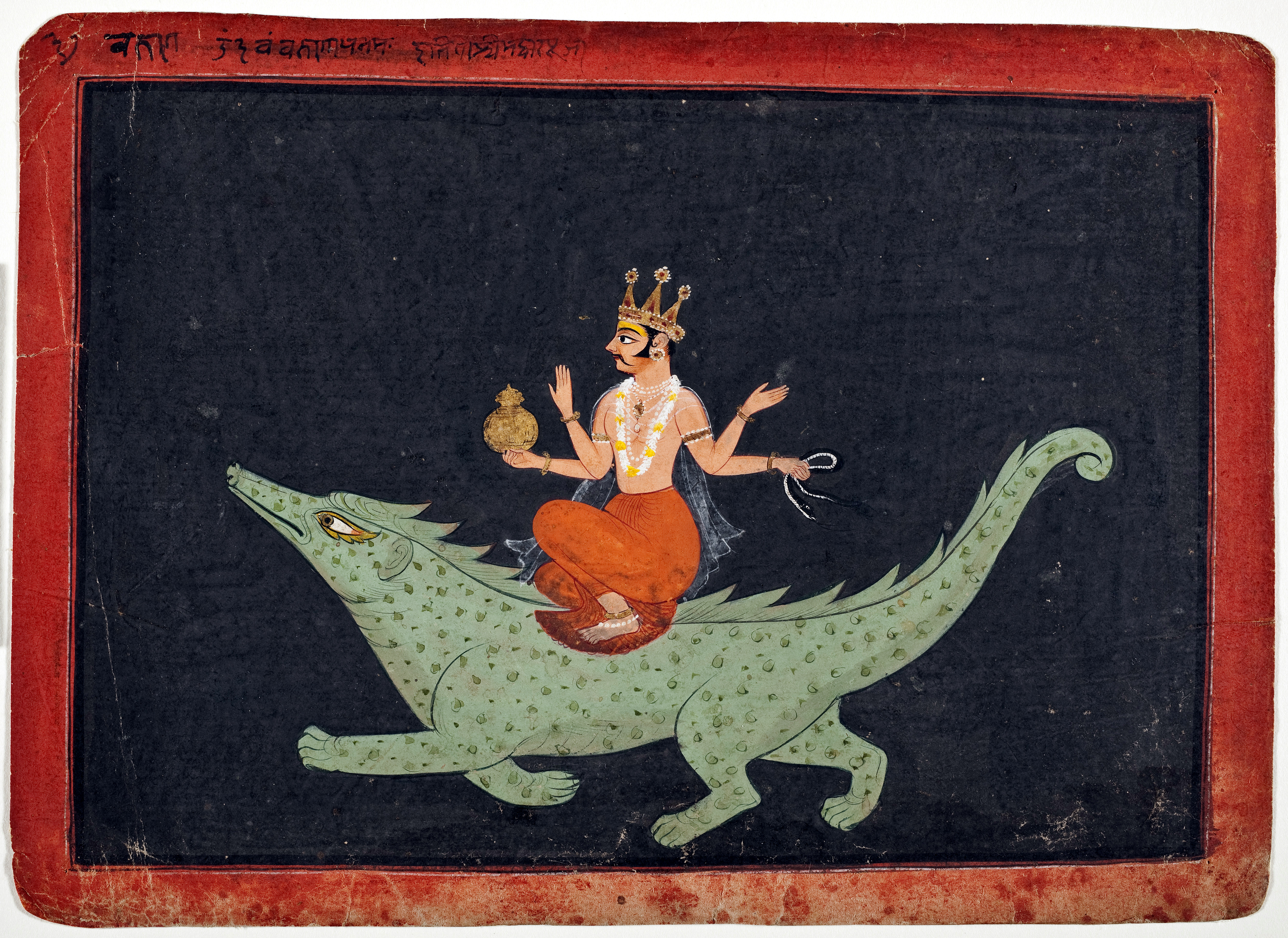
17th-century watercolour depicting Varuna (here astride the Makara), a god closely associated with Ṛta in the Vedas

While the concept of Ṛta as an abstract, universal principle generally remained resistant to the anthropomorphic tendencies of the Vedic period, it became increasingly associated with the actions of individual deities, in particular with those of the god Varuna as the omniscient, all-encompassing sky. Although the Adityas as a group are associated with Ṛta, being referred to as "the charioteers of Ṛta, dwelling in the home of Ṛta", it is Varuna in particular who is identified as the "friend of Ṛta". The connection of Varuna and Ṛta extended beyond the physical realm and into the sphere of ritual worship, with the sacrificial fire itself being lauded as that which "harnesses the steeds and holds the reins of Ṛta, becoming Varuna when he strives for Ṛta". As James (1969) notes, Varuna attained the position of "universal Power par excellence maintaining Ṛta" and is celebrated as having "separated and established heaven and earth, spreading them out as the upper and lower firmaments, himself enthroned above them as the universal king, ordering the immutable moral law, exercising his rule by the sovereignty of Ṛta.

Aside from Varuna, Indra, the supreme God of Heaven, is also associated with being the embodiment of Ṛta, particularly Sat (Truth). Throughout the Vedic corpus, many of Indra's feats and battles—such as the slaying of Vritra—are often metaphorically described as a battle between order and chaos, with Indra establishing Ṛta through his actions alone.

== Dharma ==
Already in the earliest Vedic texts, Ṛta as an ethical principle is linked with the notion of cosmic retribution. A central concept of the Ṛgveda is that created beings fulfil their true natures when they follow the path set for them by the ordinances of Ṛta, and failing to follow those ordinances was thought to be responsible for the appearance of various forms of calamity and suffering. Committing one's actions to the governance of Ṛta, referred to as its "Dharma", was therefore understood as imperative in ensuring one's own well-being. In this vein, the individual who follows the ordinances of nature can be described as one who acts according to the "Dharma of Ṛta". Dharma, then, was originally conceived of as a "finite or particularized manifestation of Ṛta inasmuch as it represents that aspect of the universal Order which specifically concerns the mundane natural, religious, social and moral spheres as expressed in ritualistic regulations, public laws, moral principles and laws of nature".

Though originally understood as a subordinate component of the essentially metaphysical concept of Ṛta, Dharma eventually grew to overshadow Ṛta in prominence in later Vedic and early Hindu literature. According to Day (1982), the concept of Dharma,

...became so useful for framing religious, moral and social regulations, that interest in it and discussion of its applications to social and moral order eclipsed all discussions of metaphysical and theological ideas. Since, moreover, Dharma was made the central subject of a literary tradition which was to become vast and extensive throughout India, while the conception of Ṛta remained largely confined to the Vedas and their commentaries, it naturally took possession of brāhmaṇical thinking even at the expense of older, exalted concepts and conceptions.

== Karma ==
As the notion of Dharma shifted emphasis away from the gods as executors of Ṛta and towards the individual as upholding Ṛta through their actions, the ethical responsibility and culpability of the individual received an increasing amount of emphasis towards the end of the Vedic period. Central to the discussion of such culpability is the notion of Karma. Karma (lit. 'action') refers to the works one performs, which can occur either in congruence with or in opposition to Dharma – and thus, to Ṛta – and which are posited to stand in a causal relationship to the pains and pleasures one experiences in life.

The emergence of Karma as a central doctrine of the late Vedic and early Hindu tradition is due in part to the problem of theodicy. Given the inherent goodness of Ṛta and its absolute power over the operation of the universe, the presence of gross inequality and injustice in the world represented a serious religious, philosophical and ethical dilemma. The notion of Karma helped to overcome this problem as it was conceived as a "law of moral causation" which effectively excused the gods and Ṛta from the appearance of evil in the world, placing the responsibility for the same squarely upon the individual.

Being an extension of Ṛta, Karma was conceived of as operating with the same absolute efficiency. As Day (1982) notes, "acts are causally determinative in accordance with their good or evil nature, and their out-workings are inexorable; there is no intrusive or arbitrary factor which might overcome their potentiality for causing retributional effects, or otherwise interfering with the strictly mechanical efficiency of Karma. Since, moreover, an individual's fortunes and misfortunes are solely the outcome of his past actions, he has no ground for believing that life is kindlier or harsher than is deserved. He has no cause either for praising God's benevolence nor for lamenting God's wrath."

== In proper names ==
Ṛta- or arta- sometimes appears as an element in Vedic and Indic personal names, as with Iranian.

In India the vocalic 'ṛ' of Sanskrit is transformed into the modern 'ri', or in South India, 'ru'. Indian names include:

- Rita
- Ruta
- Ritambhar
- Ritik
- Ritvik
- Ritesh

Mitanni (non-Indian, Vedic) names include:

- Artatama I
- Artashumara
- Artamanya, leader of Ziribashani

== See also ==
- Arthashastra
- Asha (Zoroastrianism)
- Darna (Romuva)
- Dharma (Indian religions)
- Logos
- Maat (Egyptian religion)
- Me (Sumerian religion)
- Moira (Greek paganism)
- Tao (Chinese Taoism)
- Wyrd (Germanic paganism)
- Rod-Rodzanice or Prav (Slavic paganism)

== Sources ==
- Ara, Mitra (2008). Eschatology in the Indo-Iranian Traditions: The Genesis and Transformation of a Doctrine. New York: Peter Lang. ISBN 978-1-4331-0250-9.
- Bilimoria, P.; Prabhu, J.; Sharma, R., eds. (2007). Indian Ethics: Classical Traditions and Contemporary Challenges. Vol. 1. Hampshire: Ashgate Publishing Ltd. ISBN 978-0-7546-3301-3.
- Bloomfield, Maurice (1908). The Religion of the Veda: The Ancient Religion of India, from Rig-Veda to Upanishads. New York: G. P. Putnam's Sons.
- Boyce, Mary (1987). "Ardwashišt". Encyclopedia Iranica. Vol. 2. New York: Routledge & Kegan Paul.
- Brown, W. N. (1992). "Some Ethical Concepts for the Modern World from Hindu and Indian Buddhist Tradition". In Radhakrishnan, S. (ed.). Rabindranath Tagore: A Centenary Volume 1861–1961. Calcutta: Sahitya Akademi. ISBN 81-7201-332-9.
- Davis, Winston (1990). "Natural Law and Natural Right: The Role of Myth in the Discourses of Exchange and Community". In Reynolds, F. E.; Tracy, D. (eds.). Myth and Philosophy. Albany: State University of New York Press. ISBN 0-7914-0417-X.
- Day, Terence P. (1982). The Conception of Punishment in Early Indian Literature. Ontario: Wilfrid Laurier University Press. ISBN 0-919812-15-5.
- Heckaman, C. (1979). Toward a Comprehensive Understanding of Rta in the Rg Veda (Master's Thesis). McMaster University.
- Holdrege, Barbara A. (2004). "Dharma". In Mittal, S.; Thursby, G. (eds.). The Hindu World. New York: Routledge. pp. 213–248. ISBN 0-415-21527-7.
- James, Edwin O. (1969). Creation and Cosmology: A Historical and Comparative Inquiry. Leiden: E. J. Brill.
- Kapur-Fic, Alexandra R. (1998). Thailand: Buddhism, Society and Women. New Delhi: Abhinav Publications. ISBN 81-701-7360-4.
- Leslie, Julia (1992). Roles and Rituals for Hindu Women. Bangalore: Motilal Banarsidass. ISBN 81-208-1036-8.
- Mahadevan, T. M. P. (2000). Upaniṣads. Bangalore: Motilal Banarsidass. ISBN 81-208-1611-0.
- Mahony, William K. (1998). The Artful Universe: An Introduction to the Vedic Religious Imagination. Albany: State University of New York Press. ISBN 0-7914-3580-6.
- Monier-Williams, Monier (1976) [1899]. A Sanskrit-English Dictionary. Oxford: Clarendon Press.
- Myers, Michael W. (2001). Brahman: A Comparative Theology. Surrey: Curzon Press. ISBN 0-7007-1257-7.
- Neufeldt, Ronald W. (1986). Karma and Rebirth: Post Classical Developments. Albany: State University of New York Press. ISBN 0-87395-990-6.
- Oldenberg, Hermann (1894). Die Religion des Veda. Berlin: Verlag von Wilhelm Hertz.
- Panikkar, Raimundo (2001). The Vedic Experience: Mantramañjari. Bangalore: Motilal Banarsidass. ISBN 81-208-1280-8.
- Premnath, D. N. (1994). "The Concepts of Ṛta and Maat: A Study in Comparison". Biblical Interpretation. 2 (3): 325–339. doi:10.1163/156851594X00123.
- Ramakrishna, G. (1965). Origin and Growth of the Concept of Ṛta in Vedic Literature (Doctoral Dissertation). University of Mysore.
- Rappaport, Roy A. (2002). Ritual and Religion in the Making of Humanity. Cambridge: Cambridge University Press. ISBN 0-521-22873-5.
- Rukmani, T. S. (2008). "Value Ethics in the Early Unapishads: A Hermeneutic Approach". In Sharma, A; Sherma, R. (eds.). Hermeneutics and Hindu Thought: Towards a Fusion of Horizons. Springer Publications. ISBN 978-1-4020-8191-0.
- Sharma, K.N. (1 March 1990). "Varna and Jati in Indian Traditional Perspective". Sociological Bulletin. 39 (1–2). Sage Publication, Inc.: 15–31. doi:10.1177/0038022919900102. JSTOR 23634524. S2CID 151534129.
- Thieme, Paul (1960). "The 'Aryan' Gods of the Mitanni Treaties". Journal of the American Oriental Society. 80 (4): 308. doi:10.2307/595878. JSTOR 595878.
- Watkins, Calvert (2000). The American Heritage Dictionary of Indo-European Roots (2nd ed.). Boston: Houghton Mifflin. ISBN 0-618-08250-6.
