= Indo-Aryan superstrate in Mitanni =

Aspect of Indo-Aryan language

- Mitanni-Aryan
- Native to: Mitanni
- Region: Upper Mesopotamia
- Ethnicity: Indo-Aryan peoples of Mitanni
- Extinct: after 1300s BC
- Language family: Indo-European: Indo-Iranian; Indo-Aryan; Indo-Aryan superstrate in Mitanni
- Writing system: Cuneiform

Language codes
- ISO 639-3: None (mis)
- Glottolog: None
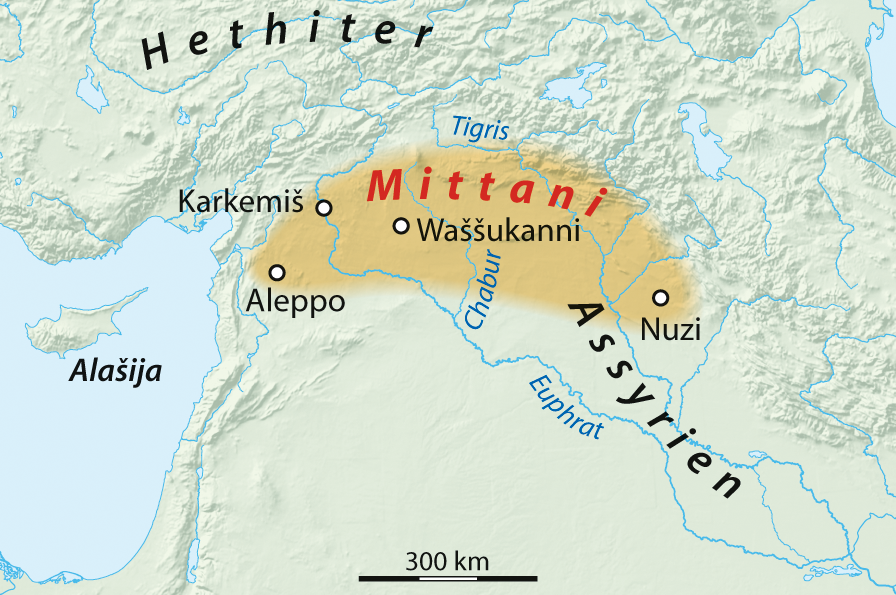
- Map of the Mittani kingdom, showing the capital and other cities.

The ancient Middle Eastern state of Mitanni (modern-day Northeast Syria, Southeastern Turkey, 2nd millennium BCE) used a dialect of Hurrian as its main language. This dialect however contains some loanwords of evidently Indo-Aryan origin, i.e. related to the parent of Sanskrit, the ancestor of many modern languages of the Indian subcontinent. The loaned vocabulary seems to be related to an elite group in Mitanni society, as they appear in the names of rulers and gods as well as in relation to horse-breeding and the military (thus forming a so-called superstrate).

It is thus generally believed that Indo-Aryan peoples settled in Upper Mesopotamia and northern Syria, and established the kingdom of Mitanni following a period of political vacuum, while also adopting Hurrian. This is considered a part of the Indo-Aryan migrations.

== Linguistic context ==
Some personal names of deities, proper names, and other terminology of the Late Bronze Age Mitanni civilisation of Upper Mesopotamia exhibit an Indo-Aryan superstrate. While what few written records left by the Mittani are either in Hurrian (which appears to have been the predominant language of their kingdom) or Akkadian (the main diplomatic language of the Late Bronze Age Near East), these apparently Indo-Aryan names suggest that an Indo-Aryan elite imposed itself over the Hurrians in the course of the Indo-Aryan expansion. If these traces are Indo-Aryan, they would be the earliest known direct evidence of Indo-Aryan, and would increase the precision in dating the split between the Indo-Aryan and Iranian languages (as the texts in which the apparent Indicisms occur can be dated with some accuracy).

Scholarship has reached a consensus that the linguistic data is most certainly affiliated to the Indo-Iranian language family, more specifically to Indo-Aryan. Professor Eva von Dassow concurs with the presence of Indo-Aryan terms in Mitanni vocabulary, but cautiously advises against the notion of an "Indo-Aryan takeover". Michael Witzel argues for the antiquity of the Indo-Aryan words attested in the Mitanni data, since they almost certainly predate linguistic developments attested in the Rigveda. In the same vein, German linguist Martin Joachim Kümmel divides the Indo-Aryan elements into WIA (Western Indo-Aryan) and (E)IA ((Eastern) Indo-Aryan), the latter "being slightly less archaic than WIA".

== Historical context ==
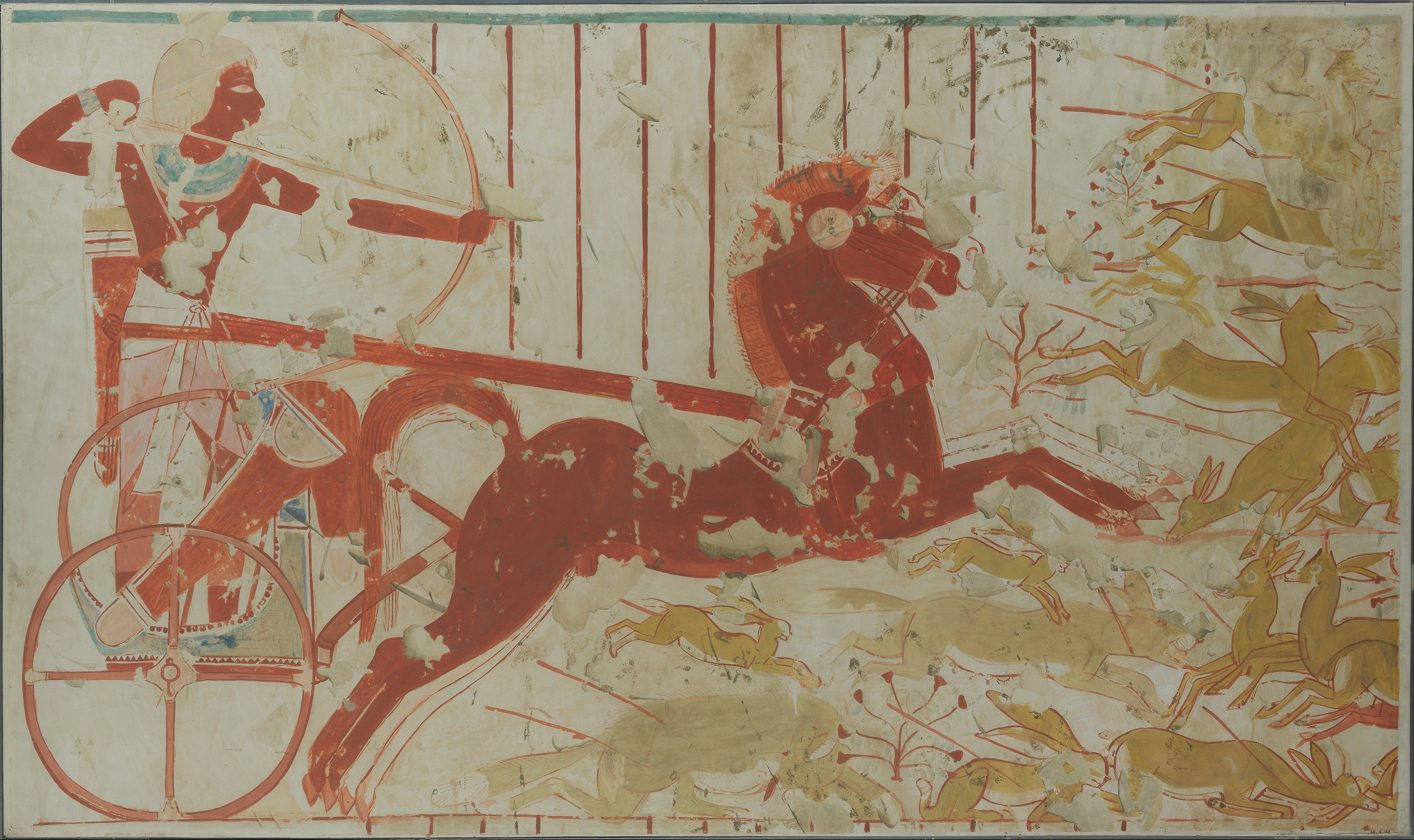
TT56, 18th Dynasty. Possible depiction of a Mitanni Maryannu (marya-nnu)

In a treaty between the Hittites and Mitanni (between Suppiluliuma I and Shattiwaza, c. 1380 BC), the deities Mitra, Varuna, Indra, and Nasatya (Ashvins) are invoked. Kikkuli's horse training text (circa 1400 BC) includes technical terms such as aika (Vedic Sanskrit eka, one), tera (tri, three), panza (pañca, five), satta (sapta, seven), na (nava, nine), vartana (vartana, round). The numeral aika "one" is of particular importance because it places the superstrate in the vicinity of Indo-Aryan proper (Vedic Sanskrit eka, with regular contraction of /ai/ to [eː]) as opposed to Indo-Iranian or early Iranian (which has *aiva; compare Vedic eva "only") in general.

The Mitanni warriors were called marya (Hurrian: maria-nnu), the term for "(young) warrior" in Sanskrit as well, formed by adding the Hurrian suffix -nnu; note mišta-nnu (= miẓḍha,~ Sanskrit mīḍha) "payment (for catching a fugitive)", as well as Greek μίσθιος, "hired man, mercenary" .

== Attested words and comparisons ==
All of the following examples are from Witzel (2001). For the pronunciation of the sounds transcribed from cuneiform as š and z, see Akkadian language § Consonants and Proto-Semitic language § Fricatives.

=== Names of people ===
Transcription of cuneiform	Interpretation	Vedic equivalent	Comments
bi-ir-ya-ma-aš-da	Priyamazdha	Priyamedha	"whose wisdom is dear"; /azd(ʰ)/ to [eːd(ʰ)] is a regular development in Vedic and its descendants (Indo-Aryan in the narrow sense)
bi-ir-ya-aš-šu-wa, bi-ir-da-aš-šu-wa	Priyāśva ~ Prītāśva	Prītāśva	"whose horse is dear"
ar-ta-aš-šu-ma-ra	Artasmara	Ṛtasmara	"who thinks of Arta/Ṛta"
ar-ta-ta-a-ma	Artadhāma(n?)	Ṛtadhāman	"his abode is Ṛta"
tu-uš-rat-ta, tu-iš-e-rat-ta, tu-uš-e-rat-ta	Tvaiša(?)ratha	Tveṣáratha	"whose chariot is vehement"
in-tar-ú-da, en-dar-ú-ta	Indrauta	Indrota	"helped by Indra"; /au/ to [oː] is a regular development in Vedic; ú specifically indicates [u] as opposed to [o]
	Citrarata	Citraratha	"whose chariot is shining",
	Indaruda/Endaruta	Indrota	"helped by Indra",
	Shativaza (šattiṷaza)	Sātivāja	"winning the race prize",
	Šubandu	Subandhu	"having good relatives" (a name in Palestine),

=== Names of deities ===
From treaties of Mitanni.

Transcription of cuneiform	Interpretation	Vedic equivalent	Comments
a-ru-na, ú-ru-wa-na	Varuna	Varuna	
mi-it-ra	Mitra	Mitra	
in-tar, in-da-ra	Indra	Indra	
na-ša-ti-ya-an-na	Nasatya(-nna)	Nasatya	Hurrian grammatical ending -nna
a-ak-ni-iš	Āgnis	Agni	only attested in Hittite, which retains nominative -/s/ and lengthens stressed syllables

=== Horse training ===
From Kikkuli.

Transcription of cuneiform	Interpretation	Vedic equivalent	Comments
a-aš-šu-uš-ša-an-ni	āśva-san-ni?	aśva-sana-	"master horse trainer" (Kikkuli himself)
-aš-šu-wa	-aśva	aśva	"horse"; in personal names
a-i-ka-	aika-	eka	"1"
ti-e-ra-	tera- ?	tri	"3"
pa-an-za-	pańća- ?	pañca	"5";
ša-at-ta	satta	sapta	"7"; /pt/ to /tː/ is either an innovation in Mitanni or a misinterpretation by a scribe who had Hurrian šinti "7" in mind
na-a-[w]a-	nāva-	nava	"9"
wa-ar-ta-an-na	vartan(n)a	vartana	round, turn

=== Other lexicon ===
A document from Nuzi has babru(-nnu) (babhru, brown), parita(-nnu) (palita, grey), and pinkara(-nnu) (pingala, red) for horse colours. Their chief festival was the celebration of the solstice which was common in most cultures in the ancient world.

The following table includes the remaining lexicon, considered to attest horse colours.

Transcription of cuneiform	Interpretation	Vedic equivalent	Comments
ba-ab-ru-un-nu	papru-nnu or babru-nnu	babhrú-	'brown'
pi_{2}-in-ka_{4}-ra-an-nu	pinkara-nnu or bingara-nnu	piṅgalá-	'reddish brown'
pa_{2}-ri-it-ta-an-nu	paritta-nnu or baritta-nnu	palitá-	'gray'

== See also ==
- Kikkuli
- Sindoi
- Substratum in Vedic Sanskrit
- Maryannu
- Mitanni
- Gutian language
- Washukanni

== Sources ==
- Dassow, Eva von (2014). "Levantine Polities under Mittanian Hegemony". In Eva Cancik-Kirschbaum; Nicole Brisch & Jesper Eidem (eds.). Constituent, Confederate, and Conquered Space: The Emergence of the Mittani State. Berlin, Boston: De Gruyter. pp. 11–32. doi:10.1515/9783110266412.11. ISBN 9783110266412.
- Fournet, Arnaud (2010). "About the Mitanni Aryan gods". Journal of Indo-European Studies. 38 (1–2): 26–40. Archived from the original on 2023-06-24.
- Kümmel, Martin Joachim [in German] (2022). "Indo-Iranian". In Thomas Olander (ed.). The Indo-European Language Family: A Phylogenetic Perspective. Cambridge: Cambridge University Press. pp. 246–268. doi:10.1017/9781108758666.014. ISBN 9781108758666.
- Mallory, J. P (1997). "Kuro-Araxes Culture". Encyclopedia of Indo-European Culture. Chicago–London: Fitzroy Dearborn.
- Mayrhofer, Manfred (1982). "Welches Material aus dem Indo-arischen von Mitanni verbleibt für eine selektive Darstellung?". In E. Neu (ed.). Investigationes philologicae et comparativae: Gedenkschrift für Heinz Kronasser (in German). Wiesbaden: O. Harrassowitz. pp. 72–90.
- Mayrhofer, Manfred (1992). Etymologisches Wörterbuch des Altindoarischen [Etymological Dictionary of Old Indo-Aryan] (in German). Vol. I. Heidelberg: Carl Winter Universitätsverlag. ISBN 3-533-03826-2.
- Mayrhofer, Manfred (1998). Etymologisches Wörterbuch des Altindoarischen (in German). Vol. II. Heidelberg: Carl Winter Universitätsverlag.
- Mayrhofer, Manfred (2001). Etymologisches Wörterbuch des Altindoarischen (in German). Vol. III. Heidelberg: Carl Winter Universitätsverlag.
- Thieme, Paul (1960). "The 'Aryan' Gods of the Mitanni Treaties". Journal of the American Oriental Society. 80 (4): 301–17. doi:10.2307/595878. JSTOR 595878.
- Witzel, Michael (2001). "Autochthonous Aryans? The evidence from Old Indian and Iranian texts". Electronic Journal of Vedic Studies. 7 (3): 1–93. doi:10.11588/ejvs.2001.3.830.
- Sigfried J. de Laet, ed. (1996). History of Humanity: From the Third Millennium to the Seventh Century B.C. UNESCO Publishing. ISBN 978-92-3-102811-3.
- Beckwith, Christopher I. (2009). Empires of the Silk Road: A History of Central Eurasia from the Bronze Age to the Present. Princeton University Press. ISBN 978-0-691-13589-2.
- Bryce, Trevor (2005). The Kingdom of the Hittites. Oxford University Press. ISBN 978-0-19-927908-1.
