= Gilukhipa =

Ancient Egyptian queen, Princess of Mitanni

Queen consort of Egypt
- Tenure: c. 1380 BC
- Pharaoh: Amenhotep III
- Spouse: Amenhotep III
- Father: Shuttarna II

Gilukhipa in hieroglyphs
k y r g y pA B1
Kirgipa (kyrgypɜ)
The sun goddess Hepa is my strength

Gilukhipa, or more probable Kilu-Hepa in the Hurrian language, in the Egyptian language Kirgipa (fl. c. 1380 BC), was the daughter of Shuttarna II, king of Mitanni. She was the sister of Artashumara and Tushratta.

== Biography ==
For political reasons, Gilukhipa was sent to Egypt to marry Amenhotep III. The Egyptian pharaoh made a special issue of commemorative scarabs on the occasion of his marriage to Gilukhipa in his 10th regnal year around 1380 BC, where he recorded that the princess was escorted by 317 ladies-in-waiting, women from the Mitanni king's royal palace. Gilukhipa became a "King's Wife," but secondary to Amenhotep III's chief wife, Tiye.

Around 26 years later, her niece Tadukhipa also became Amenhotep III's wife.
