= Artashumara =

14th-century BCE king of Mitanni

King of Mitanni
- Reign: c. 1380 – c. 1358 BC
- Predecessor: Shuttarna II
- Successor: Tushratta
- Died: c. 1358 BC
- Cause of death: Assassination
- Father: Shuttarna II

Artashumara (Mitanni Aryan: Artasmara; Akkadian: Artašumara; died c. 1358 BC) was a ruler who succeeded his father Shuttarna II as the king of Mitanni in the 14th century BC. He was a brother of Tushratta and Gilukhipa. He was assassinated by a pro-Hittite group led by Tuhi, who declared himself as a regent after placing Tushratta on the throne. Tuhi was later executed by Tushratta.

== Name ==
The name Artašumara is the Akkadian form of the Mitanni Aryan name Artasmara, which is a cognate of the Vedic Sanskrit term ऋतस्मर (Ṛta-smara), meaning "he remembers Ṛta".

== Reign ==
He is known only from a single mention in a tablet found in Tell Brak that refers to him as "Artassumara the king, son of Shuttarna the king" and a mention in Amarna letter 17. According to the letter, after the death of Shuttarna II, he briefly took power but was later assassinated.

== See also ==
- Mitanni

Preceded by Shuttarna II	King of Mitanni c. 1380 – c. 1358 BC	Succeeded by Tushratta
