= Shuttarna II =

King of Mitanni
- Reign: c. 1400 – c. 1380 BC
- Predecessor: Artatama I
- Successor: Artashumara
- Died: c. 1380 BC
- Issue: Artashumara; Tushratta; Gilukhipa

Shuttarna II (or Šuttarna; died c. 1380 BC) was a king of the Hurrian kingdom of Mitanni in the early 14th century BC.

== Family ==
Shuttarna II was the successor and probably a son of Artatama I.

He was succeeded by his sons Artashumara, under dubious circumstances, then Tushratta.

== Reign ==
During the reign of Shuttarna, Mitanni reached its height of power and prosperity. From Alalakh in the west, Mitanni shared its border with Egypt in northern Syria, approximately by the Orontes River. Two tablets sealed by Shuttarna were found at Tall Bazi on the Euphrates River. Other tablets sealed by him were found at Alalakh, Tell Brak, Nuzi, and Umm el-Marra. The heart of the kingdom was in the Khabur River basin where the capital Washshukanni was situated. Assyria as well as Arrapḫa in the east were vassal kingdoms of Mitanni. The Hittites attempted to invade the northern border lands of Mitanni, but were defeated by Shuttarna.

=== Egypt ===
He was an ally of the Egyptian Pharaoh Amenhotep III and the diplomatic dealings of the kings are briefly recorded in the Amarna letters EA#182, EA#183 and EA#184. Shuttarna's daughter Gilukhipa (sometimes spelled Gilukhepa) was given to Amenhotep III in marriage to seal the alliance between the two royal houses in the Pharaoh's 10th regnal year, taking with her a great dowry.

Preceded by Artatama I	King of Mitanni c. 1400 – c. 1380 BC	Succeeded by Artashumara
