= Shattuara II =

Shattuara II, also spelled Šattuara II, was the last known king of the Hurrian kingdom of Mitanni (Hanigalbat) in the thirteenth century BC, before the Assyrian conquest.

== Reign ==
A king named Shattuara is suggested to have ruled Hanigalbat during the reign of the Assyrian king Shalmaneser I (1263-1233 BC). In an Assyrian inscription, King Shattuara of Hanigalbat is said to have waged war against Shalmaneser I.

== See also ==
- Mitanni

Preceded by Wasashatta	Mitanni king 13th century BC	Succeeded by None
