= Shuttarna III =

14th-century BCE king of Mitanni

King of Mitanni
- Reign: 1345+ BC
- Predecessor: Tushratta (assassinated)
- Successor: Shattiwaza
- Father: Artatama II (pretender)

Shuttarna III was an usurper to the throne of Mitanni who reigned for a short period in the late 14th century BC.

== Reign ==
He was the son of Artatama II, a usurper to the throne of Tushratta.

=== Conquest of Carchemish ===
In 1345 BC, the conquest of Carchemish by Suppiluliuma I led to the assassination of Tushratta of Mitanni, marking the end of the Mitanni Empire. In a civil war of succession, Shuttarna III usurped the throne, while Shattiwaza fled to Suppiluliuma I of the Hittites in the west.

=== War of Succession ===
In the East, Shuttarna III sought the support of Ashur-uballit I of Assyria (r. 1353-1318 BC). However, he was defeated when a Hittite army marched towards the capital and installed Shattiwaza on the throne. The events are described in the Shattiwaza Treaty (CTH 51+52).

In the south, Burnaburiash II of Karduniash (Babylon; 1359-1333 BC) remained neutral in the rivalry between Hatti and Assyria for the remains of Mitanni.

== See also ==
- Mitanni

Preceded by Artatama II	Mitanni king late 14th century BC	Succeeded by Shattiwaza
