= Artatama I =

King of Mitanni
- Reign: c. 1423 – c. 1400 BC
- Successor: Shuttarna II
- Died: c. 1400 BC
- Issue: 1 daughter
- Father: Shaushtatar

Artatama I (died c. 1400 BC) was a king of the Hurrian kingdom of Mitanni in the late 15th century BC. His reign coincided with the reigns of Egyptian pharaohs Amenhotep II and Thutmose IV. He is believed to be the son of earlier Mitanni king Shaushtatar.

A tablet of Artatama I was found at Tall Bazi granting land. Tablets were also found at Alalakh. Artatama I is referred to in the Amarna letters (EA 29) as the grandfather of Tushratta and father of Shuttarna II, who established an alliance with Thutmose IV of Egypt. Facing the perils of fighting a war on two fronts, the Hittites in the north and Egypt in the south, Artatama I approached Amenhotep II with an offer of peaceful division of contested lands in Syria. A peaceful resolution of an old conflict could grow into an alliance, but Egypt suspected foul play and denied a definite answer for years. At one point during the reign of Thutmose IV they proposed a marriage between Thutmose and Artatama I's daughter, but for unknown reasons Artatama I rejected the offer. Egypt had to make seven consecutive marriage proposals before Artatama I finally agreed. Thus, Artatama I may have been the father of Queen Mutemwiya and the maternal grandfather of Amenhotep III. Artatama I was succeeded by Shuttarna II who was probably his son.

He is mentioned in the later Šattiwaza treaty between the Hittite king Šuppiluliuma I and Mitanni vassal king Shattiwaza, for example "When king Tušratta died, the Storm-god decided the legal case of Artatama: his son (= Šuttarna) brought the dead Artatama back to life."

== Notes ==
Preceded by	King of Mitanni c. 1423 – c. 1400 BC	Succeeded by Shuttarna II
