= Kirta =

Mitanni king

Kirta was a legendary Hurrian king in Mesopotamia. He lived c. 1500 BC and is traditionally thought to have founded the dynasty of Mitanni, though epigraphic support for that is thin. A seal was found reading "Šuttarna, son of Kirta, king of Maitani." He may have reigned around 1540 BC as per middle chronology.

== See also ==
- Mitanni
- Legend of Keret

| Preceded by founder of the Mitanni kingdom | Mitanni king fl. 1540 BC | Succeeded by Shuttarna I |
