= Baratarna =

Parštatar
- King of Mitanni

King of Mitanni
- Predecessor: Founder
- Successor: Shaushtatar
- Died: c. 1470 BC

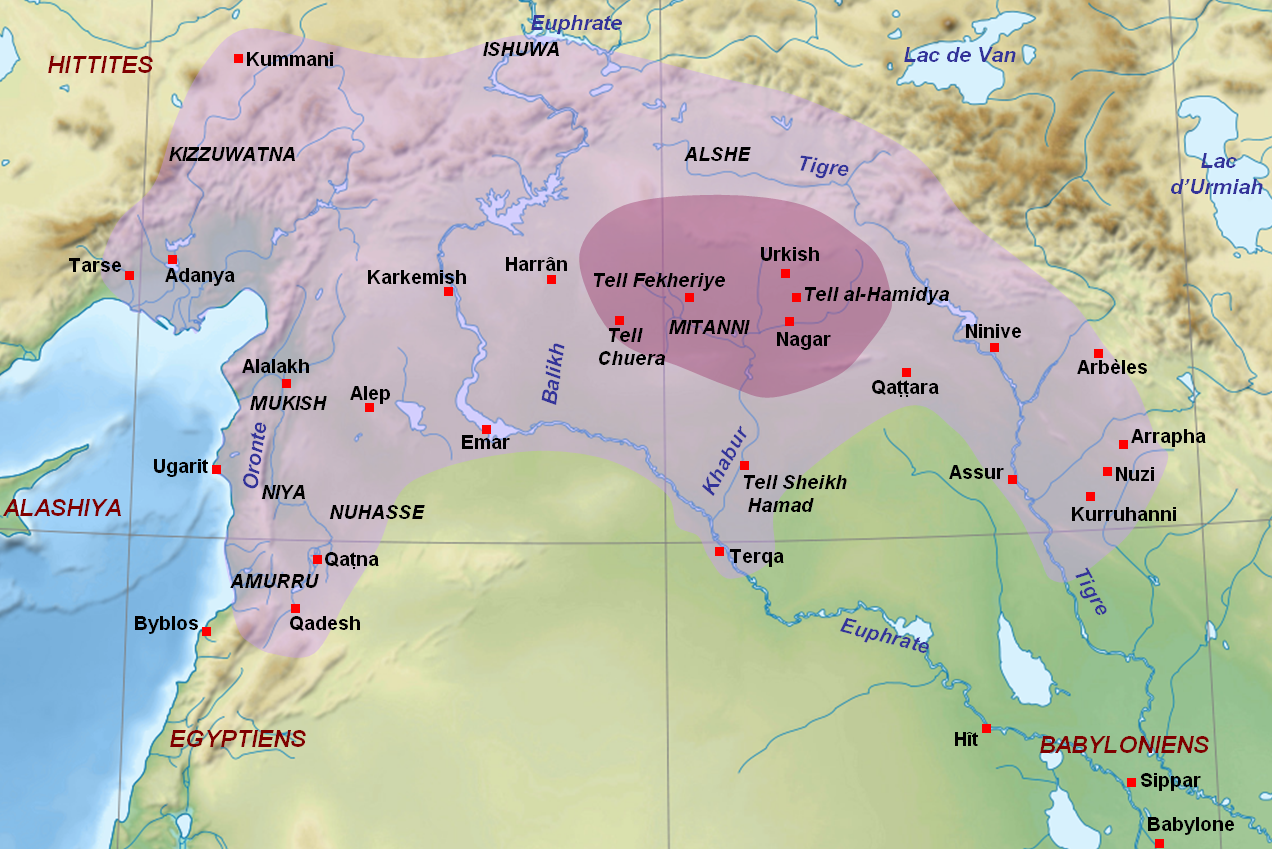
A map of the Mitanni kingdom. This extent was likely reached during the reign of Barattarna

Barattarna, Parattarna, Paršatar, or Parshatatar is the first known King of Mitanni and is considered to have reigned, as per middle chronology between c. 1510 and 1490 BC by J. A. Belmonte-Marin quoting H. Klengel. He is also said to have ruled during the peak of Mitanni, and during its greatest extent.

== Reign ==
Very few records of him are known as sources from Mitanni are rare. Most information we have about the kingdom, especially its early history and kings come from records outside of the state. Dates for the kings can be deduced by comparing the chronology of Mitanni and other states, especially ancient Egypt, at a later date and working back the figures. Information is found in the biography of Idrimi of Alalakh (or Alalah, which became the capital of Aleppo). Barattarna conquered the area and made Idrimi his vassal, Idrimi becoming king of Aleppo according to a treaty that also declared Pilliya, the king of Kizzuwatna, his vassal. Mitanni in his time probably extended as far as Arrapḫa in the east, Terqa in the south, and Kizzuwatna in the West. Barattarna may have been the Mitannian king the Egyptian Pharaoh Thutmosis I met at the Euphrates River in a campaign early in his reign (around 1493).

=== Kizzuwatna ===
Pilliya, the king of Kizzuwatna, apparently signed a treaty with Idrimi and became a vassal of the Mitanni Empire. He is also known to have entered peace with Zidanta II of Hatti.

=== Death ===
Information about his death is mentioned in a record from Nuzi dated to the death of king Barattarna, possibly around 1420, as per short chronology.

== Alternative views ==
Several scholars disagree with the views as expressed above. For example, according to Eva von Dassow (2022), “Barattarna/Parattarna” and “Paršatar/Parshatatar” of Mitanni are two different kings. Furthermore there are two kings named as “Barattarna/Parattarna”.

In the chart accompanying her article (p.471), von Dassow gives the following sequence of the kings of Mitanni.

Parattarna I, Parsatatar, Saustatar, Saitarna, Parattarna II

In her chart, the start of Parattarna I’s rule is associated with Idrimi of Alalakh, and the start of Saustatar’s rule is associated with his son Niqmepa. Additionally, Kingdom of Ḫana ruler at Terqa Qis-Addu is shown to have ruled at the time of three Mitanni kings, Saustatar, Saitarna, and Parattarna II.

== See also ==
- Mitanni

Preceded by Shuttarna I	Mitanni king 15th century BC	Succeeded by Shaushtatar
