= Artatama II =

King of Mitanni
- Reign: c. 1335 – c. 1333 BC
- Predecessor: Tushratta
- Successor: Shuttarna III
- Died: c. 1333 BC
- Issue: Shuttarna III

Artatama II (died c. 1333 BC) was a brief usurper to the throne of king Tushratta of Mitanni in the 14th century BC. He may have been a brother of Tushratta or belonged to a rival line of the royal house. His son, Shuttarna III, ruled Mitanni after him.

Preceded by Tushratta	King of Mitanni c. 1335 – c. 1333 BC	Succeeded by Shuttarna III
