= Shaushtatar =

King of Mitanni
- Reign: c. 1465 – c. 1450 BC
- Predecessor: Baratarna
- Died: c. 1450 BC
- Issue: Artatama I
- Father: Baratarna

Šauštatar (also spelled Shaushtatar; died c. 1450 BC) was the King of Mitanni in the 15th century BC. He significantly expanded Mitanni to include Assyria and Nuzi in the east to Mukish and Kizzuwatna in the west. He was in conflict with Thutmose III competing for territory in Syria.

== Attestations ==
The royal seal of king Shaushtatar

Two tablets of Shaushtatar (AIT 13 and AIT 14), legal decisions, were found at Alalakh. They mention Niqmepa, the king of Mukish, providing a synchronism. A tablet of Shaushtatar was found at Tall Bazi, granting land.

== Name ==
The Hurrian word šauša means "big, great" and the theonym Šauša referred to the local version of the great goddess Ištar.

== Reign ==
Shaushtatar was the son and successor of Baratarna. By the time he ascended the throne, his father had installed Hurrian client kings in a number of cities, making it easier for Shaushtatar to make Mittani a Mesopotamian power.

=== Invasion of Assyria ===
Now freed from the constant threat undergone by Mitanni of the Egyptians, Shaushtatar turned his attention toward Assyria. He invaded Assyria and sacked and looted its capital, Assur.

=== Later Battles ===
After his invasion of Assyria, Shaushtatar turned his army westward across the Euphrates River, along the way gathering beneath his sway all the northern Syrian states as he brought his army to the coast of the Mediterranean Sea. He succeeded in making Mukish, Nuzi, Assur, and Kizzuwatna vassals of Mitanni. He was looking to extend Mitanni's power further south, perhaps into Palestine. However, much of southern Syria still lay within the Egyptian sphere of influence, which had long been a threat to Mitanni.

There was a consequence into Shaushtatar's expansion into Palestine: war with Egypt. Despite Mitanni's advantage that Palestine had a significant Hurrian population at the time, the war would be difficult to win. During the planning stages, however, Shaushtatar died, and his son Artatama I would negotiate with pharaoh Amenhotep II over an alliance.

Preceded by Baratarna	King of Mitanni c. 1465 – c. 1450 BC	Succeeded by
