= Shattuara =

King of Mitanni
- Reign: c. 1320 BC (high) c. 1305 BC (low)
- Predecessor: Shattiwaza
- Successor: Wasashatta

Shattuara, also spelled Šattuara, was a king of the Hurrian kingdom of Mittani c. 1305-1285 BC.

Mitanni under the Hittites focused on the northern Khabur region, while the Assyrians focused on the middle Euphrates region with Hanigalbat.

== Reign ==
=== Assyrian period ===
Adad-Nirari I: Shattuara became a vassal of the Assyrian king Adad-nirari I in 1263 BC, after the latter defeated him. In an inscription made by Adad-nirari I, he is said to have rebelled against his lord, but was captured and his oath of loyalty was renewed.

Shalmaneser I: A later king also called Shattuara is suggested to have ruled Hanigalbat during the reign of the Assyrian king Shalmaneser I (1263-1233 BC). In an Assyrian inscription, King Shattuara of Hanigalbat is said to have waged war against Shalmaneser I. However, it seems more likely this event is a recapitulation of the revolt against Adad-nirari I, either by Shattuara or his son Wasashatta.

== See also ==
- Mitanni

Preceded by Shattiwaza	vassal Mitanni king 14th-13th century BC	Succeeded by Wasashatta
