= Shuttarna I =

Mittani king

Shuttarna I was an early king of the Mitanni.

His name is recorded on a seal found at Alalakh. The inscription reads "son of Kirta" and is the only reference about this king yet discovered. He would have reigned at the end of 16th century BC (middle chronology).

== See also ==
- Mitanni

| Preceded by Kirta | Mitanni king end of 16th century BC | Succeeded by Parshatatar |
