= Wasashatta =

Wasashatta, also spelled Wasašatta, was a king of the Hurrian kingdom of Mittani ca. the early thirteenth century BC.

== Reign ==
Like his father Shattuara, Wasashatta was an Assyrian vassal. He revolted against his master Adad-nirari I (c. 1295-1263 BC (short chronology)) and sought help in vain from the Hittites. The Assyrians crushed his revolt and devastated Hanigalbat. The royal family was captured and brought to Assur and Wasashatta was never heard of again.

== See also ==
- Mitanni

Preceded by Shattuara	vassal Mitanni king 13th century BC	Succeeded by Shattuara II
