= Mitanni =

Ancient Hurrian-speaking state in northern Syria and southeast Anatolia

Kingdom of Mitanni
- c. 1600 BC – c. 1260 BC
- Kingdom of Mitanni at its greatest extent under Barattarna c. 1490 BC
- Capital: Washukanni
- Common languages: Hurrian; Akkadian; Amorite
- Religion: Hurrian religion; Ancient Mesopotamian religion
- Government: Monarchy
- King
  - c. 1540 BC: Kirta (first known)
  - c. 1260 BC: Shattuara II (last)
- Historical era: Bronze Age
  - Established: c. 1600 BC
  - Disestablished: c. 1260 BC
Preceded by	Succeeded by
Hittite Empire; Yamhad	Middle Assyrian Empire

Mitanni or Mittani (c. 1550–1260 BC), (Note: /mɪˈtæni/: Hittite: 𒆳𒌷𒈪𒋫𒀭𒉌, romanized: KUR ^{URU}Mi-ta-an-ni; Mittani or Hittite: 𒈪𒀉𒋫𒉌, romanized: Mi-it-ta-ni) earlier called Ḫabigalbat in old Babylonian texts, c. 1600 BC; Ḫanigalbat or Ḫani-Rabbat in Assyrian records, (Note: Hanikalbat, Khanigalbat, Akkadian: 𒄩𒉌𒃲𒁁, romanized: Ḫa-ni-gal-bat, Ḫa-ni-rab-bat) or Naharin in Egyptian and some Akkadian texts, was a Hurrian-speaking kingdom in northern Syria and southeast Anatolia (modern-day Turkey) with Indo-Aryan linguistic and political influences. (Note: See § Indo-Aryan influences for the debate regarding the extent of Indo-Aryan influence over Mitanni.) Since no histories, royal annals or chronicles have yet been found in its excavated sites, knowledge about Mitanni is sparse compared to the other powers in the area, and dependent on what its neighbours commented in their texts.

The Hurrians were in the region as of the late 3rd millennium BC. A king of Urkesh with a Hurrian name, Tupkish, was found on a clay sealing dated c. 2300 BC at Tell Mozan. The first recorded inscription of their language was of Tish-atal (c. 21st century BC), king of Urkesh. Later on, Hurrians made up the main population of Mitanni, which was firstly known as Ḫabigalbat, at Babylonia, in two texts of the late Old Babylonian period, during the reign of Ammi-Saduqa, (c. 1638–1618 BC), in low middle chronology.

The Mitanni Empire was a strong regional power limited by the Hittites to the north, Egyptians to the west, Kassites to the south, and later by the Assyrians to the east. At its maximum extent Mitanni ranged as far west as Kizzuwatna by the Taurus Mountains, Tunip in the south, Arrapḫa in the east, and north to Lake Van. Their sphere of influence is shown in Hurrian place names, personal names and the spread through Syria and the Levant of a distinct pottery type, Nuzi ware.

== Etymology ==
=== The name "Mitanni"/"Mittani" ===
G17 D38 V13 N35 N25
mꜥṯn(j)
in hieroglyphs
Era: New Kingdom
(1550–1069 BC)

The name of this state has been explained as a derivation with the Hurrian suffix -nni from a stem borrowed from Indo-Aryan, *maita- 'to unite', which is cognate with the Sanskrit verb mith (मिथ्; 'to unite, pair, couple, meet'). The name Maitanni thus would mean the 'united kingdom'.

Gernot Wilhelm has instead suggested that Maittan(n)i means 'of M(a)itta', the name of "an individual leader (or clan), and not a territory or population". This Maitta would be the dynasty's founder. Based on this linguistic analysis, the name of the kingdom is now usually written "Mittani" (Mitta/Maitta plus the Hurrian suffix -ni) instead of "Mitanni."

=== The name "Ḫanigalbat" ===
The Mitanni kingdom was firstly known as Ḫabingalbat before 1600 BC in Babylonia, during the reign of Ammi-Saduqa, attested as ḫa-bi-in-gal-ba-ti-i, and ḫa-bi-in-ga-al-ba-at, in two texts of the late Old Babylonian period. Egyptians referred to it as Naharin and Mitanni, it was Ḫurri to the Hittites, and Ḫanigalbat or Ḫani-Rabbat to the Assyrians. These names seem to have referred to the same kingdom and were often used interchangeably, according to Michael C. Astour. Hittite annals mention a people called Hurri (Ḫu-ur-ri), located in northeastern Syria. A Hittite fragment, probably from the time of Mursili I, mentions a "King of the Hurri," and the Assyro-Akkadian version of the text renders "Hurri" as Hanigalbat. Tushratta, who styles himself "king of Mitanni" in his Akkadian Amarna letters, refers to his kingdom as Hanigalbat.

The earliest attestation of the term Ḫanigalbat can be read in Akkadian, along with the Hittite version mentioning "the Hurrian enemy," in a copy from the 13th century BC of the "Annals of Ḫattušili I," who possibly reigned after 1630 BC.

The reading of the Assyrian term Ḫanigalbat has a history of multiple renderings. The first portion has been connected to, "𒄩𒉡 Ḫa-nu," "Hanu" or "Hana," first attested in Mari to describe nomadic inhabitants along the southern shore of the northern Euphrates region, near the vicinity of Terqa (capital of the Kingdom of Ḫana) and the Khabur River. The term developed into more than just a designation for a people group, but also took on a topographic aspect as well. In the Middle Assyrian period, a phrase "𒌷𒆳𒄩𒉡𒀭𒋫" "^{URU}KUR Ḫa-nu AN.TA," "cities of the Upper Hanu" has suggested that there was a distinction between two different Hanu's, likely across each side of the river. This northern side designation spans much of the core territory of Mitanni state.

The two signs that have led to variant readings are "𒃲 gal" and its alternative form "𒆗 gal_{9}". The first attempts at decipherment in the late 19th century rendered forms interpreting "gal," meaning "great" in Sumerian, as a Sumerogram for Akkadian "rab" having the same meaning; "Ḫani-Rabbat" denoting "the Great Hani". J. A. Knudtzon, and E. A. Speiser after him, supported instead the reading of "gal" on the basis of its alternative spelling with "gal_{9}", which has since become the majority view.

There is still a difficulty to explain the suffix "-bat" if the first sign did not end in "b," or the apparent similarity to the Semitic feminine ending "-at," if derived from a Hurrian word. More recently, in 2011, scholar Miguel Valério, then at the New University of Lisbon provided detailed support in favor of the older reading Hani-Rabbat. The re-reading makes an argument on the basis of frequency, where "gal" not "gal_{9}," is far more numerous; the later being the deviation found in six documents, all from the periphery of the Akkadian sphere of influence. It is additionally argued that although they are graphically distinct, there is a high degree of overlap between the two signs, as "gal_{9}" denotes "dannum" or "strong" opposed to "great", easily being used as synonyms. Both signs also represent correlative readings; alternative readings of "gal_{9}" include "rib" and "rip," just like "gal" being read as "rab."

The situation is complicated by there being, according to linguists, three separate dialects of Hurrian, central-western, northern, and eastern.

The Egyptians considered the Euphrates River to form the boundary between Syria and Naharain.

=== The name "Naharin" ===
Naharin, MdC transliteration nhrn, was the ancient Egyptian term for the kingdom of Mitanni during the 18th Dynasty of the New Kingdom of Egypt. The 18th dynasty was in conflict with the kingdom of Mitanni for control of the Levant from the reigns of Thutmose I, and Amenhotep II. Amenhotep II's son, Thutmose IV, would eventually make peace with the Mitannians. Henceforth, relations between Egypt and Naharin (Mitanni) were peaceful with much diplomatic gift giving according to the correspondence of the Amarna Letters, in which the name appears also in Akkadian. The military annals of pharaoh Thutmose III refer to Naharin in explicit terms. In his 33rd Year, Thutmose III records:

His Majesty travelled north capturing the towns and laying waste the settlements of that foe Naharin.

Inscriptions on two faces of the obelisk in Istanbul, originally erected at 15 century B.C. in the temple in Karnak, also mentions Thutmose III expanding Egypt's borders to and campaigning near Naharin (Mitanni).

== History ==
=== Early Kingdom ===
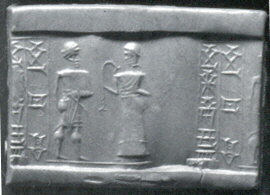
Cylinder seal, c. 16th–15th century BC, Mitanni

As early as Akkadian times, Hurrians are known to have lived east of the river Tigris on the northern rim of Mesopotamia, and in the Khabur Valley. The group which became Mitanni gradually moved south into Mesopotamia before the 17th century BC. It was already a powerful kingdom at the end of the 17th century or in the first half of the 16th century BC, and its beginnings date to well before the time of Thutmose I, to the time of the Hittite sovereigns Hattusili I and Mursili I.

Hurrians are mentioned in the private Nuzi texts, in Ugarit, and the Hittite archives in Hattusa (Boğazköy). Cuneiform texts from Mari mention rulers of city-states in upper Mesopotamia with both Amurru (Amorite) and Hurrian names. Rulers with Hurrian names are also attested for Urshum and Hassum, and tablets from Alalakh (layer VII, from the later part of the Old Babylonian period) mention people with Hurrian names at the mouth of the Orontes River. There is no evidence for any invasion from the North-east. Generally, these onomastic sources have been taken as evidence for a Hurrian expansion to the South and the West.

A Hittite fragment, probably from the time of Mursili I, mentions a "King of the Hurrians" (LUGAL ERÍN.MEŠ Hurri). This terminology was last used for King Tushratta of Mitanni, in a letter in the Amarna archives. The normal title of the king was 'King of the Hurri-men' (without the determinative KUR indicating a country).

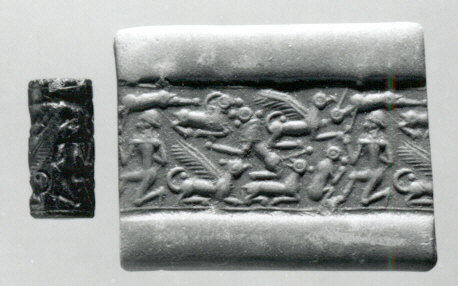
Cylinder seal and modern impression: nude male, griffins, monkey, lion, goat, c. 15th/14th century BC, Mitanni

The Egyptian official astronomer and clockmaker Amenemhet (Amen-hemet) apparently ordered to be written on his tomb that he returned from the "foreign country called Mtn (Mi-ti-ni)," but Alexandra von Lieven (2016) and Eva von Dassow (2022) consider that the expedition to Mitanni could have taken place in pharaoh Ahmose I's reign (c. 1550–1525 BC), actually by Amenemhet's father. During the reign of pharaoh Thutmose I (1506–1493 BC), the names Mitanni and Naharin are among the reminiscences of several of the pharaoh's officers. One of them, Ahmose si-Abina, wrote: "...His Majesty arrived at Naharin..." Another one, Ahmose pa-Nekhbit, recorded: "...when I captured for him in the land of Naharin..."

After the Battle of Megiddo, an officer of pharaoh Thutmose III (1479–1425 BC), in the pharaoh's 22 regnal year, reported: "That [wretched] enemy of Kadesh has come and has entered into Megiddo. He is [there] at this moment. He has gathered to him the princes of [every] foreign country [which had been] loyal to Egypt, as well as (those) as far as Naharin and M[itanni], them of Hurru, them of Kode, their horses, their armies." In several later military campaigns the Annals of Thutmose III mention Naharin, in particular those of his regnal years 33, 35, and 42. After that time, records become more available from local sources until the empire's end in the mid-13th century BC.

The first known use of Indo-Aryan names for Mitanni rulers begins with Shuttarna I, who succeeded his father Kirta on the throne. King Barattarna of Mitanni expanded the kingdom west to Aleppo and made the Amorite king Idrimi of Alalakh his vassal, and five generations seems to separate this king (also known as Parattarna) from the rise of Mitanni kingdom. The state of Kizzuwatna in the west also shifted its allegiance to Mitanni, and Assyria in the east had become largely a Mitannian vassal state by the mid-15th century BC. The nation grew stronger during the reign of Shaushtatar, but the Hurrians were keen to keep the Hittites inside the Anatolian highland. Kizzuwatna in the west and Ishuwa in the north were important allies against the hostile Hittites.

Mitanni's major rival was Egypt under the Thutmosids. However, with the ascent of the Hittite Empire, Mitanni and Egypt struck an alliance to protect their mutual interests from the threat of Hittite domination. After a few successful clashes with the Egyptians over the control of Syria, Mitanni sought peace with them, and an alliance was formed. During the reign of Shuttarna II, in the early 14th century BC, the relationship was very amicable, and he sent his daughter Gilu-Hepa to Egypt for marriage with Pharaoh Amenhotep III. Mitanni was now at its peak of power.

However, by the reign of the king of Assyria Eriba-Adad I (1390–1366 BC) Mitanni influence over Assyria was on the wane. Eriba-Adad I became involved in a dynastic battle between Tushratta and his brother Artatama II and after this his son Shuttarna III, who called himself king of the Hurri while seeking support from the Assyrians. A pro-Hurri/Assyria faction appeared at the royal Mitanni court. Eriba-Adad I had thus loosened Mitanni influence over Assyria, and in turn had now made Assyria an influence over Mitanni affairs. King Ashur-uballit I (1365–1330 BC) of Assyria attacked Shuttarna and annexed Mitanni territory in the middle of the 14th century BC, making Assyria once more a great power.

At the death of Shuttarna, Mitanni was ravaged by a war of succession. Eventually Tushratta, a son of Shuttarna, ascended the throne, but the kingdom had been weakened considerably and both the Hittite and Assyrian threats increased. At the same time, the diplomatic relationship with Egypt went cold, the Egyptians fearing the growing power of the Hittites and Assyrians. The Hittite king Suppiluliuma I invaded the Mitanni vassal states in northern Syria and replaced them with loyal subjects.

==== Great Syrian War ====
The War waged by Suppiluliuma on Tushrata's Mitanni was called 'the Great Syrian War'. The war goals were the Destruction of the Mitanni Heartlands and conquest of its Syrian vassal states. This included persuading Ugarit to join the side of Suppiluliuma. Mukish and Nuhašši retaliated against Ugarit, but once Suppiluliuma arrived, they were defeated by the Hittite-Ugaritic alliance, and Ugarit got a significant portion of their lands annexed to it. Suppiluliuma then crossed the Euphrates and sacking Washukanni, Tushrata escaping with some of his troops before the sack. After which Suppiluliuma turned back to Syria and subjugated Aleppo, Mukish, Niya, Arahtu, Qatna and Nuhašši. This campaign was fought in 1345 BC. A number of years later in 1327 BC Carchemish too was taken after a siege and Tushratta got murdered sometime after the war by Mitannians.

==== After the war ====
In the capital Washukanni, a new power struggle broke out. The Hittites and the Assyrians supported different pretenders to the throne. Finally a Hittite army conquered the capital Washukanni and installed Shattiwaza, the son of Tushratta, as their vassal king of Mitanni in the late 14th century BC. The kingdom had by now been reduced to the Khabur Valley. The Assyrians had not given up their claim on Mitanni, and in the 13th century BC, Shalmaneser I annexed the kingdom.

The Mitanni dynasty had ruled over the northern Euphrates-Tigris region between c. 1600 and 1350 BC, but succumbed to Hittite and later Assyrian attacks, and Mitanni was reduced to the status of a province of the Middle Assyrian Empire between c. 1350 and 1260 BC.

=== After the fall of Mitanni ===
With the final decline of the Mitanni Empire the western portions of its territory came under direct control of the Hittites and the eastern portions came under direct control of the Assyrians. The middle part continued on as the rump state of Hanigalbat. Eventually, under Shalmaneser I, that remaining part of the former Mitanni territory came under direct Assyrian control. This continued until the decline of Middle Assyrian power after the death of Tukulti-Ninurta I.

While under direct Assyrian control Hanigalbat was ruled by appointed governors such as the Assyrian grand-vizier Ilī-padâ, father of Ninurta-apal-Ekur (1191–1179), who took the title of King of Hanigalbat. He resided in the newly built (over an existing Mitanni tower and residence) Assyrian administrative centre at Tell Sabi Abyad.

The Babylonian Kings List A names the Assyrian ruler Sennacherib (705–681 BC) and his son Ashur-nadin-shumi (700–694) as being "Dynasty of Ḫabigal".

The name Hanigalbat was still in use as late as the later portion of the 1st millennium BC.

== Government and society ==
=== Royal Family ===
There is very little information about the Mitannian royal family: apart from the sovereigns, we know the names of a few sovereigns' fathers, whose status as kings is unknown, of a single queen, Yuni, wife of Tushratta (who corresponds directly to the Egyptian queen mother Tiye according to the Amarna letter EA 26), and of three princesses married to Egyptian kings (one whose name is unknown, who married Thutmose IV, Gilu-Heba, then Tadu-Heba who married Amenhotep III). The succession to the throne generally passed from father to son, but it is possible that this principle of succession was not the rule since other cases are attested (but in the minority). The dynastic principle is evident in the use of a dynastic seal, that of Shaushtatar, by the latter's successors up to Tushratta. The members of the royal family bore Hurrian names, and when they came to power, kings took an Indo-Aryan throne name. The Amarna letter EA 19 also indicates that Tushratta began the construction of a mausoleum (karašku) for his grandfather (Artatama) at this time, and requested gold from the king of Egypt for it.

The Amarna letter EA 25, a list (incomplete) of the dowry items of Princess Tadu-Heba, when she married Pharaoh Amenhotep III, is a major testimony of the wealth of the Mitannian royal family. It included scarves, tunics, dresses, boots, bed linens, necklaces, wrist and ankle bracelets, pendants, rings, earrings, as well as toiletry accessories such as a basin, mirrors, silver combs, also cups, fly whisks, spoons, and boxwood furniture. The bride also arrives accompanied by a chariot and horses, with their equipment, also luxurious, as it is an indispensable element of the pageantry of the royal elite of the time, and numerous weapons, therefore equipment for war and hunting.

=== Administration ===
The organization of the Mitanni kingdom is very poorly understood, even at its peak during the second half of the 15th century. Information must be gleaned from a small number of documents and is therefore limited.

The Mitannian kingdom appears to have been a sort of confederation dominated by the king of Mitanni, one of the "Great Kings" (Akkadian šarru rabu) of the Near East in the second half of the 2nd century (along with those of Ancient Egypt, Babylon, and the Hittites). He led a heterogeneous group of political entities, probably subject to various forms of domination. The kingdom includes provinces (ḫalṣu) administered directly and entrusted to governors (Hurrian ḫalzogli?), such as in Aleppo. It then includes vassal kingdoms, such as Alalakh and Arrapḫa. Some cities in the Middle Euphrates region were administered by communal institutions, with a kind of assembly of local notables (this is the case in Emar, Basiri, probably also in Ekalte and Azû) who dealt directly with the great king.

Relations between the Mitannian king and his vassals were hierarchical. The treaty between Idrimi of Alalakh and Pilliya of Kizzuwatna was placed under the patronage of King Barattarna, who therefore had an eye on the relations between his subordinates. The Mitannian king then intervened in the affairs of his vassals for certain important cases and arbitrations. The historical preamble to the treaty between Talmi-Sharruma of Aleppo and the Hittite king Muwatalli II mentions a redistribution of border lands by a king of Mitnani to Ashtata and Nuhašše at the expense of Aleppo following the latter's revolt. Mitannian dignitaries could make official requests to vassals, as indicated by several missives from Alalakh concerning legal disputes in which the Mitannian power intervened, for example over a man's property or to capture men and send them to the Mitannian authorities. Nuzi tablets on the relations between the local kingdom, Arrapḫa, and the Mitannian overlord show that they had to manage the issue of people from one kingdom when they resided or moved to the other. The Mitanni also levied tribute, but this is poorly documented. On the other hand, the Mitannian king granted land to his followers; two tablets from Tell Bazi thus record a royal donation of land to the Basiri people.

Official and private texts are mostly written in cuneiform Akkadian, a Semitic language traditionally used for writing in Syria and Upper Mesopotamia, although often mixed with Hurrian (the so-called "Hurro-Akkadian"). This language can also be used by the Mitannian administration. Despite the few official texts available, they appear relatively homogeneous within the Mitannian sphere, which could indicate a form of harmonization of scribal practices desired by the authorities.

=== Military organization ===
From a military perspective, the archives of Nuzi indicate that the Mitanni stationed troops among his vassals to ensure their protection, with them responsible for maintaining them. The Mitannian army received deliveries of barley, but also chariots manufactured in local workshops, some as contributions (iškaru). This was therefore more broadly a military support from the vassal to the overlord. We find texts on the administration of troops in the royal palace but also among the great families, who also participated in the war effort. These texts confirm the place occupied by war chariots on the battlefields of the Late Bronze Age, a phenomenon well documented in other kingdoms of the period, which explains the major role played by the social category of chariot drivers (maryannu). The infantrymen undoubtedly belonged to other social categories. The Nuzi texts indicate that the troops were organized into units of 10 and 50 men, led by officers. They also provide information on the fighters' equipment, also documented by excavations: the heavy armor of the charioteers, consisting of cuirasses covered with bronze plates, is distinguished from the lighter leather armor of the infantrymen. Shields, spears, swords, bows, arrows, and quivers are the most frequently mentioned weapons.

=== Social classes ===
The military power of the Mitanni rested on a warrior elite, the maryannu, specialized in the use of battle chariots. They are found throughout the Hurrian sphere of influence, since they are attested in the texts of Alalakh, of Nuzi (where they are rather called in Akkadian rākib narkabti, "chariot drivers") and also of Ugarit and of Qatna. They enjoy the highest position in society and often own important estates. This status seems to come with privileges, such as exemptions from corvées (but not everywhere). It is therefore the ruling elite and, in a way, the "nobility," characterized by its proximity to the king. This group seems nonetheless close to the rest of the population, since it is found in practically every documented village or hamlet.

The majority of the free population of the Mitanni-dominated countries, the common people, are referred to as ḫupšu, a term of Semitic origin that originally designated men subject to conscription. They appear mainly in the texts as peasants, infantrymen, and corvéables (Nuzi texts also use ālik ilki, "doer of (labor or military) service").

Texts from the kingdoms of Alalakh and Arrapḫa also document two other social groups. First, there are those called egelli, šūzubbu or nakkošše, occupational specialists such as charioteer or horse trainer. These are people who have skills demanded by the elite, for whom they fulfill obligations (and probably receive land in exchange). Then there are the impoverished free subjects, called aššabu ('residents') in Nuzi and ḫaniaḫḫe in Alalakh. This condition seems to be characterized by the absence of property, perhaps because of a loss of it. But they are still subject to conscription and state service.

The fact that these classes are found at both ends of the Mitanni-dominated lands could, according to E. von Dassow, indicate that this is a categorization desired by the dominant kingdom and imposed on its vassals. These categories are largely defined by the nature of their relationship to the administration and the services they can provide to it. This is particularly evident from census lists and troop rosters.

Some Mitannian subjects held the status of ḫanigalbatutu, "citizen of Hanigalbat," attested in texts from Alalakh, Umm el-Marra and Tell Brak. Although it does not seem to have been linked to that of maryannu, this was clearly an enviable position, since the Alalakh tablet shows a man (wrongly) claiming this status to exempt himself from the service of the local king. This political status was granted and confirmed by the king, who issued official sealed documents as proof. The tablets from Tell Brak and Umm el-Marra show that people with this status could obtain it from the king for their relatives, including in vassal countries, which indicates that the ḫanigalbatutu is not reserved only for natives of Hanigalbat.

== Indo-Aryan influences ==
A number of theonyms, proper names and glosses (technical terminology) of the Mitanni are of Indo-Aryan or Proto-Indo-Aryan origins. Starting from Shuttarna I who is the first Mitanni ruler historically attested to have existed, the Mitanni had Indo-Aryan throne names. The Kikkuli's horse training text includes technical terms of Indo-Aryan origin, and the Indo-Aryan deities Mitra, Varuna, Indra, and Nasatya (Ashvins) are listed and invoked in two treaties found in Hattusa, between the kings Sattiwaza of Mitanni and Šuppiluliuma I the Hittite: (treaty KBo I 3) and (treaty KBo I 1 and its duplicates). The toponym of the Mitanni capital of Washukanni is also "unanimously accepted" to have been derived from an Indo-Aryan dialect. Annelies Kammenhuber (1968) suggested that this vocabulary was derived from the still undivided Indo-Iranian language, but Mayrhofer has shown that specifically Indo-Aryan features are present.

It is generally believed that Indo-Aryan peoples settled in Upper Mesopotamia and northern Syria, and established the Kingdom of Mitanni following a period of political vacuum, while also adopting Hurrian. This is considered a part of the Indo-Aryan migrations. Since the late 20th century, the view that the Mitanni kingdom was ruled by a royal house and aristocracy of Indo-Aryan origin has been prevalent among scholars; (Note: Including Christopher I. Beckwith (2009), Pita Kelekna (2009), Asko Parpola (2015), Elena Efimovna Kuzmina (2007), Alexander Lubotsky (2023), Frans van Koppen (2017) and others) accordingly, a branch of the Indo-Aryans separated from the other Indo-Iranians around the turn of the second millennium BCE and migrated into West Asia, giving rise to the Mitanni kingdom, while also adopting the Hurrian language. Some recent studies, such as those by Eva von Dassow (2022) and Cotticelli-Kurras and Pisaniello (2023), while noting the modern identification of Mittani as Indo-Aryan and the role of Indo-Aryan speakers in establishing its dynasty, have disputed the significance of Indo-Aryan vocabulary in an otherwise Hurrian-speaking state, stating that it does not indicate any Indo-Aryan origins for Mitanni kings. William H. Stiebing Jr. (2016) similarly argues that, although it was once commonly accepted that the rulers of Mitanni were of Indo-Iranian origins, this view is no longer accepted by specialists today. The linguistic affinity of the royal names are now considered uncertain, and Mitanni was probably a Hurrian kingdom from the peasants to the ruling elite. According to Alexander Lubotsky (2023), however, the military elite of the Mitanni kingdom (see Maryannu) was of Aryan descent and their language displays a clear Indo-Aryan character.

Jasper Eidem in 2014 reported on Farouk Ismail's earlier study, in reference to the word marijannu that was found in a letter from Tell Leilan in northeastern Syria dating to a period slightly before 1761 BC, which is the time when the reign of Zimri-Lim ended in the region of Mari. Kroonen et al. (2018) consider this as an early Indo-Aryan linguistic presence in Syria two centuries prior to the formation of the Mitanni realm, as mariannu is generally seen as a Hurrianized form of the Indo-Aryan *marya, which means 'man' or 'youth', associated to military affairs and chariots.

== Archaeology ==
A concept known as "Dark Age" was applied, until recently, to the archaeological gap between the Middle and Late Bronze Age on Northern Mesopotamian sites, but Costanza Coppini considers it a "transition" instead, which can be called "Late Bronze Age 0," attested from the Tell Leilan's end caused by Samsu-iluna during his 23rd year of reign, c. 1728 BCE [Middle Chronology], to Mitanni's predominance (c. 1600–1550 BCE). These are the first traces of what, in the Late Bronze Age I, was Mitanni in historical terms, at the emergence of the third phase of Khabur ware.

The archaeological core zone of Mitanni is Upper Mesopotamia and the Trans-Tigridian region (Northeastern Iraq).

=== Upper Mesopotamia ===
Sites with Mitannian remains were found mainly in three regions of Upper Mesopotamia: Northeastern Syria Jazira Region, Northern Syria, and Southeastern Turkey (Upper Tigris).

==== Northeastern Syria (Jazira Region) ====
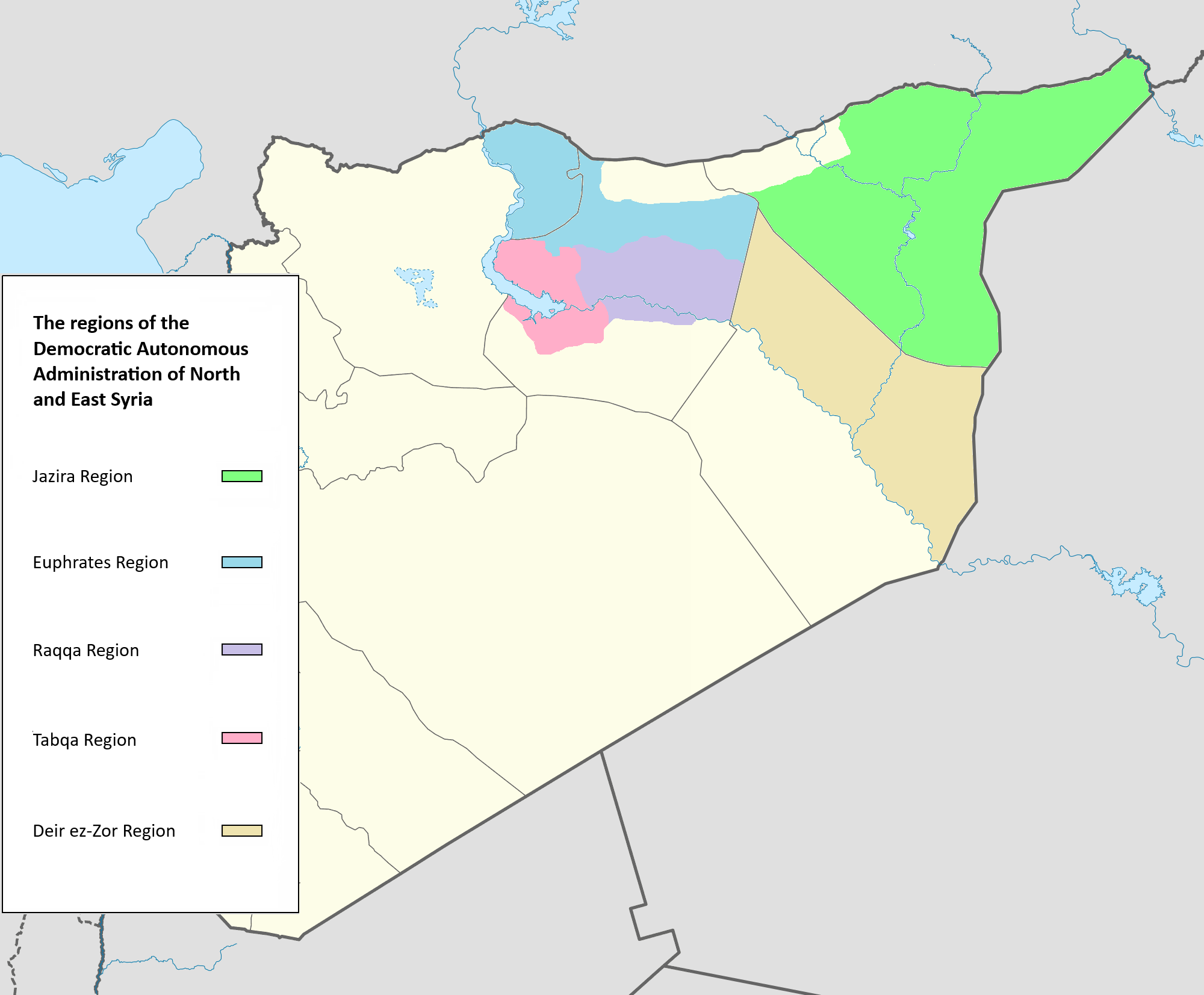
Jazira region in light green, Northeastern Syria.

Mitanni's first phase in Jazira Region features Late Khabur Ware from around 1600 to 1550 BC; this pottery was a continuity from the previous non-Mitannian Old Babylonian period. From around 1550 to 1270 BC, Painted Nuzi Ware (the most characteristic pottery in Mitanni times) developed as a contemporary to Younger Khabur Ware.

Mitanni had outposts centred on its capital, Washukanni, whose location has been determined by archaeologists to be on the headwaters of the Khabur River, most likely at the site of Tell Fekheriye as recent German archaeological excavations suggest. The city of Taite was also known to be a Mitanni "royal city" whose current location is unknown.

The major 3rd millennium urban center of Tell Brak which had dwindled to a minor settlement in Old Babylonian times, saw major development c. 1600 by the Mitanni. Monumental buildings including a palace and temple were constructed on the high ground and a 40 hectare lower town developed. The Mitanni occupation lasted until the site was destroyed (in two phases) between c. 1300 and 1275 BC, presumably by the Assyrians. Two Mitanni-era tablets were found during the modern excavation. One (TB 6002) mentioned "Artassumara the king, son of Shuttarna the king". Seventeen late period Mitanni tablets were found at Tall Al-Hamidiya.

==== Northern Syria ====
The oldest tablet issued by an unknown Mitannian king was found in the site of Tell Hammam et-Turkman, dated to c. 1500 BCE. Mitanni period occupation, between 1400 and 1200 BC (radiocarbon) was found at the site of Tell Bazi. Finds included a Mitanni cylinder seal and several ritual bowls. Two cuneiform tablets of the Mitanni period sealed by Mitanni ruler Saushtatar, one by Artatama I were also found. There is also a record of Mitanni governance at Tell Hadidi (Azu).

==== Southeastern Turkey (Upper Tigris) ====
The (2017) salvage excavations at the Ilısu Dam in the right bank of upper Tigris, southern Turkey, have shown a very early beginning of Mitanni period, as in the ruins of a temple in Müslümantepe, ritual artefacts and an early Mitannian cylinder seal were found, radiocarbon-dated to 1760–1610 BC. Archaeologist Eyyüp Ay, in his (2021) paper, describes the second phase of the temple as an "administrative center, which had craftsmen working in its workshops as well as farmers, gardeners and shepherds, [that] might have been ruled by a priest bound to a powerful Mitannian leader."

=== Trans-Tigridian region (Northeastern Iraq) ===
To the east of upper Tigris river, Trans-Tigridian region in northern Iraq, a site now called Bassetki was excavated, which in all likelihood was the ancient town of Mardama with Mitanni layers from 1550 to 1300 BC, as its Phase A9 (in trench T2) may alternatively represent a Middle Bronze/Late Bronze transitional, or Proto-Mitanni occupation within 16th century BC. In a subsequent excavation season, the deeper Phase A10 was identified as having a mix of Middle Bronze and Mitanni potteries, considered to be in the turn of the Middle to the Late Bronze Age transitional period (late 17th – early 16th century BC).

In 2010, the 3,400-year-old ruins of Kemune, a Bronze Age Mitanni palace on the banks of the Tigris in modern-day Iraqi Kurdistan, were discovered. It became possible to excavate the ruins in 2018 and again in 2022 when a drought caused water levels to drop considerably. In the 1st excavation 10 Mitanni-era tablets were found, in Babylonian cuneiform written in Akkadian, bearing Hurrian names, dating to the Middle-Trans-Tigridian IA and IB periods. Middle Trans-Tigridian IA and IB are dated to (c. 1550-1350 BC) and (c. 1350-1270 BC) respectively by Peter Pfälzner (2007). In the 2nd excavation the entire city was mapped and 100 Middle Assyrian tablets were discovered. They were dated to after the city's destruction by earthquake and have not yet been published.

The three phases of Mitanni at Kurd Qaburstan, were obtained as c. 1538–1505 BC for Phase three, with Phase two beginning c. 1512–1491 BC and ending c. 1501–1479 BC, and with Phase One beginning c. 1489–1463 BC and ending c. 1475–1435 BC. The data suggests a two century abandonment between the MBA destruction and the Mitanni re-occupation.

=== Pottery and other characteristics ===
At least since around 1550 BC, at the beginning of Late Bronze Age, Painted Nuzi Ware was identified as a characteristic pottery in Mitanni sites. The origin of this decorated pottery is an unsolved question, but a possible previous development as Aegean Kamares Ware has been suggested by Pecorelia (2000); S. Soldi claims that Tell Brak was one of the first centers specializing in the production of this Painted Nuzi Ware, and analyses on samples support the assumption that it was produced locally in various centers throughout the Mitanni kingdom. It was particularly appreciated in Upper Mesopotamia, but appears only sporadically in western Syrian cities such as Alalakh and Ugarit.

At the height of its power, during the 15th and the first half of the 14th century BC, a large region from North-West Syria to the Eastern Tigris was under Mitanni's control.

== Mitanni rulers ==
Mitanni, which first rose to power before 1550 BC, presents the following known kings:

All dates are Middle chronology

Rulers	Reigned	Comments
Maitta		Eponymous founder, maybe mythical
Kirta	c. 1540 BC	First known king, may be also legendary
Shuttarna I		Son of Kirta based on Alalakh seal
Parattarna I	c. 1500 BC	Son of Kirta, contemporary of Idrimi of Alalakh, Pilliya of Kizzuwatna, Zidanta II of Hatti
Parshatatar	c. 1485 BC	Son of Parattarna I
Shaushtatar	c. 1465 BC	Contemporary of Sinia and Qis-Addu in Terqa; Tudhaliya I of Hatti; Niqmepa of Alalakh, sacks Ashur
Parattarna II	c. 1435 BC	Contemporary of Qis-Addu in Terqa
Shaitarna	c. 1425 BC	Contemporary of Qis-Addu in Terqa
Artatama I	c. 1400 BC	Treaty with pharaoh Thutmose IV, contemporary of pharaoh Amenhotep II
Shuttarna II	c. 1380 BC	Daughter marries pharaoh Amenhotep III in his year 10
Artashumara	c. 1360 BC	Son of Shutarna II, brief reign
Tushratta	c. 1358 BC	Contemporary of Suppiluliuma I of the Hittites, and pharaohs Amenhotep III and Amenhotep IV, Amarna letters
Artatama II	c. 1335 BC	Treaty with Suppiluliuma I of the Hittites, contemporary of Ashur-uballit I in Assyria
Shuttarna III	c. 1330 BC	Contemporary of Suppiluliuma I of the Hittites
Shattiwaza	c. 1330 BC	Vassal of the Hittite Empire, also known as Kurtiwaza or Mattiwaza
Shattuara	c. 1305 BC	Vassal of Assyria under Adad-nirari I
Wasashatta	c. 1285 BC	Son of Shattuara
Shattuara II	c. 1265 BC	Last king of Mitanni before Assyrian conquest

All dates must be taken with caution since they are worked out only by comparison with the chronology of other ancient Near Eastern nations.

=== Parattarna I / Barattarna ===
King Barattarna is known from a cuneiform tablet in Nuzi and an inscription by Idrimi of Alalakh. He reigned c. 1500–1480 BC. Egyptian sources do not mention his name; that he was the king of Naharin whom Thutmose III (1479 – 1425 BC) fought against, can only be deduced from assumptions. This king, also known as Parratarna, is considered, by J. A. Belmonte-Marin quoting H. Klengel, to have reigned c. 1510–1490 BC (middle chronology). Parsha(ta)tar, known from another Nuzi inscription (HSS 13 165), an undated inventory list which mentions his death, is considered a different king than Barattarna by M. P. Maidman, Eva von Dassow, and Ian Mladjov.

Thutmose III again waged war in Mitanni in the 33rd year of his rule. The Egyptian army crossed the Euphrates at Carchemish and reached a town called Iryn (maybe present day Erin, 20 km northwest of Aleppo.) They sailed down the Euphrates to Emar (Maskanah) and then returned home via Mitanni. A hunt for elephants at Lake Nija was important enough to be included in the annals.

Victories over Mitanni are recorded from the Egyptian campaigns in Nuhašše (middle part of Syria). Barattarna or his son Shaushtatar controlled the North Mitanni interior up to Nuhašše, and the coastal territories from Kizzuwatna to Alalakh in the kingdom of Mukish at the mouth of the Orontes. Idrimi of Alalakh, returning from Egyptian exile, could only ascend his throne with Barattarna's consent. While he got to rule Mukish and Ama'u, Aleppo remained with Mitanni.

=== Shaushtatar ===
The central section of Shaushtatar's royal seal. The cuneiform legend reads "DUMU Par-sa-ta-tar" and "LUGAL Ma-i-ta-ni"

Shaushtatar reigned as King of Mitanni c. 1480–1460 BC. He sacked the Assyrian capital of Assur some time in the 15th century during the reign of Nur-ili, and took the silver and golden doors of the royal palace to Washukanni. This is known from a later Hittite document, the Suppililiuma-Shattiwaza treaty. After the sack of Assur, Assyria may have paid tribute to Mitanni up to the time of Eriba-Adad I (1390–1366 BC).

The states of Aleppo in the west, and Nuzi and Arrapḫa in the east, seem to have been incorporated into Mitanni under Shaushtatar as well. A letter (HSS 9 1) sealed with the seal of Shaushtatar was discovered in the house (Room A26) of Prince Šilwa-teššup in Nuzi which lay just north of the main mound. The letter is addressed to Ithia, vassal ruler of Arrapḫa under Mitanni. Because Šauštatar is not mentioned in the letter and dynastic seals were often used after the reign of a ruler, especially in the periphery of empire, it is difficult to date this letter. Stein, based on various factors, puts the date at c. 1400 BC. His seal shows heroes and winged geniuses fighting lions and other animals, as well as a winged sun. This style, with a multitude of figures distributed over the whole of the available space, is taken as typically Hurrian. A second seal, belonging to Shuttarna I and found in Alalakh, used by Shaushtatar in two letters (AT 13 and 14) shows a more traditional Post-Akkadian – Ur III style.

During the reign of Egyptian Pharaoh Amenhotep II, Mitanni seems to have regained influence in the middle Orontes valley that had been conquered by Thutmose III. Amenhotep II fought in Syria in 1425 BC, presumably against Mitanni as well, but did not reach the Euphrates.

=== Artatama I and Shuttarna II ===
Later on, Egypt and Mitanni became allies, and King Shuttarna II himself was received at the Egyptian court. Amicable letters, sumptuous gifts, and letters asking for sumptuous gifts were exchanged. Three Amarna letters (EA 182 EA 183 and EA 185) were sent by Shutarna with two being sent from "Mušiḫuna". Mitanni was especially interested in Egyptian gold. This culminated in a number of royal marriages: the daughter of King Artatama I was married to Thutmose IV. Kilu-Hepa, or Gilukhipa, the daughter of Shuttarna II, was married to Pharaoh Amenhotep III, who ruled in the early 14th century BC. In a later royal marriage Tadu-Hepa, or Tadukhipa, the daughter of Tushratta, was sent to Egypt.

When Amenhotep III fell ill, the king of Mitanni sent him a statue of the goddess Shaushka (Ishtar) of Nineveh that was reputed to cure diseases. A more or less permanent border between Egypt and Mitanni seems to have existed near Qatna on the Orontes River; Ugarit was part of Egyptian territory.

The reason Mitanni sought peace with Egypt may have been trouble with the Hittites. A Hittite king called Tudḫaliya I conducted campaigns against Kizzuwatna, Arzawa, Ishuwa, Aleppo, and maybe against Mitanni itself. Kizzuwatna may have fallen to the Hittites at that time.

=== Artashumara and Tushratta ===
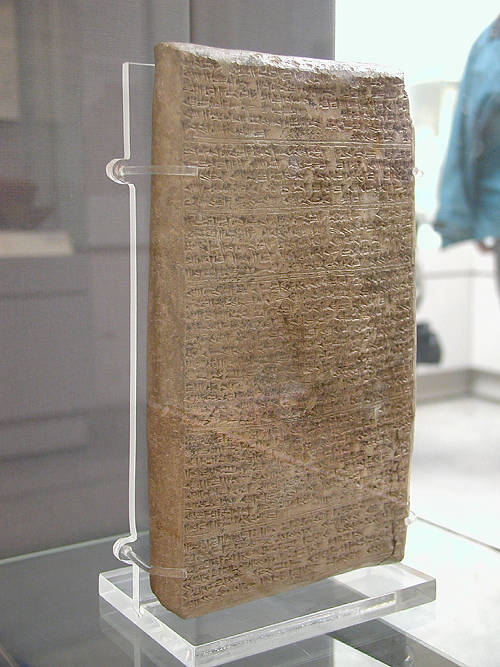
Cuneiform tablet containing a letter from Tushratta of Mitanni to Amenhotep III (of 13 letters of King Tushratta). British Museum

Artašumara, reigned c. 1360-1358 BC, is known only from a single mention in a tablet found in Tell Brak: "Artassumara the king, son of Shuttarna the king," and a mention in Amarna letter 17. According to the later, after the death of Shuttarna II he briefly took power but was then murdered (by someone named Tuhi) and succeeded by his brother Tushratta, who reigned c. 1358-1335 BC.

Knowledge of Tushratta comes from two sources, the Amarna letters and the texts of the Suppiluliuma-Shattiwaza treaties between Hittite ruler Suppiluliuma I and a son of Tushratta named Shattiwaza. These pair of treaties found at the ancient Hittite capital of Hattusa codify the Mitanni Shattiwaza, probable son of Tushratta, entering the status of vassal to Suppiluliuma I. One (CTH 51, also known as KBo I 1) includes a historical prologue from the Hittite point of view which is complete, this tablet also confirms that the existing Hittite treaty with Artatama II is still in effect so perhaps Suppiluliuma was hedging his bets. The other (CTH 52) includes a historical prologue from the Mitanni point of view which is partially lost though another fragment to this tablet was found in recent years. These prologues provide information about the events of the time of Tushratta but must be considered under the self interest of the two treaty parties. While the preambles of the treaties are a later retrospective and are filtered through the interests of the treaty parties, the tablets found in Egypt provide direct information. Eight Amarna letters were sent to pharaoh Amenhotep III (including EA 19 and EA 23) and four to pharaoh Akhenaten (including EA 27). A single Amarna letter was sent by Tushratta to Queen Tiye, wife of Amenhotep III, mother of Akhenaten and grandmother of Tutankhamun (EA 26). A note in hieratic on the tablet stated that EA 23 arrived in the 36th year of Amenhotep III reign or roughly 1350 BC in the standard Egyptian Chronology.

Some of the Amarna letters covered minor matters between Tushratta and the pharaohs. Amenhotep III asked for Tushratta's daughter Tadukhipa in marriage and after some back and forth over bride-price she traveled to Egypt and became a wife of the pharaoh. And when that pharaoh was ill near the end of his reign Tushratta sent (EA 23) the Hurrian goddess Šauška of Nineveh (actually her cult statue) to him as had been done in the time of Shuttarna II. The main focus of the Amarna letters, though, was a consequence of the realignment of power in Syria with the decline of Egyptian influence and rise of Hittite power, with a number of lesser powers caught in the middle. In the first letter from Tusratta he claimed to have destroyed the Hittite forces that had invaded his territory and included a selection of the booty, including a chariot and several slaves. In later letters we see the Hittite ruler working to improve previously poor relations with the pharaoh so as to counterbalance Mitanni. According to other Amarna letters (EA 85, EA86, EA95) from Rib-Hadda, king of Byblos, Tushratta personally joined a large Mitanni raid into Amurru. In another Amarna letter (EA 75) Rib-Hadda tells Ahkenaten that all the lands of the Mitanni have been conquered by the Hittites but its date is uncertain.

The Suppiluliuma-Shattiwaza treaty says:

When with the Sun, Shubbiluliuma, the great valiant, the king of Hatti, the beloved of Teshub, Artatama king of Harri, made a treaty and thereafter, Tushratta, king of Mitanni, exalted him, the king of Hatti, the valiant, exalted myself against Tushratta, the king of lands on this side of the river I plundered, and Mount Niblani I restored to my domain...When his son waxed strong with his servants, he slew his father Tushratta, the king. And when Tushratta, the king, died, Teshub gave a decision in favor of Artatama, and his son Artatama he spared...But the Harri people had become discontented and Shutatarra with the Marianni tried to kill Mattiuaza, the prince. He escaped and before the Sun, Shubbiluliuma...he came. The great king spoke thus: 'Teshub has rendered a decision in his favor.' Whereupon I took Mattiuaza, son of Tushratta, the king, into my hand, and placed him on the throne of his father."

Tusratta faced a difficult situation, an ascendant Hittite New Kingdom in the west and in the east an Assyrian power beginning to free itself of Mitanni control at the start of the Middle Assyrian Period. A rule book-ended by succession crises. With no Mitanni or Assyrian records we are left with the historical claims of the Hittite king, for better or worse. In summary they are:

- Political – With the death of Shutarna II a crisis involving Tushratta and Artashumara resulted in Tushratta taking the throne. To counter this the Hittites entered a treaty with another brother Artatama II, which did not pan out. Then, after a reasonably long reign (based on the timing of Amarna letters), Tushratta is killed by his son (unnamed but generally thought to be Shuttarna III) who then allies with the Assyrians to take power in Mitanni with Assyria getting some Mitanni territory in exchange. Another son of Tushratta, Shattiwaza, then becomes a vassal of the Hittite king in exchange for help retaking part of the Mitanni territory (with the rest going to the Suppiluliuma' son Piyassili made king of Carchemish). And this comes to pass. Note that the original treaty with Artatama II is specifically kept in force, suggesting he outlived Tushratta.
- Military – Tushratta having insulted the Hittite king, perhaps by refusing to be deposed, Suppiluliuma launched two campaigns against Mitanni interests, a "One Year War" and a "Six Year War". The first war is believed to have occurred roughly in the 15th regnal year of Ahkenaten. It is unclear how much time passes between them. Though unsuccessful at defeating Tushratta, the military efforts do manage to seize control of several Mitanni vassals/allies, including Kizzuwatna, Amurru, Aleppo, and Nuhašše.

=== Shattiwaza ===
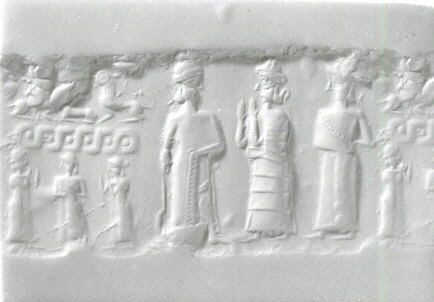
Cylinder seal, c. 1500–1350 BC, Mitanni

Shattiwaza reigned c. 1330–1305 BC, (alternately Šattiwaza, Kurtiwaza, or Mattiwaza). What little is known about his period, like the later parts of the reign of his father, Tushratta, all comes from the partially recovered pair of Hittite texts in which Shattiwaza becomes a vassal of Hittite king Suppiluliuma I. The first text (CTH 51) lays out the condition of vassalage and in the second (CTH 52) Shattiwaza accepts these conditions. The text can be difficult to interpret because of gaps and the obtuse prose. The Suppiluliuma-Shattiwaza treaty reads:

[When ?] (I), Mattiuaza, son of Tushratta, king of Mitanni, handed over to Shuttarna, [rulership] of Mitanni, Artatama, the king, his father, did what was not right. His palace(?) . . . together with his possessions, he wasted; to give them to Assyria and Alshe, he wasted them. Tushratta, the king, my father, built a palace, filled (it) with treasures, but Shuttarna destroyed it, he overthrew it."

The best that can be parsed out of the Hittite text is that some (unnamed) son killed the prior king Tushratta resulting in a succession crisis between Atratama II, brother of Tushratta, Shuttarna III, son of Tusratta, and Shattiwaza. son of Tushratta. The Hittites then made a treaty with Atratama II (still in effect as of the Suppiluliuma-Shattiwaza treaty). Some combination of Atratama II and Shuttarna III made an alliance with the Assyrians to hold power in Mitanni. returning cultic items taken when Mitanni king Shaushtatar sacked Asshur c. 1450. This resulted in Shattiwaza going to Hittite king Suppiluliuma and declaring vassalage in exchange for Hittite military assistance. This ploy succeeded as the Hittite forces carried the day but the cost, besides becoming a vassal, was the ceding of some Mitanni territory to the Hittites, subsequently ruled by the king's son Piyassili as King of Carchemesh. As part of the agreement Shattiwaza would marry a daughter of Suppiluliuma as Queen and would be allowed ten wives but none of the other wives could be primary and the children from his marriage with the Queen would succeed. The Hittite text does include some tidbits about the war of succession which are hard to interpret. At one point the Hurrian nobles were taken to Taite and "crucified" though that practice was unknown in the ancient Near East until classical times. And at one point Shattiwaza flees to the Kassites with 200 chariots but the Kassites impounded the chariots and tried to kill him, which he mirsculously escapes and finds his way to Suppiluliuma. After presumably ascending the throne of what was left of Mitanni, Shattiwaza is lost to history.

=== Shattuara I ===
Shattuara reigned c. 1305–1285 BC. The royal inscriptions of the Assyrian king Adad-nirari I (c. 1307–1275 BC) relate how the vassal king Shattuara of Mitanni rebelled and committed hostile acts against Assyria. How this Shattuara was related to the dynasty of Partatama is unclear. Some scholars think that he was the second son of Artatama II, and the brother of Shattiwazza's one-time rival Shuttarna. Adad-nirari claims to have captured King Shattuara and brought him to Ashur, where he took an oath as a vassal. Afterwards, he was allowed to return to Mitanni, where he paid Adad-nirari regular tribute. This must have happened during the reign of the Hittite King Mursili II, but there is no exact date.

=== Wasashatta ===
According to an inscription (BM 115687) by Assyrian king Adad-nirari I, Shattuara's son Wasashatta (also read Uasašatta), who reigned c. 1285-1265 BC, attempted to rebel. He sought Hittite help which did not come. The Hittites took Wasashatta's money but did not help. The Assyrians expanded further, and conquered the royal city of Taidu, and took Washukanni, Amasakku, Kahat, Shuru, Nabula, Hurra and Shuduhu as well. They conquered Irridu, destroyed it utterly and sowed salt over it. The wife, sons and daughters of Wasashatta were taken to Ashur, together with much booty and other prisoners. As Wasashatta himself is not mentioned, he may have escaped capture. There is a letter (KBo. 1, 14) from a Hittite king (to probably the Egyptian king) referring to a "King of Hanigalbat" which was possibly Wasašatta.

=== Shattuara II ===
According to the royal annals (A.0.77.1) of Assyrian king Shalmaneser I (1270s–1240s) King Shattuara II of Hanigalbat, rebelled against Assyrian control with the help of the Hittites and the nomadic Ahlamu around 1250 BC. Shalmaneser I claimed to have defeated the Hittites and Mitanni slaying 14,400 men; the rest were blinded and carried away. His inscriptions mention the conquest of nine fortified temples; 180 Hurrian cities were "turned into rubble mounds," and Shalmaneser "slaughtered like sheep the armies of the Hittites and the Ahlamu his allies." The cities from Taidu to Irridu were captured, as well as all of mount Kashiar to Eluhat and the fortresses of Sudu and Harranu to Carchemish on the Euphrates. Another inscription mentions the restoration of a temple to god Adad in Kahat, a city of Mitanni that must have been occupied as well.

== See also ==
- Chronology of the ancient Near East
- List of Mesopotamian dynasties
- Cities of the ancient Near East
- History of the Hittites
- Seven-dots glyph

== Sources ==
- Bryce, Trevor, Letters of the Great Kings of the Ancient Near East, Routledge, 2003, ISBN 0-415-25857-X
- Bryce, Trevor (2005). The Kingdom of the Hittites. Oxford University Press. ISBN 978-0-19-927908-1.
- Sigfried J. de Laet, ed. (1996). History of Humanity: From the Third Millennium to the Seventh Century B.C. UNESCO Publishing. ISBN 978-92-3-102811-3.
- Fournet, Arnaud (2010). "About the Mitanni-Aryan Gods". Journal of Indo-European Studies. 38 (1): 26–40.
- Gaal, E. "The economic role of Hanilgalbat at the beginning of the Neo-Assyrian expansion." In: Hans-Jörg Nissen/Johannes Renger (eds.), Mesopotamien und seine Nachbarn. Politische und kulturelle Wechselbeziehungen im Alten Orient vom 4. bis 1. Jahrtausend v. Chr. Berliner Beiträge zum Vorderen Orient 1 (Berlin, Reimer 1982), 349–354.
- Harrak, Amir "Assyria and Hanilgalbat. A historical reconstruction of the bilateral relations from the middle of the 14th to the end of the 12th centuries BC." Texte und Studien zur Orientalistik, 400 (Hildesheim, Olms 1987).
- Kelly-Buccellati, Marilyn. "The Urkesh Mittani Horizon: Ceramic Evidence." talugaeš witteš (2020): 237–256.
- Kühne, Cord, "Imperial Mittani. An Attempt at Historical Reconstruction", In David I Owen and Gernot Wilhelm (eds.) Studies in the Civilization and Culture of Nuzi and the Hurrians 10, pp. 203–221, 1999 ISBN 9781883053505
- Kühne, Cord "Politische Szenerie und internationale Beziehungen Vorderasiens um die Mitte des 2. Jahrtausends vor Chr. (zugleich ein Konzept der Kurzchronologie). Mit einer Zeittafel." In: Hans-Jörg Nissen/Johannes Renger (eds.), Mesopotamien und seine Nachbarn. Politische und kulturelle Wechselbeziehungen im Alten Orient vom 4. bis 1. Jahrtausend v. Chr. Berliner Beiträge zum Vorderen Orient 1 (Berlin, Reimer 1982), 203–264.
- Maidman, Maynard P. "Mittanni Royalty and Empire: How Far Back." Canadian Society for Mesopotamian Studies Journal 11 (2018): 15–28
- Novák, Mirko: "Mittani Empire and the Question of Absolute Chronology: Some Archaeological Considerations." In: Manfred Bietak/Ernst Czerny (eds.): "The Synchronisation of Civilisations in the Eastern Mediterranean in the Second Millennium BC III"; Österreichische Akademie der Wissenschaften Denkschrift Band XXXVII; Wien, 2007; ISBN 978-3-7001-3527-2; pp. 389–401.
- Starr, R. F. S. Nuzi (London 1938).
- Thieme, Paul (1960). "The 'Aryan' Gods of the Mitanni Treaties". Journal of the American Oriental Society. 80 (4): 301–317. doi:10.2307/595878. ISSN 0003-0279. JSTOR 595878.
- von Dassow, E.; David I Owen; Gernot Wilhelm, State and Society in the Late Bronze Age: Alalah under the Mittani Empire, Studies on the Civilization and Culture of Nuzi and the Hurrians 17, ed. David I. Owen and Gernot Wilhelm (Bethesda 2008) ISBN 9781934309148
- von Dassow, Eva (2014). "Levantine Polities under Mittanian Hegemony". In Eva Cancik-Kirschbaum, Nicole Brisch and Jesper Eidem (ed.). Constituent, Confederate, and Conquered Space: The Emergence of the Mittani State. pp. 11–32.
- von Dassow, Eva (2022). "Mittani and Its Empire". In Radner, Karen; Moeller, Nadine; Potts, Daniel T. (eds.). The Oxford History of the Ancient Near East, Volume 3: From the Hyksos to the Late Second Millennium BC. New York: Oxford University Press. pp. 455–528.
- von Dassow, Eva. "Alalaḫ between Mittani and Ḫatti." Asia Anteriore Antica. Journal of Ancient Near Eastern Cultures 2 (2020): 196–226
- Weidner, "Assyrien und Hanilgalbat." Ugaritica 6 (1969)
- Wilhelm, Gernot: The Hurrians, Aris & Philips Warminster 1989. ISBN 9780856684425
