= Shattiwaza =

King of Mitanni
- Reign: 1345-1320 BC (high); 1330-1305 BC (low)
- Predecessor: Shuttarna III
- Successor: Shattuara
- Father: Tushratta

Shattiwaza or Šattiwaza, alternatively referred to as Kurtiwaza or Mattiwaza, was a king of the Hurrian kingdom of Mitanni, who reigned c. 1330-1305 BC.

== Biography ==
Shattiwaza was the son of king Tushratta. Like other Mitanni kings, Shattiwaza took a throne name derived from Indo-Aryan. The throne name Shattiwaza means ‘having reached the prize.’ His Hurrian name was Kili-Tešup.

In the political turmoil following the death of his predecessor, the usurper Shuttarna III tried to murder Shattiwaza. Shattiwaza escaped and sought refuge by the Hittite king Suppiluliuma I. He married the daughter of Suppiluliuma and returned to Mitanni with a Hittite army. He was assisted by Piyassili (Sarri-Kusuh), a son of King Šuppiluliuma I.

Shuttarna III, who had usurped the throne in his absence was defeated, and Shattiwaza installed as king of Mitanni. The events are recorded in two treaties of Suppiluliuma and Shattiwaza (sometime between 1345 and 1323 BC).

But Piyassili and the Hittites may have received the whole former territory of Hanigalbat/Mitanni west of the Euphrates as the result of these events.

Shattuara is believed to be the next Mitanni king, although the circumstances of how he came to power are uncertain. Assyrian king Adad-nirari I claimed to be his overlord.

== Sources ==
- Beckman, Gary (1996). Harry A. Hoffner (ed.). Hittite Diplomatic Texts. Scholars Press. ISBN 978-0788505515.

Preceded by Shuttarna III	Mitanni king late 14th century BC	Succeeded by Shattuara, as an Assyrian vassal
