= List of state leaders in the 14th century BC =

State leaders in the 15th century BC – State leaders in the 13th century BC – State leaders by year

This is a list of state leaders in the 14th century BC (1400–1301 BC).

== Africa: Northeast ==
Egypt: New Kingdom

- Eighteenth Dynasty of the New Kingdom (complete list) –

- Amenhotep II, King (1425–1398 BC)
- Thutmose IV, King (1398–1388 BC)
- Amenhotep III, King (1388–1350 BC)
- Akhenaten, King (1351–1334 BC)
- Smenkhkare, King (1335–1334 BC)
- Neferneferuaten, Queen (1334–1332 BC)
- Tutankhamun, King (1332–1323 BC)
- Ay, King (1323–1319 BC)
- Horemheb, King (1319–1292 BC)

== Asia ==
=== Asia: East ===
China

- Shang, China (complete list) –

- Zu Xin, King (c.1405–1389 BC)
- Wo Jia, King (c.1389–1364 BC)
- Zu Ding, King (c.1364–1332 BC)
- Nan Geng, King (c.1332–1303 BC)
- Yang Jia, King (c.1303–1290 BC)

=== Asia: Southeast ===
Vietnam

- Hồng Bàng dynasty (complete list) –

- Đoài line, (c.1431–c.1332 BC)
- Giáp line, (c.1331–c.1252 BC)

=== Asia: West ===
- Hittite: New Kingdom, List –

- Tudhaliya I, King ( 000 )
- Arnuwanda I, King ( 000 )
- Hattusili II, King ( 000 )
- Tudhaliya II, King (c.1360?–1344 BC, short chronology)
- Tudhaliya III, King assassinated upon his father's death, unknown if he actually ruled
- Suppiluliuma I, King (c.1344–1322 BC, short chronology)
- Arnuwanda II, King (c.1322–1321 BC, short chronology)
- Mursili II, King (c.1321–1295 BC, short chronology)

- Mitanni, List –

- Kirta, King (c.1500 BC, short chronology)
- Artatama I, Ruler ( 000 ), contemporary of Pharaohs Thutmose IV and Amenhotep II
- Shuttarna II, Ruler ( 000 )
- Artashumara, Ruler ( 000 )
- Tushratta, Ruler (c.1350 BC, short chronology), contemporary of Hittite Suppiluliuma I and Pharaohs Amenhotep III & IV
- Artatama II, Ruler ( 000 ). ruled same time as Tushratta
- Shuttarna III, Ruler ( 000 ). contemporary of Suppiluliuma I of the Hittites

- Ugarit

- Ammittamru I, King (c.1350 BC)
- Niqmaddu II, King (c.1349–1315 BC) contemporary of Suppiluliuma I of the Hittites
- Arhalba, King (c.1315–1313 BC)
- Niqmepa, King (c.1313–1260 BC) Treaty with Mursili II of the Hittites, Son of Niqmadu II,

- Tyre, Phoenecia –

- Agenor, King (c.1500 BC)
- Phoenix, King ( 000 )

- Assyria

Old Assyrian Period
- Ashur-bel-nisheshu, King (c.1407–1399 BC, short chronology)
- Ashur-rim-nisheshu, King (c.1398–1391 BC, short chronology)
- Ashur-nadin-ahhe II, King (c.1390–1381 BC, short chronology)

- Assyria

Middle Assyrian Period
- Eriba-Adad I, King (c.1380–1353 BC, short chronology)
- Ashur-uballit I, King (c.1353–1318 BC, short chronology)
- Enlil-nirari, King (c.1317–1308 BC, short chronology)
- Arik-den-ili, King (c.1307–1296 BC, short chronology)

- Middle Babylonian period: Kassite dynasty, Third Dynasty of Babylon (complete list) –

- Kadashman-Harbe I, King (c.1400 BC)
- Kurigalzu I, King (d.c.1375 BC)
- Kadashman-Enlil I, King (c.1374–1360 BC), contemporary of Amenophis III
- Burnaburiash II, King (c.1359–1333 BC), contemporary of Akhenaten and Ashur-uballit I
- Kara-hardash, King (c.1333 BC)
- Nazi-Bugash or Shuzigash, King (c.1333 BC)
- Kurigalzu II, King (c.1332–1308 BC), fought Battle of Sugagi with Enlil-nirari of Assyria
- Nazi-Maruttash, King (c.1307–1282 BC), contemporary of Adad-nirari I of Assyria

- Elam:Igehalkid dynasty (complete list) –

- Igi-Halki, King (c.1400 BC)
- Pahir-ishshan, King (c.1390 BC)
- Attar-kittah, King (c.1380 BC)
- Humban-numena I, King (c.1370 BC)
- Untash-Napirisha, King (c.1275 BC)
- Hurbatila, King (late 14th century BC)
- Unpahash-Napirisha, King (14th/13th century BC)
