= Royal intermarriage =

Practice of ruling dynasties marrying into other reigning families

Royal intermarriages

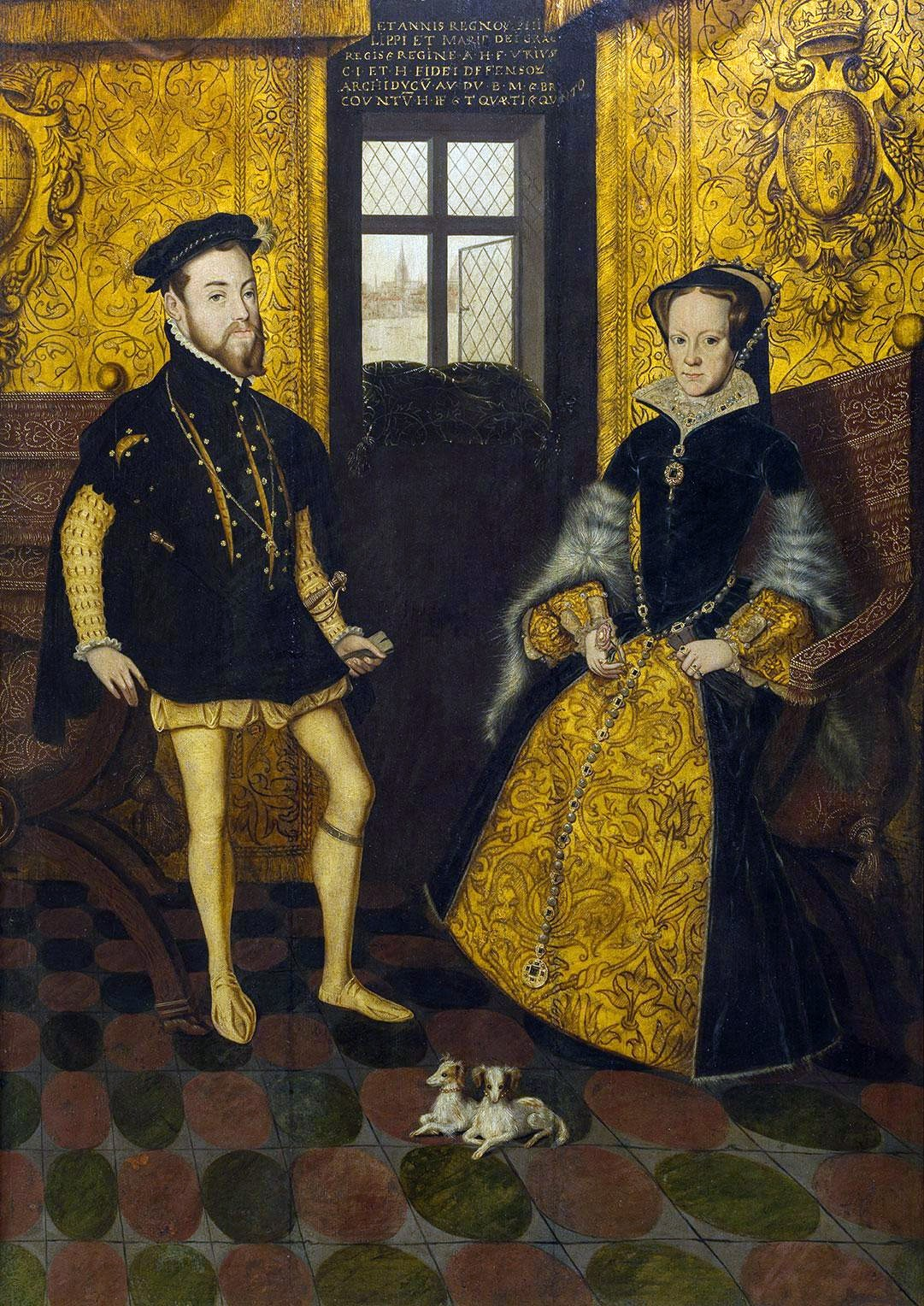
The Habsburg Philip II of Spain and his wife, the Tudor Mary I of England.

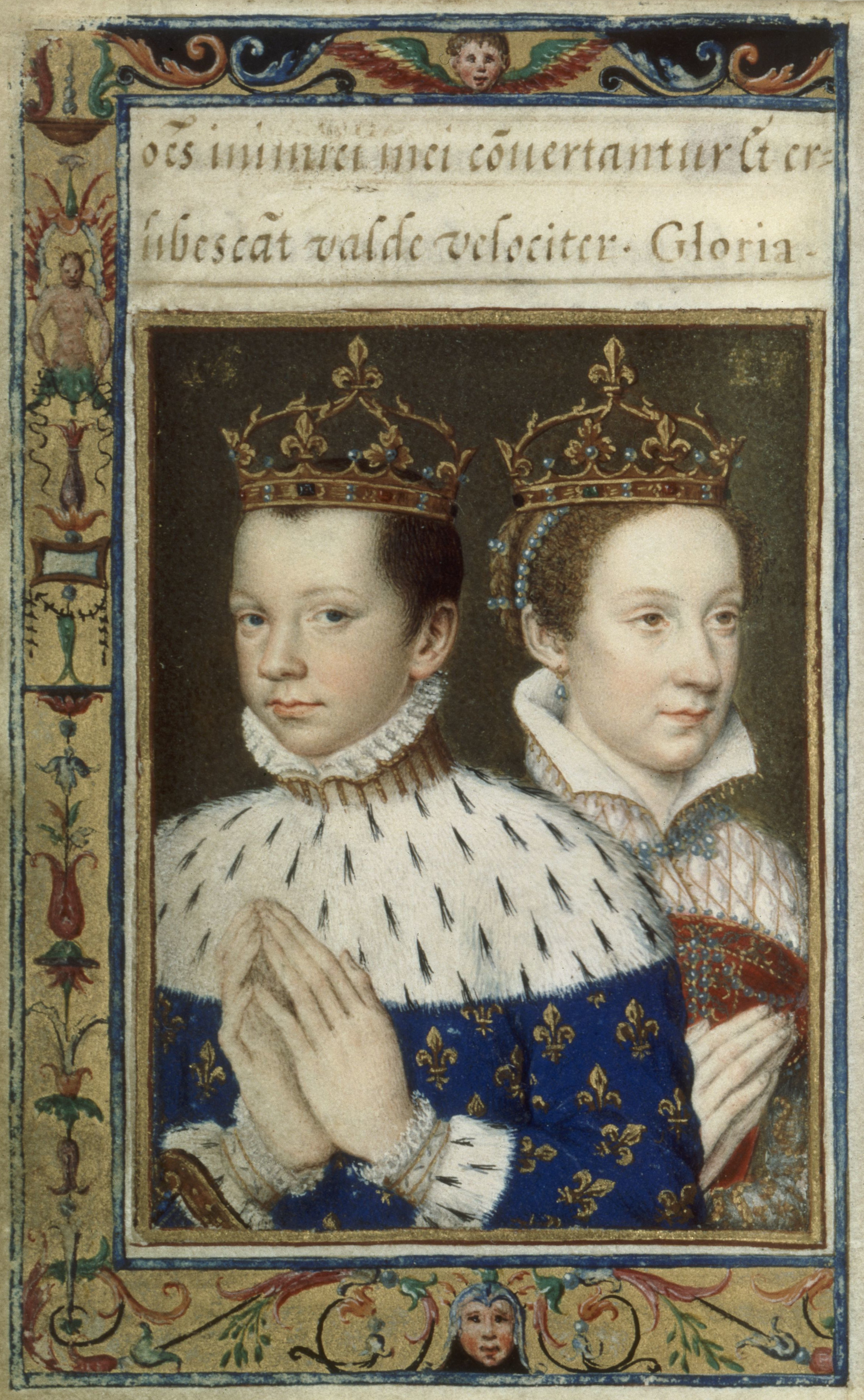
Mary, Queen of Scots and her first husband, Francis II of France, shortly after his coronation.

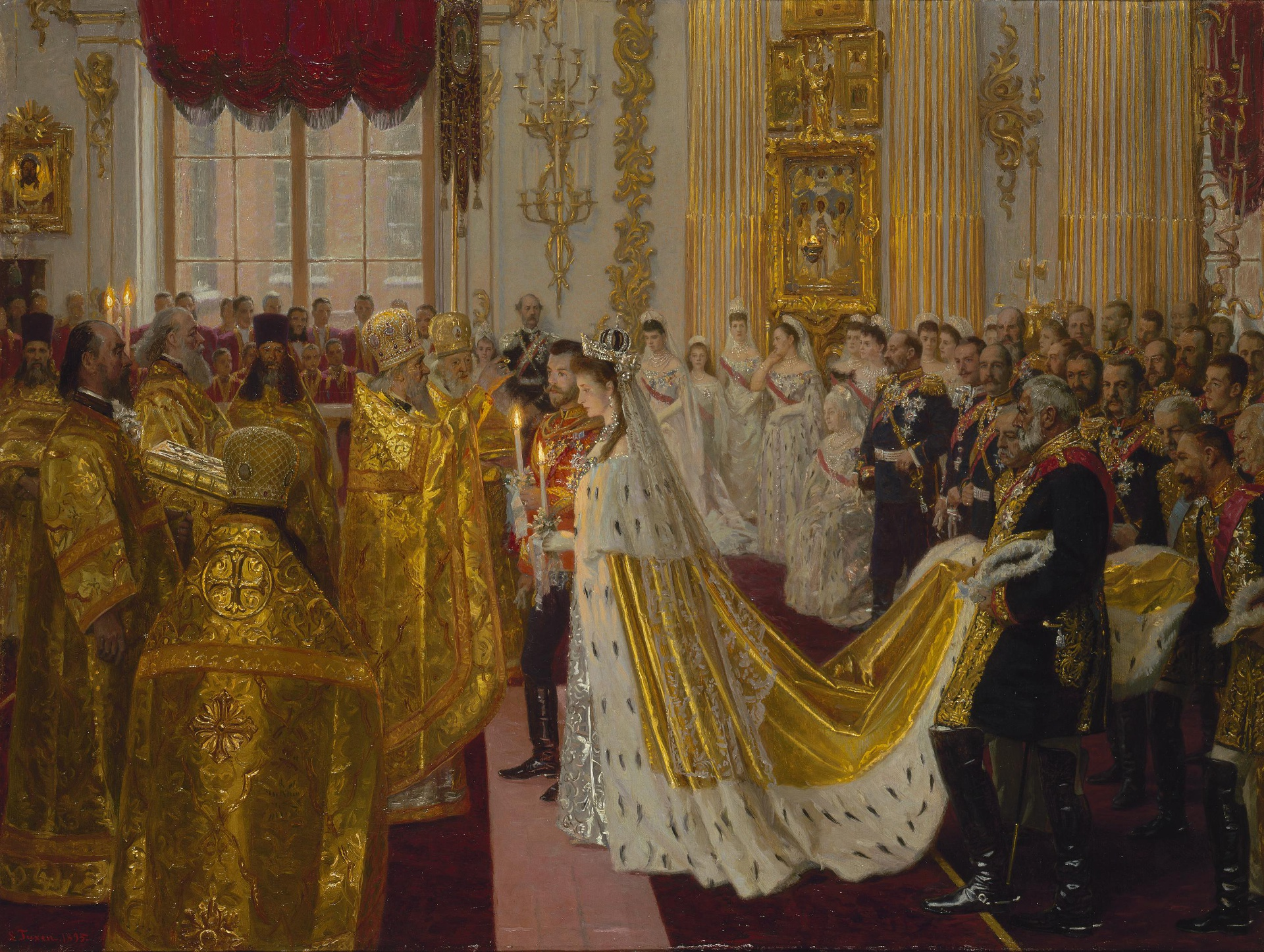
The wedding of Nicholas II of Russia and Alix of Hesse.

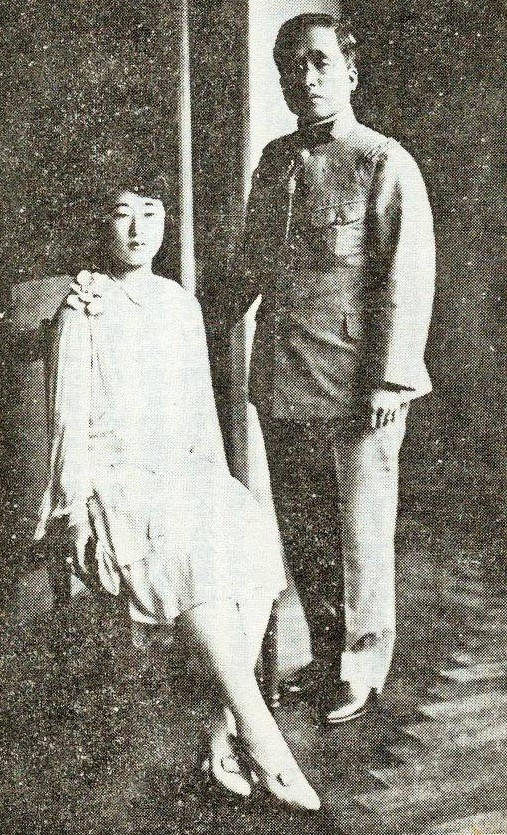
The wedding photo of Yi Un and Princess Masako of Nashimoto.

Royal intermarriage is the practice of members of ruling dynasties marrying into other reigning families. It was more commonly done in the past as part of strategic diplomacy for national interest. Although sometimes enforced by legal requirement on persons of royal birth, more often it has been a matter of political policy or tradition in monarchies.

In Europe, the practice was most prevalent from the medieval era until the outbreak of World War I, but evidence of intermarriage between royal dynasties in other parts of the world can be found as far back as the Bronze Age. Monarchs were often in pursuit of national and international aggrandisement on behalf of themselves and their dynasties, thus bonds of kinship tended to promote or restrain aggression. Marriage between dynasties could serve to initiate, reinforce or guarantee peace between nations. Alternatively, kinship by marriage could secure an alliance between two dynasties which sought to reduce the sense of threat from or to initiate aggression against the realm of a third dynasty. It could also enhance the prospect of territorial acquisition for a dynasty by procuring legal claim to a foreign throne, or portions of its realm (e.g., colonies), through inheritance from an heiress whenever a monarch failed to leave an undisputed male heir.

In parts of Europe, royalty continued to regularly marry into the families of their greatest vassals as late as the 16th century. More recently, they have tended to marry internationally. In other parts of the world royal intermarriage was less prevalent and the number of instances varied over time, depending on the culture and foreign policy of the era.

== Africa ==
At times, marriage between members of the same dynasty has been common in Central Africa.

Marriages between the Swazi, Zulu and Thembu royal houses of southern Africa are common. For example, the daughter of South African president and Thembu royal Nelson Mandela, Zenani Mandela, married Prince Thumbumuzi Dlamini, a brother of Mswati III, King of Eswatini. Elsewhere in the region, Princess Semane Khama of the Bamangwato tribe of Botswana married Kgosi Lebone Edward Molotlegi of the Bafokeng tribe of South Africa.

Other examples of historical, mythical and contemporary royal intermarriages throughout Africa include:

- Princess Mantfombi Dlamini, sister of Mswati III of Eswatini, and Goodwill Zwelithini, King of the Zulus, as his chief queen consort
- The Toucouleur emperor Umar Tall and Princess Maryem, the daughter of Sultan Muhammed Bello of Sokoto

Pharaoh Amenhotep III alone is known to have married several foreign women: Gilukhepa, daughter of Shuttarna II of Mitanni, in the tenth year of his reign; Tadukhepa, daughter of his ally Tushratta of Mitanni, around Year 36 of his reign; a daughter of Kurigalzu I of Babylon; a daughter of Kadashman-Enlil I of Babylon; a daughter of Tarhundaradu of Arzawa; and a daughter of the ruler of Ammia (in modern Syria).

== Asia ==
=== Babylonia and Assyria ===
There are a few recorded cases of intermarriage between Assyrian and Babylonian royals. According to legend, the Babylonian Semiramis was married to the Assyrian general Onnes and then to the Assyrian king Ninus, the legendary founder of Nineveh according to the Ancient Greeks. She has been equated with the historical Shammuramat, wife of Shamshi-Adad V. In turn, Shammuramat has been claimed to be of Babylonian descent. In the early 9th century BC, the Babylonian king Nabu-shuma-ukin I (Dynasty of E) exchanged daughters in marriage with the contemporary Assyrian monarch. The Assyrian princess Muballitat-Sherua, daughter of Ashur-uballit I, was given in marriage to the contemporary Babylonian monarch. She was the mother of the future Babylonian king Kara-hardash. Additionally, Kurigalzu II was either the son or grandson of Muballitat. Other consorts of Assyrian monarchs, such as Naqiʾa, Ešarra-ḫammat, Banitu (who was perhaps brought to Assyria as a hostage after Tiglath-Pileser's conquest of Babylon) might also have been of Babylonian origin.

=== Babylon and Elam ===
Babylonians and Elamites engaged many times in royal intermarriage, especially in the Kassite period. It is probable that Elamites and Kassites had close ties long before the first attested royal intermarriages between them. Babylonian Kassites and Elamites intensively intermarried for a period of about 120 years, from c. 1290 to 1170 BC. The royal intermarriages in this period were: Pahir-ishshan to eldest daughter (princess) of Kurigalzu II (1290); Untash-Napirisha to daughter of prince Burnaburiash (1250); Kidin-Hutran to daughter of prince [...]-duniash (1230); Shutruk-Nakhunte to the eldest daughter of Melishihu. Also Napirisha-Untash (c. 1210 BC) and Hutelutush-Inshushinak (c. 1190) are thought to have married Babylonian Kassite princesses. A man of Elamite origin, Mar-biti-apla-usur, the founder of the so-called Elamite dynasty, reigned in Babylon from around 980 to 975 BC, though the identity and origin of his consort are unknown. He might not have been himself from Elam but a Babylonian partially of Elamite origin.

=== Thailand ===
The Chakri dynasty of Thailand has included marriages between royal relatives, but marriages between dynasties and foreigners, including foreign royals, are rare. This is in part due to Section 11 of 1924 Palace Law of Succession which excludes members of the royal family from the line of succession if they marry a non-Thai national.

The late king Bhumibol Adulyadej was a first cousin once removed of his wife, Sirikit, the two being, respectively, a grandson and a great-granddaughter of Chulalongkorn. Chulalongkorn married a number of his half-sisters, including Savang Vadhana and Sunandha Kumariratana; all shared the same father, Mongkut.

=== Vietnam ===
The Lý dynasty which ruled Dai Viet (Vietnam) married its princesses off to regional rivals to establish alliances with them. One of these marriages was between a Lý empress regnant (Lý Chiêu Hoàng) and a member of fishermen-turned-warlords Trần clan (Trần Thái Tông) from Nam Định, which enabled the Trần to then topple the Lý and established their own Trần dynasty.

A Lý princess also married into the Hồ clan faction, which later usurped power and established the Hồ dynasty after having a Tran princess marry their leader, Hồ Quý Ly.

=== Cambodia ===
The Cambodian King Chey Chettha II married the Vietnamese Nguyễn lord Princess Nguyễn Thị Ngọc Vạn, a daughter of Lord Nguyễn Phúc Nguyên, in 1618. In return, the king granted the Vietnamese the right to establish settlements in Mô Xoài (now Bà Rịa), in the region of Prey Nokor—which they colloquially referred to as Sài Gòn, and which later became Ho Chi Minh City.

=== India ===
In the Chola dynasty in southern India, Madhurantaki the daughter of Emperor Rajendra II married Kulottunga I the son of Eastern Chalukya ruler Rajaraja Narendra. This was to improve the relationship between the two royal houses and to straighten Chola influence in Vengai.

=== China ===
The Xiongnu practiced marriage alliances with Han dynasty officers and officials who defected to their side. The elder sister of the chanyu (the Xiongnu ruler) was married to the Xiongnu general Zhao Xin, the Marquis of Xi who was serving the Han dynasty. The daughter of the chanyu was married to the Han Chinese general Li Ling after he surrendered and defected. The Yenisei Kyrgyz khagans claimed descent from Li Ling. Another Han general who defected to the Xiongnu was Li Guangli who also married a daughter of the chanyu.

The Xianbei Tuoba imperial family of Northern Wei started to arrange for Han elites to marry daughters of the imperial family in the 480s. Some exiled Han royalty fled from southern China and defected to the Xianbei. Several daughters of Emperor Xiaowen of Northern Wei were married to Han elites — the Liu Song royal Liu Hui (劉輝) married Princess Lanling (蘭陵公主); Princess Huayang (華陽公主) to Sima Fei (司馬朏), a descendant of the Jin dynasty; Princess Jinan (濟南公主) to Lu Daoqian (盧道虔); Princess Nanyang (南陽長公主) to Xiao Baoyin (蕭寶夤) from Southern Qi. Emperor Xiaozhuang of Northern Wei's sister Princess Shouyang was wedded to the Liang dynasty ruler Emperor Wu of Liang's son Xiao Zong (蕭綜).

When the Eastern Jin dynasty ended, Northern Wei received the Jin prince Sima Chuzhi (司馬楚之) as a refugee. A Northern Wei princess married Sima Chuzhi, giving birth to Sima Jinlong. Northern Liang prince Juqu Mujian's daughter married Sima Jinlong.

The Rouran Khaganate arranged for one of their princesses, Khagan Yujiulü Anagui's daughter, Princess Ruru (蠕蠕公主), to be married to Gao Huan, the Han ruler of the Eastern Wei.

The Kingdom of Gaochang was made out of Han colonists and ruled by the Han Qu family that originated from Gansu. Jincheng Commandery (金城; Lanzhou), district of Yuzhong (榆中) was the home of the Qu Jia. The Qu family was linked by marriage alliances to the Turks, with a Turk being the grandmother of King Qu Boya.

Tang dynasty (618–907) emperors and the rulers of the Uyghur Khaganate exchanged princesses in marriage to consolidate the special trade and military relationship that developed after the khaganate supported the Chinese during the An Lushan Rebellion. The Uyghur Khaganate first exchanged princesses in marriage with Tang China in 756 to seal the alliance against An Lushan. The Uyghur Khagan Bayanchur Khan had his daughter Princess Pijia (毗伽公主) married to Li Chengcai (李承采), Prince of Dunhuang (敦煌王) and son of Li Shouli, Prince of Bin, while Princess Ningguo of the Tang dynasty married Uyghur Khagan Bayanchur. At least three Tang imperial princesses are known to have married khagans between 758 and 821. These unions temporarily stopped in 788, partly because stability within China meant that they were politically unnecessary. However, threats from Tibet in the west, and a renewed need for Uyghur support, precipitated the marriage of Princess Taihe to Bilge Khagan.

The ethnically Han Cao family ruling Guiyi Circuit established marriage alliances with the Uighurs of the Ganzhou Kingdom, with both the Cao rulers marrying Uighur princesses and with Cao princesses marrying Uighur rulers. The Ganzhou Uighur khagan's daughter was married to Cao Yijin in 916.

The Cao family also established marriage alliances with the Saka Kingdom of Khotan, with both the Cao rulers marrying Khotanese princesses and with Cao princesses marrying Khotanese rulers. A Khotanese princess who was the daughter of the king of Khotan married Cao Yanlu.

The Khitan Liao dynasty arranged for women from the Khitan Xiao consort clan to marry members of the Han (韓) clan, which originated in Jizhou (冀州) before being abducted by the Khitan and becoming part of the Han elite of the Liao.

The Han Geng family intermarried with the Khitan, and the Han (韓) clan provided two of their women as wives to Geng Yanyi, and the second one was the mother of Geng Zhixin. Empress Rende's sister, a member of the Xiao clan, was the mother of Han general Geng Yanyi.

Han Durang (Yelu Longyun) was the father of Dowager Princess Consort of the Chen State, the wife of general Geng Yanyi who buried with him in his tomb in Zhaoyang, Liaoning. His wife was also known as "Madame Han". The Geng's tomb is located in Liaoning at Guyingzi in Chaoying.

Emperors of the Song dynasty (960–1279) tended to marry from within their own borders. Tang emperors mainly took their wives from high-ranking families, but the Song dynasty did not consider rank important when it came to selecting their consorts. It has been estimated that only a quarter of Song consorts were from such families, with the rest being from lower status backgrounds. For example, Lady Liu, wife of Emperor Zhenzong, had been a street performer, and Consort Miao of Emperor Renzong was the daughter of his own wet nurse.

During the Qing dynasty (1644–1912), emperors chose their consorts primarily from one of the eight Banner families, administrative divisions that divide all native Manchu families. Imperial daughters, as with preceding dynasties, were often married to Mongol princes to gain political or military support, especially in the early years of the Qing dynasty; three of the nine daughters of Nurhaci and twelve of Hong Taiji's daughters were married to Mongol princes.

The Manchu imperial Aisin Gioro clan practiced marriage alliances with Ming generals and Mongol princes. Aisin Gioro women were married to Han generals who defected to the Manchu side during the Manchu conquest of China. The Manchu leader Nurhaci married one of his granddaughters to the Ming general Li Yongfang (李永芳) after he surrendered Fushun in Liaoning to the Manchu in 1618 and a mass marriage of Han officers and officials to Manchu women numbering 1,000 couples was arranged by Prince Yoto (岳托) (Prince Keqin) and Hong Taiji in 1632 to promote harmony between the two ethnic groups. Aisin Gioro women were married to the sons of the Han generals Sun Sike (Sun Ssu-k'o) (孫思克) Geng Jimao (Keng Chi-mao), Shang Kexi (Shang K'o-hsi), and Wu Sangui (Wu San-kuei).

Nurhaci's son Abatai's daughter was married to Li Yongfang. The offspring of Li received the "Third Class Viscount" (三等子爵; sān děng zǐjué) title. Li Yongfang was the great-great-great-grandfather of Li Shiyao (李侍堯).

The "efu" (額駙) rank was given to husbands of Qing princesses. Geng Zhongming, a Han bannerman, was awarded the title of Prince Jingnan, and his son Geng Jinmao managed to have both his sons Geng Jingzhong and Geng Zhaozhong (耿昭忠) become court attendants under the Shunzhi Emperor and married to Aisin Gioro women, with Abatai's granddaughter marrying Geng Zhaozhong (耿昭忠) and Haoge's (a son of Hong Taiji) daughter marrying Geng Jingzhong. A daughter of Yolo (岳樂) (Prince An) was wedded to Geng Juzhong (耿聚忠) who was another son of Geng Jingmao.

The fourteenth daughter of Kangxi was wedded to Sun Chengen, the son of Sun Sike (Sun Ssu-k'o) (孫思克), a Han bannerman.

=== Korea ===
Silla had a practice that limited the succession to the throne to members of the seonggol (or "sacred bone") rank. To maintain their "sacred bone" rank, members of this caste often intermarried with one another in the same fashion that European royals intermarried to maintain a "pure" royal pedigree.

After the Qing invasion, Joseon was forced to give several of their princesses as concubines to the Qing regent Dorgon. In 1650, Dorgon married the Princess Uisun. She was from a collateral branch of the royal family, a daughter of Yi Gae-yun (李愷胤). Dorgon married two Korean princesses at Lianshan.

=== Japan ===
The Japanese may not have seen intermarriage between them and the imperial famiy of Korea as damaging to their prestige either. According to the Shoku Nihongi, an imperially commissioned record of Japanese history completed in 797, Emperor Kanmu (r. 781–806) was the son of a Korean concubine, Takano no Niigasa, who was descended from King Muryeong of Baekje (one of the Three Kingdoms of Korea).

In 1920, Crown Prince Un married Princess Masako of Nashimoto and, in May 1931, Yi Geon, a grandson of Gojong of Korea, was married to Matsudaira Yosiko, a cousin of Princess Masako. The Japanese saw these marriages as a way to secure their colonial rule over Korea and introduce Japanese blood into the Korean House of Yi.

== Europe ==
While the contemporary Western ideal sees marriage as a unique bond between two people who are in love, families in which heredity is central to power or inheritance (such as royal families) have often seen marriage in a different light. There are often political or other non-romantic functions that must be served and the relative wealth and power of the potential spouses may be considered. Marriage for political, economic, or diplomatic reasons, the marriage of state, was a pattern seen for centuries among European rulers.

=== Ancient Rome ===
While Roman emperors almost always married wives who were also Roman citizens, the ruling families of the empire's client kingdoms in the Near East and North Africa often contracted marriages with other royal houses to consolidate their position. These marriages were often contracted with the approval, or even at the behest, of the Roman emperors themselves. Rome thought that such marriages promoted stability among their client states and prevented petty local wars that would disturb the Pax Romana. Glaphyra of Cappadocia was known to have contracted three such royal intermarriages: with Juba II&I, King of Numidia and Mauretania, Alexander of Judea and Herod Archelaus, Ethnarch of Samaria.

Other examples from the Ancient Roman era include:

- Polemon II, King of Pontus and Berenice of Judea
- Aristobulus IV of Judea and Berenice of Judea
- Aristobulus Minor of Judea and Iotapa of Emesa

=== Byzantine Empire ===
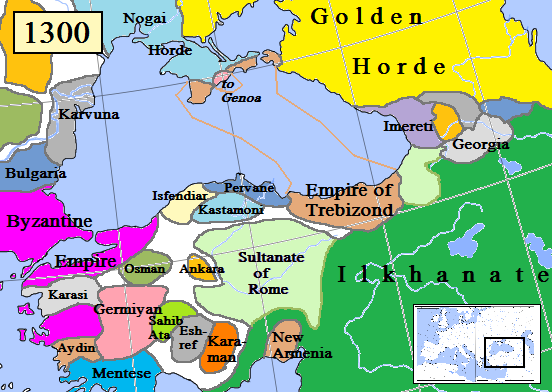
At the turn of the 14th century, Anatolia and the surrounding areas were a patchwork of small, independent states. Marriage was seen as an important way to maintain alliances.

Though some emperors, such as Justin I and Justinian I, took low-born wives, (Note: Justin I's wife, Euphemia, was reported to be both a slave and a barbarian, and Justinian I's wife, Theodora, was an actress and reputed prostitute.) dynastic intermarriages in imperial families were not unusual in the Byzantine Empire. Following the fall of Constantinople in 1204, the ruling families, the Laskarides and then the Palaiologoi, thought it prudent to marry into foreign dynasties. One early example is the marriage of John Doukas Vatatzes with Constance, the daughter of Emperor Frederick II of the Holy Roman Empire, to seal their alliance. After establishing an alliance with the Mongols in 1263, Michael VIII Palaiologos married two of his daughters to Mongol khans to cement their agreement: his daughter Euphrosyne Palaiologina was married to Nogai Khan of the Golden Horde, and his daughter Maria Palaiologina, was married to Abaqa Khan of the Ilkhanate. Later in the century, Andronikos II Palaiologos agreed to marital alliances with Ghazan of the Ilkhanate and Toqta and Uzbeg of the Golden Horde, which were quickly followed by their marriages to his daughters.

The Grand Komnenoi of the Empire of Trebizond were famed for marrying their daughters to their neighbours as acts of diplomacy. (Note: Donald MacGillivray Nicol says in The Last Centuries of Byzantium 1261–1453: "The daughters of Alexios II Grand Komnenos married the emirs of Sinope and of Erzindjan, his granddaughters married the emir of Chalybia and the Turkoman chieftain of the so-called Ak-Koyunlu, or horde of the White Sheep; his great-granddaughters, the children of Alexios III, who died in 1390, performed even greater service to the Empire.") Theodora Megale Komnene, daughter of John IV, was married to Uzun Hassan, lord of the Aq Qoyunlu, to seal an alliance between the Empire and the so-called White Sheep. Although the alliance failed to save Trebizond from its eventual defeat, and despite being a devout Christian in a Muslim state, Theodora did manage to exercise a pervasive influence both in the domestic and foreign actions of her husband.

Though usually made to strengthen the position of the empire, there are examples of interdynastic marriages destabilising the emperor's authority. When Emperor Andronikos II Palaiologos married his second wife, Eirene of Montferrat, in 1284 she caused a division in the Empire over her demand that her own sons share in imperial territory with, Michael, his son from his first marriage. She resorted to leaving Constantinople, the capital of the Byzantine Empire, and setting up her own court in the second city of the Empire, Thessalonica.

=== Medieval and early modern Europe ===
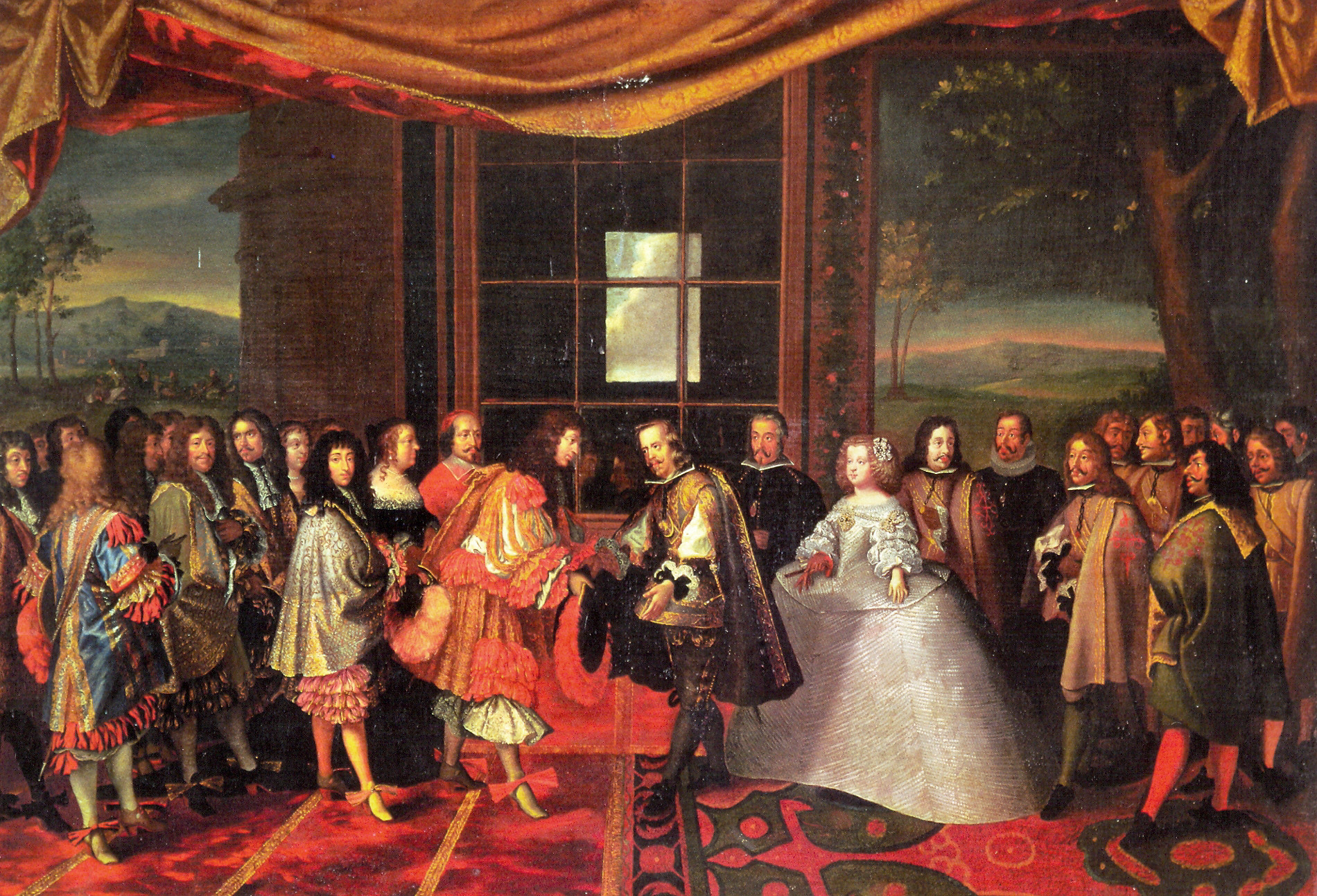
Louis XIV of France and Philip IV of Spain meeting at the Isle of Pheasants for the signing of the Treaty of the Pyrenees, which, in part, arranged the marriage of Louis with Philip's daughter Maria Theresa.

Careful selection of a spouse was important to maintain the royal status of a family: depending on the law of the land in question, if a prince or king was to marry a commoner who had no royal blood, even if the first-born was acknowledged as a son of a sovereign, he might not be able to claim any of the royal status of his father.

Traditionally, many factors were important in arranging royal marriages. One such factor was the amount of territory that the other royal family governed or controlled. Another, related factor was the stability of the control exerted over that territory: when there was territorial instability in a royal family, other royalty would be less inclined to marry into that family. Another factor was political alliance: marriage was an important way to bind together royal families and their countries during peace and war and could justify many important political decisions.

The increase in royal intermarriage often meant that lands passed into the hands of foreign houses, when the nearest heir was the son of a native dynasty and a foreign royal. (Note: The crowns of the kingdoms of Aragon and Castile came under Habsburg rule when they were inherited by Charles V, Holy Roman Emperor, son of Joanna, Queen of Castile and Aragon and Philip the Handsome, son of Maximilian I, Holy Roman Emperor.) Given the success of the Habsburgs' territorial acquisition-via-inheritance, a motto came to be associated with their dynasty: Bella gerant alii, tu, felix Austria, nube! ("Let others wage war. You, happy Austria, marry!")

Monarchs sometimes went to great lengths to prevent this. On her marriage to Louis XIV of France, Maria Theresa, daughter of Philip IV of Spain, was forced to renounce her claim to the Spanish throne. When monarchs or heirs apparent wed other monarchs or heirs, special agreements, sometimes in the form of treaties, were negotiated to determine inheritance rights. The marriage contract of Philip II of Spain and Mary I of England, for example, stipulated that the maternal possessions, as well as Burgundy and the Low Countries, were to pass to any future children of the couple, whereas the remaining paternal possessions (including Spain, Naples, Sicily, Milan) would first of all go to Philip's son Don Carlos, from his previous marriage to Maria Manuela of Portugal. If Carlos were to die without any descendants, only then would they pass to the children of his second marriage. On the other hand, the Franco-Scottish treaty that arranged the 1558 marriage of Mary, Queen of Scots and Francis, the son and heir of Henry II of France, had it that if the queen died without descendants, Kingdom of Scotland would fall to the throne of Kingdom of France.

Religion has always been closely tied to European political affairs, and as such it played an important role during marriage negotiations. The 1572 wedding in Paris of the French princess Margaret of Valois to the leader of France's Huguenots, Henry III of Navarre, was ostensibly arranged to effect a rapprochement between the nation's Catholics and Protestants, but proved a ruse for the St. Bartholomew's Day massacre. After the English Reformation, matches between English monarchs and Roman Catholic princesses were often unpopular, especially so when the prospective queen consort was unwilling to convert, or at least practice her faith discreetly. (Note: A prime example is the marriage of the Catholic Henrietta Maria and Charles I of England. Her open practice of her faith and insistence on maintaining a Catholic retinue during a time of religious intolerance in English society eventually made her a deeply unpopular queen with the general public.) Passage of the Act of Settlement 1701 disinherited any heir to the throne who married a Catholic. Other ruling houses, such as the Romanovs (Note: Russian dynasts often only married foreign princesses when they converted to Russian Orthodoxy. For example, Alix of Hesse, wife of Nicholas II, converted from her native Lutheranism.) and Habsburgs, have at times also insisted on dynastic marriages only being contracted with people of a certain faith or those willing to convert. When in 1926 Astrid of Sweden married Leopold III of Belgium, it was agreed that her children would be raised as Catholics but she was not required to give up Lutheranism, although she did eventually choose to convert in 1930. Some potential matches were abandoned due to irreconcilable religious differences. For example, plans for the marriage of the Catholic Władysław IV Vasa and the Lutheran Elisabeth of Bohemia, Princess Palatine proved unpopular with Poland's largely Catholic nobility and were quietly dropped.

Marriages among ruling dynasties and their subjects have at times been common, with such alliances as that of King Edward the Confessor of England with Edith of Wessex and Władysław II Jagiełło, King of Poland with Elizabeth Granowska being far from unheard of in medieval Europe. However, as dynasties approached absolutism and sought to preserve loyalty among competing members of the nobility, most eventually distanced themselves from kinship ties to local nobles by marrying abroad. Marriages with subjects brought the king back down to the level of those he ruled, often stimulating the ambition of his consort's family and evoking jealousy—or disdain—from the nobility. The notion that monarchs should marry into the dynasties of other monarchs to end or prevent war was, at first, a policy driven by pragmatism. During the era of absolutism, this practice contributed to the notion that it was socially, as well as politically, disadvantageous for members of ruling families to intermarry with their subjects and pass over the opportunity for marriage into a foreign dynasty.

=== Late modern and contemporary Europe ===
As a result of dynastic intra-marriage all of Europe's reigning hereditary monarchs descend from a common ancestor: Louis IX of Hesse-Darmstadt and his wife Countess Palatine Caroline of Zweibrücken.

Among Europe's current kings, queens and heirs apparent, only Alois, Hereditary Prince of Liechtenstein married a member of a foreign dynasty, as did the abdicated Juan Carlos I of Spain. (Note: Juan Carlos I of Spain married Princess Sophia of Greece and Denmark, a member of the Greek royal family. In 1993, Alois, Hereditary Prince of Liechtenstein married Duchess Sophie in Bavaria, a member of the House of Wittelsbach.)

Examples of late modern and contemporary royal intermarriage between members of reigning royal families include:

- Prince Nikolaus of Liechtenstein and Princess Margaretha of Luxembourg (1982)
- Constantine II of Greece and Princess Anne-Marie of Denmark (1964)
- Hereditary Grand Duke Jean of Luxembourg and Princess Joséphine-Charlotte of Belgium (1953)
- Princess Elizabeth of the United Kingdom and Prince Philip of Greece and Denmark (1947)
- Peter II of Yugoslavia and Princess Alexandra of Greece and Denmark (1944)
- Crown Prince Frederik of Denmark and Princess Ingrid of Sweden (1935)
- Prince George, Duke of Kent, and Princess Marina of Greece and Denmark (1934)
- Boris III of Bulgaria and Princess Giovanna of Italy (1930)
- Umberto, Prince of Piedmont, and Princess Marie José of Belgium (1930)
- Crown Prince Olav of Norway and Princess Märtha of Sweden (1929)
- Prince Leopold, Duke of Brabant, and Princess Astrid of Sweden (1926)
- Alexander I of Yugoslavia and Princess Maria of Romania (1922)

Additionally, examples of contemporary royal intermarriage that involve members of a non-reigning royal family include:

- Archduchess Gabriella of Austria and Prince Henri of Bourbon-Parma (2020)
- Princess Caroline of Monaco and Ernst August, Prince of Hanover (1999)
- Alois, Hereditary Prince of Liechtenstein, and Duchess Sophie in Bavaria (1993)
- Princess Astrid of Belgium and Archduke Lorenz of Austria-Este (1984)
- Princess Marie-Astrid of Luxembourg and Archduke Carl Christian of Austria (1982)
- Princess Barbara of Liechtenstein and Prince Alexander of Yugoslavia (1973)
- Princess Benedikte of Denmark and Richard, Hereditary Prince of Sayn-Wittgenstein-Berleburg (1968)
- Princess Irene of the Netherlands and Prince Carlos Hugo of Parma (1964)
- Princess Sophia of Greece and Denmark and Juan Carlos, Prince of Asturias (1962)
- Princess Birgitta of Sweden and Prince Johann Georg of Hohenzollern (1961)
- Princess Alix of Luxembourg and Prince Antoine de Ligne (1950)

== Muslim world ==
=== Al-Andalus ===
From the time of the Umayyad conquest of Hispania and throughout the Reconquista, marriage between Spanish and Umayyad royals was not uncommon. Early marriages, such as that of Abd al-Aziz ibn Musa and Egilona at the turn of the 8th century, was thought to help establish the legitimacy of Muslim rule on the Iberian Peninsula. Later instances of intermarriage were often made to seal trade treaties between Christian kings and Muslim caliphs.

=== Ottoman Empire ===
The marriages of Ottoman sultans and their sons in the fourteenth and fifteenth centuries tended to be with members of the ruling dynasties of neighbouring powers. With little regard for religion, the sultans contracted marriages with both Christians and Muslims; the purpose of these royal intermarriages were purely tactical. Christian consorts of Ottoman sultans include Theodora Kantakouzene of Byzantium, Kera Tamara of Bulgaria and Olivera Despina of Serbia. These Christian states along with Muslim beyliks of Germiyan, Saruhan, Karaman and Dulkadir were all potential enemies, and marriage was seen as a way of securing alliances with them. Marriage with foreign dynasties seems to have ceased in 1504, with the last marriage of a sultan to a foreign princess being that of Murad II and Mara Branković, daughter of the Serbian ruler Đurađ Branković, in 1435. By this time, the Ottomans had consolidated their power in the area and absorbed or subjugated many of their former rivals, and so marriage alliances were no longer seen as important to their foreign policy.

The Islamic principle of kafa'a discourages the marriages of women to men of differing religion or of inferior status. (Note: Carolyn Fluehr-Lobban explains in her article Islamic Law and Society in the Sudan that "It is preferable that a non-Muslim convert to Islam before marriage to a Muslim man, however, it is not essential – it is essential that a non-Muslim man convert to Islam before contemplating marriage with a Muslim woman") Neighbouring Muslim powers did not start to give their daughters in marriage to Ottoman princes until the fifteenth century, when they were seen to have grown in importance. This same principle meant that, while Ottoman men were free to marry Christian women, Muslim princesses were prevented from marrying Christian princes.

From Mehmed II the Ottoman sultans stopped marrying free women. The royal line was henceforth propagated by unmarried slave concubines.

=== 20th and 21st centuries ===
Examples of royal intermarriage include:

- Sheik Khalid bin Hamad Al Khalifa, son of Hamad Al Khalifa, King of Bahrain and Princess Sahab bint Abdullah, daughter of Abdullah, King of Saudi Arabia (2011)
- Sheikh Mohammed bin Rashid Al Maktoum of Dubai and Princess Haya bint Hussein of Jordan (2004)
- Mohammad Reza Pahlavi of Iran and Princess Fawzia Fuad of Egypt (1939)
- Azam Jah and Princess Durru Shehvar, daughter of Abdul Mejid II
- Dürrüşehvar Sultan (daughter of Ottoman Caliph Abdulmejid II) and Azam Jah (son of Nizam of Hyderabad Asaf Jah VII) (1931)

== Oceania ==
=== Hawaii ===
Royal incest was extremely common in the Kingdom of Hawaii and its predecessors, despite being rare in other Polynesian societies. Among the aliʻi, the ruling class, marriage between blood relatives of the first degree was believed to produce children with the highest rank under the kapu system, equal to that of the gods. A marriage between brother and sister was considered "the most perfect and revered union". It was believed that the mana of a particular aliʻi could be increased by incestuous unions. According to O. A. Bushnell, "in several accounts about Hawaiians, an ali'i who was the issue of an incestuous marriage [...] was noted for a splendid body and a superior intelligence". Writers have suggested that this preference for brother–sister incest came about as a way to protect the royal bloodline. Notable instances of incestuous relationships among Hawaiian royalty were those between King Kamehameha II and his half-sister Kamāmalu, which was a fully fledged marriage, and between Kamehameha III and his full sister Nāhiʻenaʻena. In the latter case, the siblings had hoped to marry but their union was opposed by Christian missionaries.

== Morganatic marriage ==
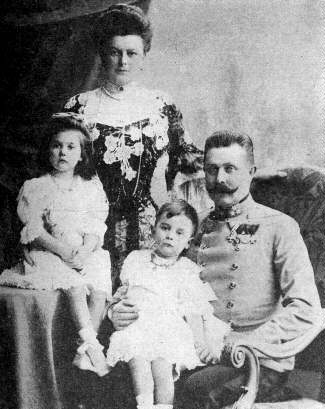
Archduke Franz Ferdinand of Austria and his morganatic wife, Countess Sophie Chotek, with their children, Sophie and Maximilian.

At one time, some dynasties adhered strictly to the concept of royal intermarriage. The Habsburgs, Sicilian and Spanish Bourbons, and Romanovs, among others, introduced house laws which governed dynastic marriages; it was considered important that dynasts marry social equals (i.e., other royalty), thereby ruling out even the highest-born non-royal nobles. Those dynasts who contracted undesirable marriages often did so morganatically. Generally, this is a marriage between a man of high birth and a woman of lesser status (such as a daughter of a low-ranked noble family or a commoner). Usually, neither the bride nor any children of the marriage has a claim on the bridegroom's succession rights, titles, precedence, or entailed property. The children are considered legitimate for all other purposes and the prohibition against bigamy applies.

Examples of morganatic marriages include:

- Grand Duke Konstantin Pavlovich of Russia and Countess Joanna Grudna-Grudzińska (1796)
- Duke Alexander of Württemberg and Countess Claudine Rhédey von Kis-Rhéde (1835)
- Prince Alexander of Hesse and by Rhine and Countess Julia Hauke (1851)
- Archduke Franz Ferdinand of Austria and Countess Sophie Chotek von Chotkova und Wognin (1900)

== Inbreeding ==
Over time in Europe, because of the relatively limited number of potential consorts, the gene pool of many ruling families grew progressively smaller, until all royalty was related. This also resulted in many being descended from a certain person through many lines of descent, such as the numerous European royalty descended from Queen Victoria and/or King Christian IX.

Examples of incestuous marriages and the impact of inbreeding on royal families include:

- Most rulers of the Ptolemaic dynasty from Ptolemy II were married to their brothers and sisters, in order to keep the Ptolemaic blood "pure" and to strengthen the line of succession. Cleopatra VII (also called Cleopatra VI) and Ptolemy XIII, who married and became co-rulers of ancient Egypt following their father's death, are the most widely known example.
- Jean V of Armagnac was said to have formed a rare brother-sister liaison, left descendants and claimed to be married. There is no evidence that this "marriage" was contracted for dynastic rather than personal reasons.
- The House of Habsburg frequently practiced consanguine marriages as a way of consolidating the dynasty's political power, with both first cousin and uncle–niece pairings common. The most visible consequence of this was an extended lower chin (mandibular prognathism), which was typical for many Habsburg relatives over a period of six centuries; the jaw deformity is so closely associated with the family that it is commonly known as the "Habsburg jaw" or "Habsburg lip". The Spanish branch took this practice to an extreme: of the eleven marriages contracted by Spanish monarchs between 1450 and 1661, nine contained some element of consanguinity. The last of the Spanish line, Charles II, who was severely disabled from birth and possibly impotent, possessed a genome comparable to that of a child born to a brother and sister.
- Several family members of the House of Wittelsbach experienced mental health and physical conditions, as well as epilepsy. This is often attributed to their frequent intermarriages.

== See also ==
- Haemophilia in European royalty
- Transcontinental royal intermarriage

== Footnotes ==
=== References ===
- Albany, HRH Prince Michael of; Salhab, Walid Amine (2006). The Knights Templar of the Middle East (1st ed.). MA, USA: Weister Books. ISBN 978-1-57863-346-3.
- Alexander, Harriet (31 August 2013). "Andrea Casiraghi, second in line to Monaco's throne, weds Colombian heiress". The Telegraph.
- Anselme, Père (1967). Histoire de la Maison Royale de France (in French). Vol. I. Paris: Editions du Palais-Royal. p. 145.
- deBadts de Cugnac, Chantal; Coutant de Saisseval, Guy (2002). Le Petit Gotha [The Little Gotha] (in French). Paris, France: Nouvelle Imprimerie Laballery. ISBN 978-2-9507974-3-8.
- "Act of Settlement 1700". BAILII. n.d.
- Ball, Warwick (2000). Rome in the East: The Transformation of an Empire. New York, USA: Routledge. ISBN 978-0-415-24357-5.
- Beeche, Arturo (2009). The Gotha: Still a Continental Royal Family, Vol. 1. Richmond, US: Kensington House Books. ISBN 978-0-9771961-7-3.
- Beeche, Arturo (2010). The Grand Dukes. Berkeley, CA, US: Eurohistory. ISBN 978-0-9771961-8-0.
- Bevan, E.R. "House of Ptolomey, The". uchicago.edu.
- "Biographies: HRH Princess Haya". Office of HRH Princess Haya Bint Al Hussein. n.d. Archived from the original on 4 October 2015.
- Bryer, Anthony (1975). "Greeks and Türkmens: The Pontic Exception". Dumbarton Oaks Papers. 29: 113–148. doi:10.2307/1291371. JSTOR 1291371.
- Bucholz, Robert; Key, Newton (2009). Early Modern England 1485–1714: A Narrative History. Oxford: John Wiley & Sons. ISBN 978-1-4051-6275-3.
- Cecil, Lamar (1996). Wilhelm II: Emperor and exile, 1900–1941. North Carolina, US: The University of North Carolina Press. ISBN 978-0-8078-2283-8.
- de Ferdinandy, Michael (n.d.). "Charles V". Encyclopædia Britannica.
- Christakes, George (2010). Integrative Problem-Solving in a Time of Decadence. Springer. p. 437. ISBN 978-90-481-9889-4.
- Cohen, Raymond; Vestbrook, Raymond (2000). Amarna Diplomacy: The Beginnings of International Relations. Baltimore: JHU Press. ISBN 978-0-8018-6199-4.
- Curtis, Benjamin (2013). The Habsburgs: The History of a Dynasty. London, UK: Bloomsbury Publishing Inc. ISBN 978-1-4411-5002-8.
- Czaplinski, Władysław (1976). Władysław IV i jego czasy [Władysław IV and His Times] (in Polish). Warsaw, Poland: Wiedza Poweszechna.
- Diesbach, Ghislain (1967). Secrets of the Gotha: Private Lives of Royal Families of Europe. London, UK: Chapman & Hall. ISBN 978-3-928741-20-0.
- Dobbs, David (2011). "The Risks and Rewards of Royal Incest". National Geographic Magazine. Archived from the original on 23 August 2010.
- Dodson, Aidan; Hilton, Dyan (2004). The Complete Royal Families of Ancient Egypt. Thames & Hudson.
- Durant, Will (1950). The Story of Civilization: The Age of Faith. Vol. IV. New York, USA: Simone and Schuster. ISBN 978-1-4516-4761-7.
- Fleming, Patricia H. (1973). "The Politics of Marriage Among Non-Catholic European Royalty". Current Anthropology. 14 (3): 231–249. doi:10.1086/201323. JSTOR 2740765. S2CID 144634148.
- Fletcher, Joann (2000). Chronicle of a Pharaoh – The Intimate Life of Amenhotep III. Oxford University Press. ISBN 978-0-19-521660-8.
- Fluehr-Lobban, Carolyn (1987). "Islamic Law and Society in the Sudan". Islamic Studies. 26 (3) (3 ed.). Islamabad, Pakistan: Islamic Research Institute, International Islamic University: 280–282. JSTOR 20839848.
- Frassetto, Michael (2003). Encyclopedia of Barbarian Europe: Society in Transformation. California, US: ABC-CLIO Ltd. ISBN 978-1-57607-263-9.
- Garland, Lynda (2002). Byzantine Empresses: Women and Power in Byzantium AD 527–1204. Oxford, UK: Routledge. ISBN 978-1-134-75639-1.
- Grajetzki, Wolfram (2005). Ancient Egyptian Queens: A Hieroglyphic Dictionary. London: Golden House Publications. ISBN 978-0-9547218-9-3.
- Greenfeld, Liah (1993). Nationalism: Five Roads to Modernity. USA: Harvard University Press. ISBN 978-0-674-60319-6.
- Griffey, Erin (2008). Henrietta Maria: piety, politics and patronage. Aldershot, UK: Ashgate Publishing. ISBN 978-0-7546-6420-8.
- Haag, Michael (2003). The Rough Guide History of Egypty. London, UK: Rough Guides Ltd. ISBN 978-1-85828-940-3.
- Guyenne, Valois (2001). Incest and the Medieval Imagination. Oxford: Oxford University Press. ISBN 978-0-86193-226-9.
- Heimann, Heinz-Dieter (2010). Die Habsburger: Dynastie und Kaiserreiche [The Habsburgs: dynasty and empire] (in German). C.H.Beck. ISBN 978-3-406-44754-9.
- Jackson, Peter (2005). The Mongols and the West, 1221-1410. Harlow, UK: Pearson Longman. ISBN 978-0-582-36896-5.
- Keller, Bill (1990). "Zulu King Breaks Ties To Buthelezi". The New York Times.
- Kelly, Edmond (1991). Revolutionary Ethiopia: From Empire to People's Republic. Bloomington, US: Indiana University Press. ISBN 978-0-253-20646-6.
- Kim, Jinwung (2012). A History of Korea: From "Land of the Morning Calm" to States in Conflict. University of Indiana Press. ISBN 978-0-253-00024-8.
- Kobo, Ousman (2012). Unveiling Modernity in Twentieth-Century West African Islamic Reforms. Leiden, Netherlands: Kononklijke Brill. ISBN 978-90-04-23313-3.
- Kowner, Rotem (2012). Race and Racism in Modern East Asia: Western and Eastern Constructions. Leiden: Brill. ISBN 978-90-04-23729-2.
- Lee Jen-der (2014), "Crime and Punishment: The Case of Liu Hui in the Wei Shu", Early Medieval China: A Sourcebook, New York: Columbia University Press, pp. 156–165, ISBN 978-0-231-15987-6.
- Liu, Caitlin; Perry, Tony (2004). "Thais Saddened by the Death of Young Prince". LA Times.
- "Life Goes to a Twice Royal Wedding: Luxembourg Prince Marries a Princess". Life. 1953.
- Macurdy, Grace H.; Forrer, Leonard (1993). Two Studies on Women in Antiquity. Illinois, US: Ares Publishers. ISBN 978-0-89005-543-4.
- Magill, Frank (2014). The 20th Century: Dictionary of World Biography. Vol. 8. London, UK: Routledge. ISBN 978-1-317-74060-5.
- Maland, David (1991). Europe in the Seventeenth Century (Second ed.). London, UK: Macmillan. ISBN 978-0-333-33574-1.
- Mandelstam Balzer, Marjorie (2010). Religion and Politics in Russia. New York, US: M.E. Sharpe, Inc. ISBN 978-0-7656-2414-7.
- Montgomery-Massingberd, Hugh (1973). Burke's Guide to the Royal Family. London, UK: Burke's Peerage Limited. ISBN 978-0-220-66222-6.
- Morgan Gilman, Florence (2003). Herodias: At Home in that Fox's Den. US: Liturgical Press. ISBN 978-0-8146-5108-7.
- Nicol, Donald MacGillivray (2004). The Last Centuries of Byzantium 1261–1453. Cambridge, UK: Cambridge University Press. ISBN 978-0-521-43991-6.
- Opeyemi, Oladunjo (6 December 2013). "Nelson Mandela: A Unique World Leader Dies At 95". Nigerian Echo. Archived from the original on 8 December 2013.
- Ostrogorsky, George (1969). History of the Byzantine State. New Brunswick, Canada: Rutgers University Press. ISBN 978-0-521-43991-6.
- Owens, Karen (2013). Franz Joseph and Elisabeth: The Last Great Monarchs of Austria-Hungary. North Carolina, US: McFarland & Co Inc. ISBN 978-0-7864-7674-9.
- Peirce, Leslie P. (1994). The Imperial Harem: Women and Sovereignty in the Ottoman Empire. Oxford, UK: Oxford University Press. ISBN 978-0-19-508677-5.
- Prazmowska, Anita (2011) [2004]. A History of Poland (2 ed.). New York, US: Palgrave Macmillan. ISBN 978-0-230-25235-6.
- "Prince Muhammed Ali of Egypt and Princess Noal Zaher of Afghanistan Prepare for their Royal Wedding". Hello!. 2013.
- "Princess Astrid". The Belgian Monarchy. n.d.
- Qingzhi Zhao, George (2008). Marriage as Political Strategy and Cultural Expression: Mongolian Royal Marriages from World Empire to Yuan Dynasty. New York: Peter Lang. ISBN 978-1-4331-0275-2.
- Roller, Duane (1998). The Building Program of Herod the Great. California, US: University of California Press.
- Ruiz, Enrique (2009). Discriminate Or Diversify. Positivepsyche.Biz crop. ISBN 978-0-578-01734-1.
- Rushton, Alan R. (2008). Royal Maladies: Inherited Diseases in the Ruling Houses of Europe. BC, Canada: Trafford Publishing. ISBN 978-1-4251-6810-0.
- Salisbury, Joyce E. (2001). Encyclopedia of Women in the Ancient World. California, US: ABC-CLIO Inc. ISBN 978-1-57607-092-5.
- Sarma, Rani (2008). "Bella Vista". The Deodis of Hyderabad a Lost Heritage. New Delhi, Inda: Rupa Co. ISBN 978-81-291-2783-9.
- Schaus, Margaret (2006). Women and Gender in Medieval Europe: An Encyclopedia. New York, US: Routledge. ISBN 978-1-135-45960-4.
- Schürer, Emil; Millar, Fergus; Vermes, Geza (2014) [1973]. The History of the Jewish People in the Ages of Jesus Christ. Vol. 1. IL, US: Bloomsbury Publishing Plc.
- Smith, William (1860). Dictionary of Greek and Roman Biography and Mythology. Vol. 1. US: Harvard University. ISBN 978-1-84511-002-4.
- Stengs, Irene (2009). Worshipping the Great Moderniser: King Chulalongkporn, Patron Saint of the Thai Middle Class. Washington, US: University of Washington Press. ISBN 978-0-295-98917-4.
- Thailand Country Study Guide (4th ed.). Washington DC, US: International Business Publications USA. 2007. ISBN 978-1-4330-4919-4.
- Thornton, Michael (1986). Royal Feud: The Dark Side of the Love Story of the Century. New York, US: Random House Publishing. ISBN 978-0-345-33682-8.
- Thomas, Alastair H. (2010). The A to Z of Denmark. Washington DC, US: Scarecrow Press. ISBN 978-1-4616-7184-8.
- Thomson, David (1961). Europe Since Napoleon. New York: Knopf. ISBN 978-0-14-013561-9.
- "Topics in the History of Genetics and Molecular Biology: The Habsburg Lip". Michigan State University. 2000.
- "Tribute to mothers' caring nature". The Star. 2008. Archived from the original on 8 June 2011.
- "Queen Anne Marie". The Greek Monarchy. n.d. Archived from the original on 24 September 2015.
- Veit, Veronika (2007). The Role of Women in the Altaic World. Germany: Harrassowitz. ISBN 978-3-447-05537-6.
- Verlag, Starke (1997). Genealogisches Handbuch des Adels, Fürstliche Häuser XV [Genealogical Handbook of the nobility, Princely houses XV] (in German). ISBN 978-3-7980-0834-2.
- Verzijl, J. H. W. "International Law in Historical Perspective". Nova et Vetera Iuris Gentium. III.
- Vork, Justin (2012). Imperial Requiem: Four Royal Women and the Fall of the Age of Empires. Bloomington, US: iUniverse.com. ISBN 978-1-4759-1749-9.
- Walthall, Anne (2008). Servants of the Dynasty: Palace Women in World History. London: University of California Press. ISBN 978-0-520-25444-2.
- "Wedding Brings Xhosa, Zulu Tribes Together". Los Angeles Times. California. 2002.
- Wortman, Richard (2013). Scenarios of Power: Myth and Ceremony in Russian Monarchy from Peter the Great to the Abdication of Nicholas II. New Jersey, US: Princeton University Press. ISBN 978-1-4008-4969-7.
