= Chronicle P =

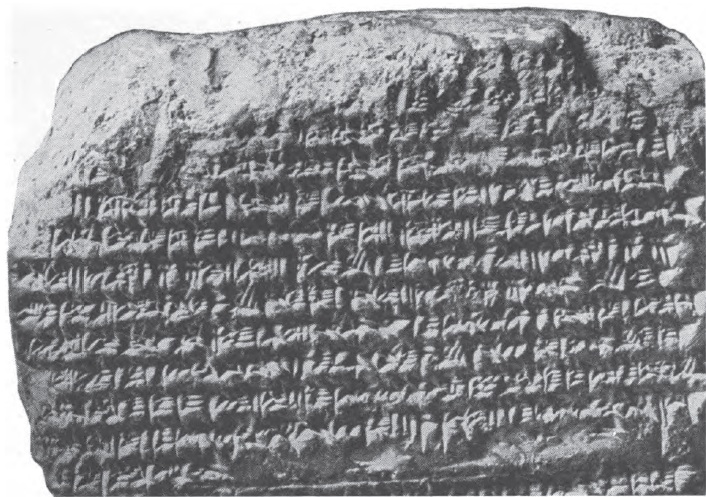
- A portion of Chronicle P referring to the events surrounding the reign of Tukulti-Ninurta I.
- Height: 12 cm
- Width: 18 cm
- Discovered: before 1882
- Present location: London, England, United Kingdom

Chronicle P, known as Chronicle 22 in Grayson’s Assyrian and Babylonian Chronicles and Mesopotamian Chronicle 45: "Chronicle of the Kassite Kings" in Glassner's Mesopotamian Chronicles is named for T. G. Pinches, the first editor of the text. It is a chronicle of the second half of the second millennium BC or the Kassite period, written by a first millennium BC Babylonian scribe.

== The tablet ==
The chronicle is preserved on a single fragment 180 mm wide and 120 mm long and is in fairly poor condition. It is the lower third of what was originally a large clay tablet inscribed with two columns of Akkadian cuneiform per side, and is held in the British Museum, now bearing the museum reference BM 92701. Its provenance is unknown but the internal evidence from the script characteristics betrays it to be a late Babylonian copy. It was purchased by the museum from Spartali & Co in 1882 and originally given the accession number 82-7-4, 38.

=== The text ===
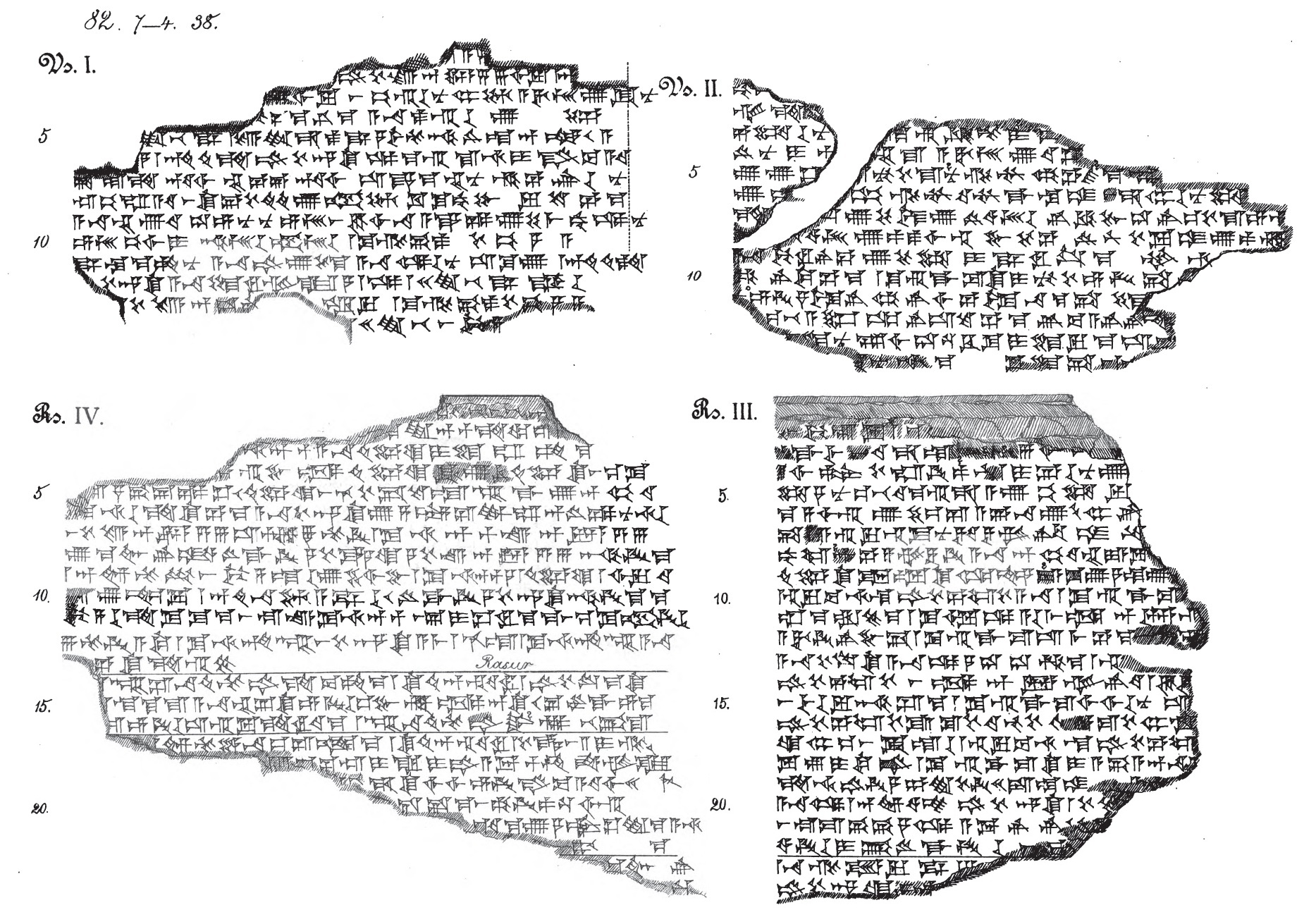
Hugo Winckler’s line art for the Chronicle P.

The text is episodic, divided by horizontal lines into sections of differing length concerning the events of particular reigns. The narrative style switches from classic chronicler to epic poem when describing the events of the reign of Kurigalzu II, suggesting more than one historical source was consulted in its preparation. Although the section concerning the deposing of the grandson of Aššur-uballiṭ I differs from the Assyrian Synchronistic History with respect to the names of the characters concerned, the identical phraseology suggests that the passages derive ultimately from a common source. Similarly, the section relating to Kurigalzu II and the battle of Sugagu varies only in the name of his Assyrian counterpart and the outcome of the battle.

The narrative begins with discussion of a treaty and some form of restoration work, but the identity of the protagonist (Burna-Buriyåš I?) is lost. It continues with a passage concerning Kadašman-Ḫarbe I that has been interpreted as a confusion of the history of this earlier king with that of Kara-ḫardaš, the short-lived successor to Burna-Buriaš II. Kurigalzu’s victory against the Elamites is likewise thought to confuse the campaign of Kurigalzu I with his later namesake. The history then hops to the events surrounding Tukulti-Ninurta’s conquest of Babylonia, providing the only extant confirmation of his seven year rule through governors. It records the revolt which placed Adad-šuma-uṣur on the throne and then describes the events surrounding Tukulti-Ninurta’s overthrow (by Aššur-nasir-apli, probably a reproduction of the error for Aššūr-nādin-apli on some copies of the Assyrian King List). The text concludes with two sections about the incursions of Elamite king Kidin-Ḫudrudiš, thought to represent Kidin-Hutran, against the Kassite monarchs Enlil-nādin-šumi and Adad-šuma-iddina, kings recorded as preceding Adad-šuma-uṣur on the Babylonian king list

The text is insufficiently preserved for it to be possible to ascertain its intended purpose. It contains a number of scribal errors, but, in marked contrast to the Synchronistic History, it portrays Babylonian setbacks as matter of fact alongside their victories, which has led some modern historians to praise its impartiality, despite its apparent muddling of historical events.

=== Principal publications ===
Despite its fragmentary state, the text has been published by scholars in the following publications:

- T. G. Pinches (1894). "The Babylonian Chronicle". Journal of the Royal Asiatic Society: 807–833. JSTOR 25197230.
- Hugo Winckler (1895). "Text der Chronik P". Altorientalische Forschungen: 297–303.
- L. W. King (1904). Records of the reign of Tukulti-Ninib I, King of Assyria, About B.C. 1275. Luzac and Co. pp. 51, 96–101, 157. relating to iv 1–13.
- Friedrich Delitzsch (1906). Die babylonische Chronik. B. G. Teibner. pp. 43–46.
- Ernst F. Weidner (1959). Die Inschriften Tukulti-Ninurtas I. [des Ersten] und seiner Nachfolger (Archiv für Orientforschung, Vol. 12). Biblio-Verlag. no. 37, relating to iv 1–13.
- A. K. Grayson (1975). Assyrian and Babylonian Chronicles. J. J. Augustin. pp. 139–41.
- Jean-Jacques Glassner (1993). Chroniques mésopotamiennes. La Roue à Livres. pp. 278–281.
