= Enlil-nirari =

- King of Assyria

King of the Middle Assyrian Empire
- Reign: 10 regnal years c. 1327–1318 BC
- Predecessor: Ashur-uballit I
- Successor: Arik-den-ili
- Issue: Arik-den-ili
- Father: Ashur-uballit I

Enlil-nirari (“Enlil is my helper”) was King of Assyria from c. 1327 BC to 1318 BC during the Middle Assyrian Empire. He was the son of Aššur-uballiṭ I. He was apparently the earliest king to have been identified as having held eponym, or limmu, office.

== Biography ==
He recorded on clay cones his repairs to a dilapidated stretch of the wall from the Craftsman’s Gate to the Sheep Gate around his capital, the city of Assur, now the tell-site of Qal’at Shergat which lies beside the Tigris. He proffered a prayer that future restorations would preserve his inscriptions.

His sister, Muballiṭat-Šērūa, was married to the Kassite king Burna-Buriaš II, and his nephews, Kara-ḫardaš and Kurigalzu would succeed to the Babylonian throne, separated by a short-lived revolt which was put down by Aššur-uballiṭ and the Assyrian army. Around this time, there is evidence of the exchange of gifts of textiles and votive ornaments between the Kassite and Assyrian ruling classes.

Despite their earlier close ties, he fought against Kurigalzu, who grew to become one of the mightiest and most belligerent kings of the Kassite dynasty, in the battle of Sugagu to establish the boundary between both states. The two extant chronicles which record the battle provide contradictory accounts of the outcome. The Assyrian version describes the division of land from Shasili of Subartu, which was a region thought to be northeast of Assyria and possibly their vassal during this time. A second battle may have taken place at Kilizi as recorded on a poorly preserved chronicle fragment, possibly dated to the limmu-year of Silli-Adad. This was a provincial town in Qasr Shamamok not far from modern Mosul.

== Funeral instructions ==
He had left very specific instructions in the event of a death in the royal family. If the passing took place when he was a few hours travel away, a sealed message should be sent, but if he was more distant, the wives of the palace were to mourn as prearranged and no message was necessary. A warning was given to those who might be tempted to spread the news without the assent of the head-steward, risking a no longer legible part of their anatomy (tongue?) to be amputated.

| Preceded by Ashur-uballit I | King of Assyria; 1327–1318 BC | Succeeded by Arik-den-ili |
