= Muballitat-Sherua =

- Years active: c. 1333 BC
- Parent: Ashur-uballit I

Muballitat-Sherua fl. c. 1333 BC) was a princess of Assyria, daughter of Ashur-uballit I.

== Biography ==
Muballitat-Sherua was a daughter of the Assyrian king Ashur-uballit I. Her father was the first to adopt the title king of Assyria. She may have married the Babylonian king Burna-Buriash II, who by that time had already been involved in royal intermarriage multiple times, sending several of his daughters to other courts. According to Amanda Podany, the Babylonian king was probably well into middle age by the time he married Muballitat-Sherua. By Burna-Buriash II she had Kara-hardash. He acceded to the Babylonian throne but was killed shortly thereafter during a rebellion. His death was later avenged by his own grandfather, the Assyrian king. Since Kara-hardash had been killed in the rebellion, the Assyrians placed on the Babylonian throne a certain Kurigalzu, who may have been Burnaburiash's son or grandson.

There is debate over whether Muballitat-Sherua married Burna-Buriash II or his son, that is Kara-hardash, as the historical sources don't agree. One source (Chronicle P) calls the son of Muballitat-Sherua (and Karaindash) Kadashman-Harbe, the father of Kurigalzu, according to this chronicle. The other primary source (the Synchronistic History), however, states that Kurigalzu was the son of Burnaburiash. However, this source could also be interpreted as expressing that the father of Kurigalzu was Kara-hardash. Kadashman-Harbe, then, could be another name for Kara-hardash. Neither source records explicitly who was the husband of Muballitat-Sherua.
