= Untash-Napirisha =

King of Elam
- Reign: circa 1300 BC
- Predecessor: Humban-Numena
- Successor: Kidin-Hutran
- Spouse: Napir-Asu
- Father: Humban-Numena
- Mother: Daughter (or granddaughter) of Kurigalzu

Untash-Napirisha was king of Elam (in present-day southwest Iran) during the Middle Elamite period, circa 1300 BCE. He was the son of the previous Elamite king, Humban-Numena and of a daughter (or granddaughter) of Kurigalzu. He was named after Napirisha, an Elamite deity.

He founded and built extensively a new city, Dur-Untash, 40 km SE of Susa, modern Chogha Zanbil. He built extensively in this city, and its main temple, the famous Ziggurat, still stands there. Although construction in this religious city complex abruptly ended after Untash-Napirisha's death, the site was not abandoned, but continued to be occupied until it was destroyed by the Assyrian king Ashurbanipal in 640 BC.

Untash-Napirirsha also left numerous building inscriptions for more than 50 temples and buildings, either built or renovated during his reign, in Chogha Zanbil, Susa, Choga Gotvand and other places.

He dedicated a statue of the god Immiriya in Chogha Zanbil to his father-in-law, the Babylonian Burnaburiash. (Note: In the dedication, the part of the text mentioning the Babylonian king is damaged. In François Vallat's opinion, shared by Daniel T. Potts, […-l]i-ia-áš should be read as [Bur-na]-bur-ia-áš; E. Reiner prefers a geographical interpretation, proposing [tup-l]i-ia-áš; according to other historians, the damaged text should be restored as [kaš-ti-l]i-ia-áš, actually referring to Kashtiliash IV.) A later Elamite letter from Berlin (Pergamon Museum VAT17020) mentions that he was married to “the daughter of Burna-buriash (a Babylonian king) and they had a son (and the future Elamite king) Kidin-hudurdish (Hutran)". If this was the Babylonian king Burna-Buriash II, then the reign of Untash-Napirisha could be dated ca. 1340–1300 BC. However, some scholars consider a different model for the synchronism between the Kassite dynasty in Babylon and the Elamite kings, and suggest that the mentioned Burna-buriash was a later prince, and that the reign of Untash-Napirisha could be dated c. 1275–1240 BC; see, for example The Berlin Letter, Middle Elamite Chronology and Sutruk-Nahhunte I's Genealogy.

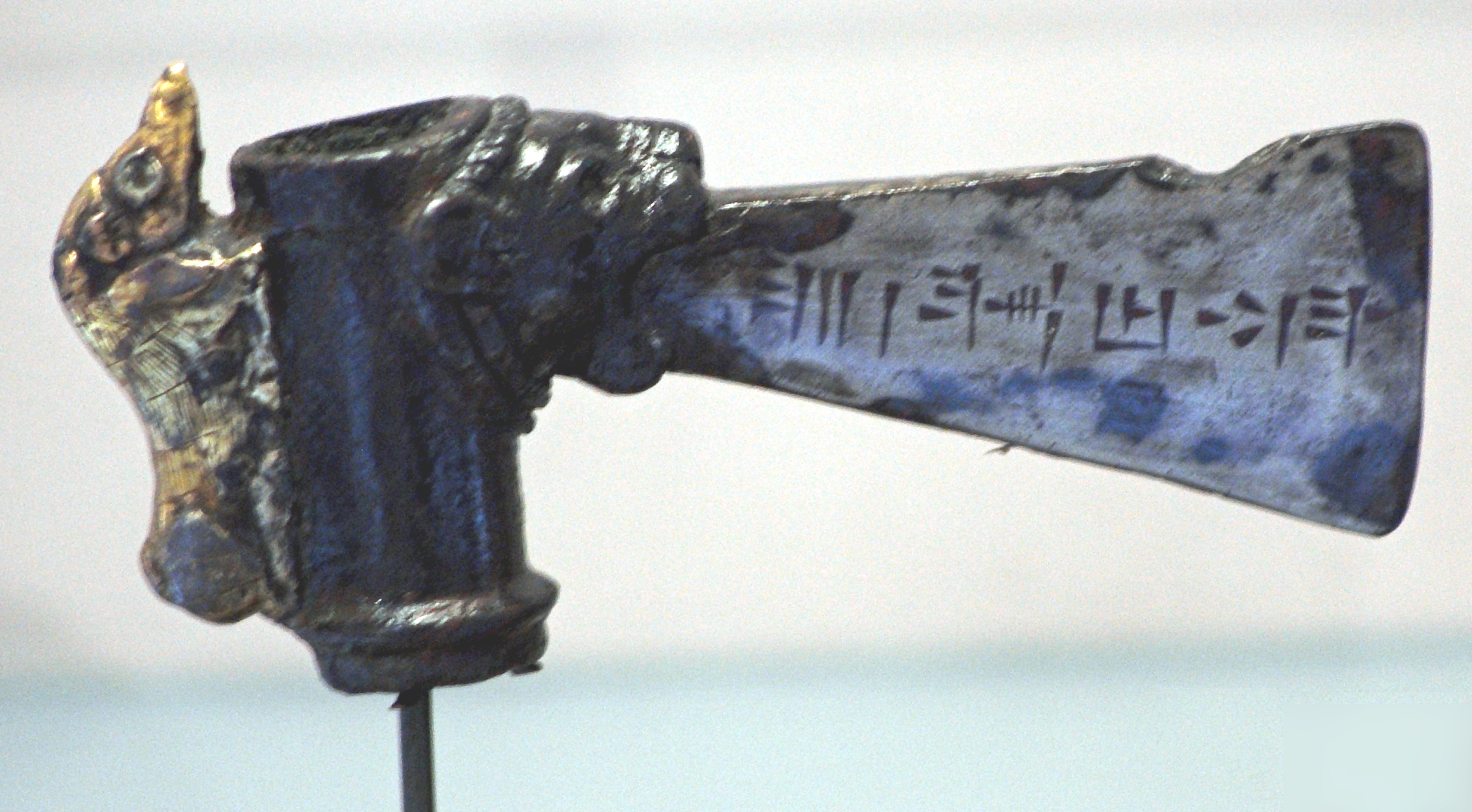
Axe bearing the name of the king Untash-Napirisha.

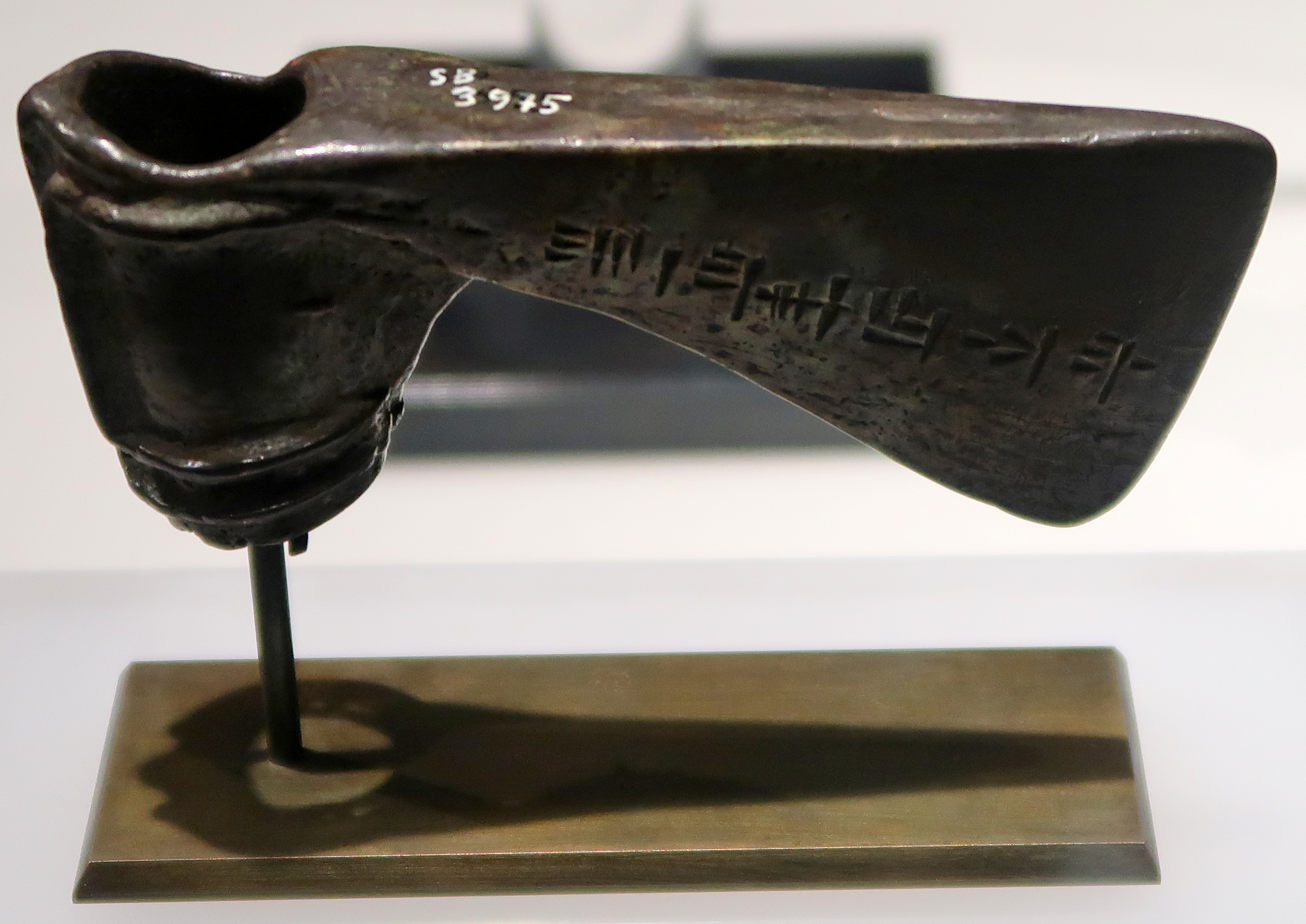
Axe inscribed with the name of King Untash-Napirisha

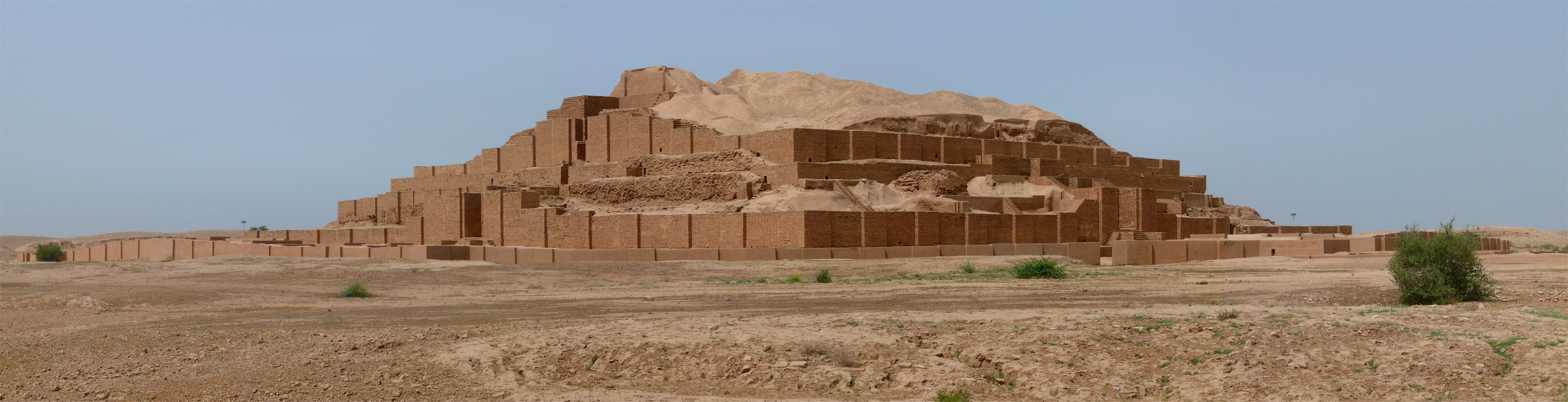
The Ziggurat at Chogha Zanbil was built by Untash-Napirisha.

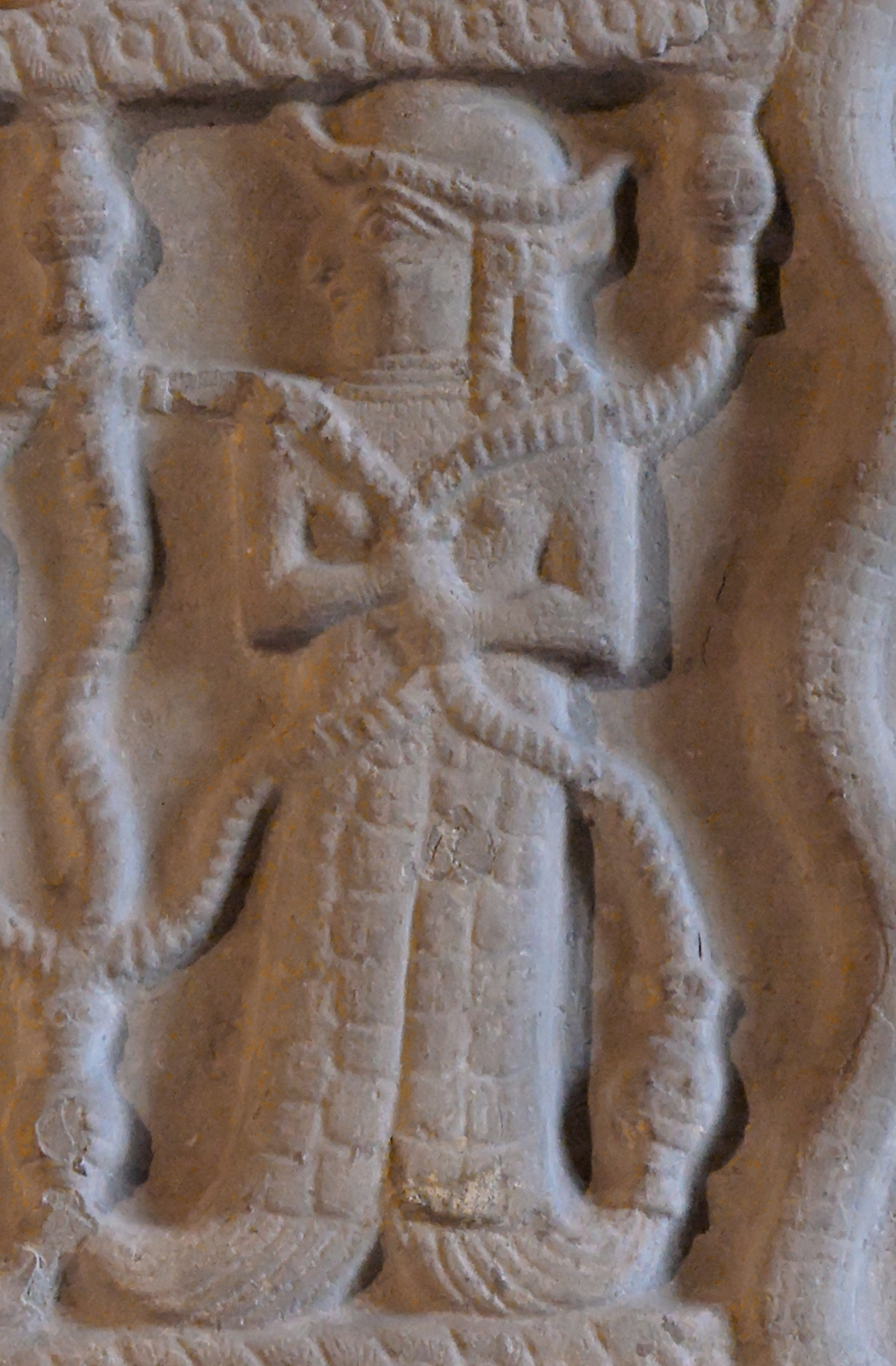
Fish-tailed deity holding snakes. Stele of Untash Napirisha, sandstone, ca. 1340–1300 BC, brought from Tchoga Zanbil to Susa in the 12th century BC.

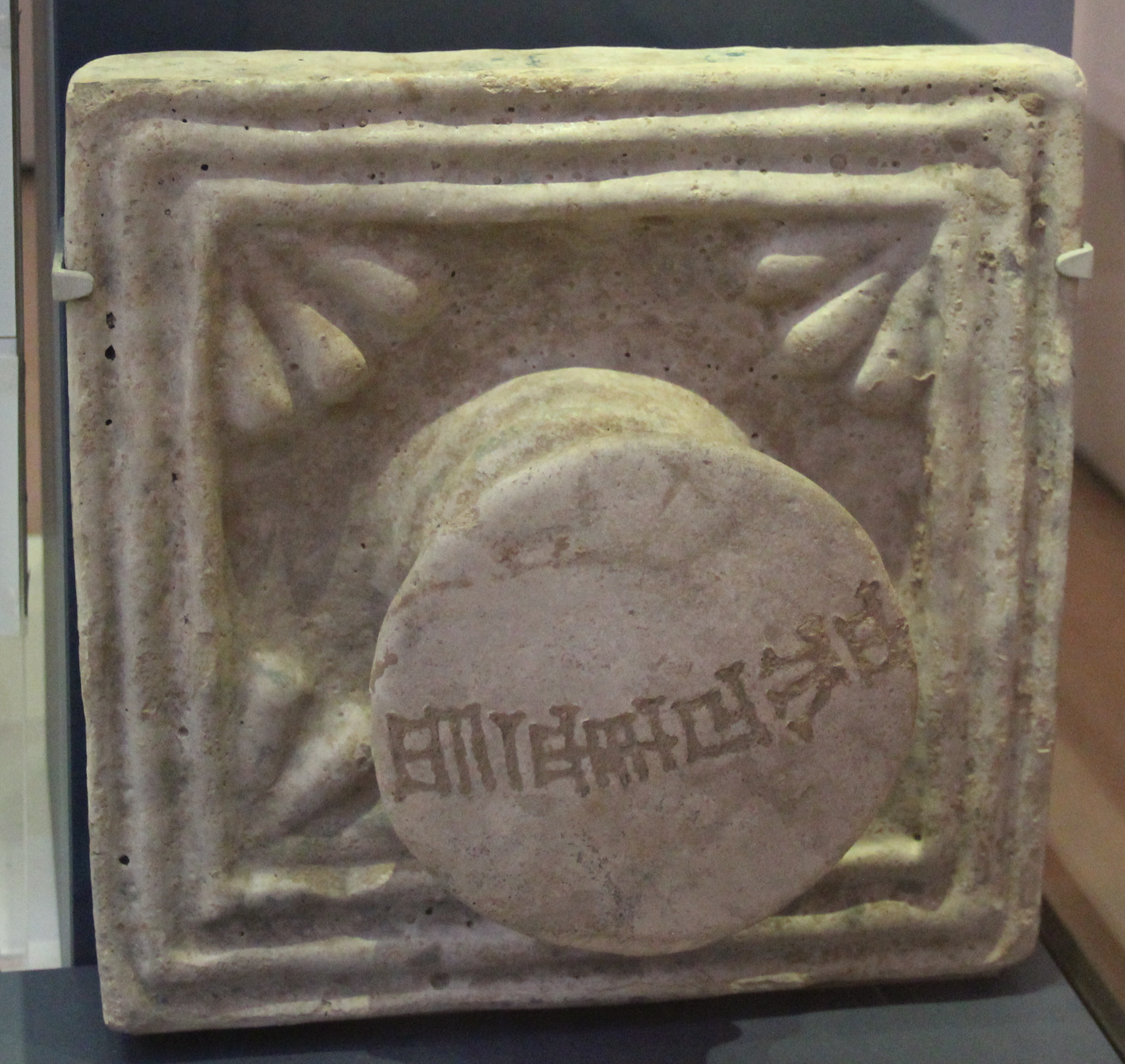
Plaque with inscription "Palace of Untash-Napirisha" from Chogha Zanbil

== Notes ==
Preceded by Humban-Numena	King of Elam; 1340–1300 BC	Succeeded by Kidin-Hutran
