= Burna-Buriash II =

King of Babylon
- Reign: c. 1360 – c. 1333 BC
- Predecessor: Kadashman-Enlil I
- Successor: Kara-hardash
- Died: c. 1333 BC
- Issue: Kara-hardash

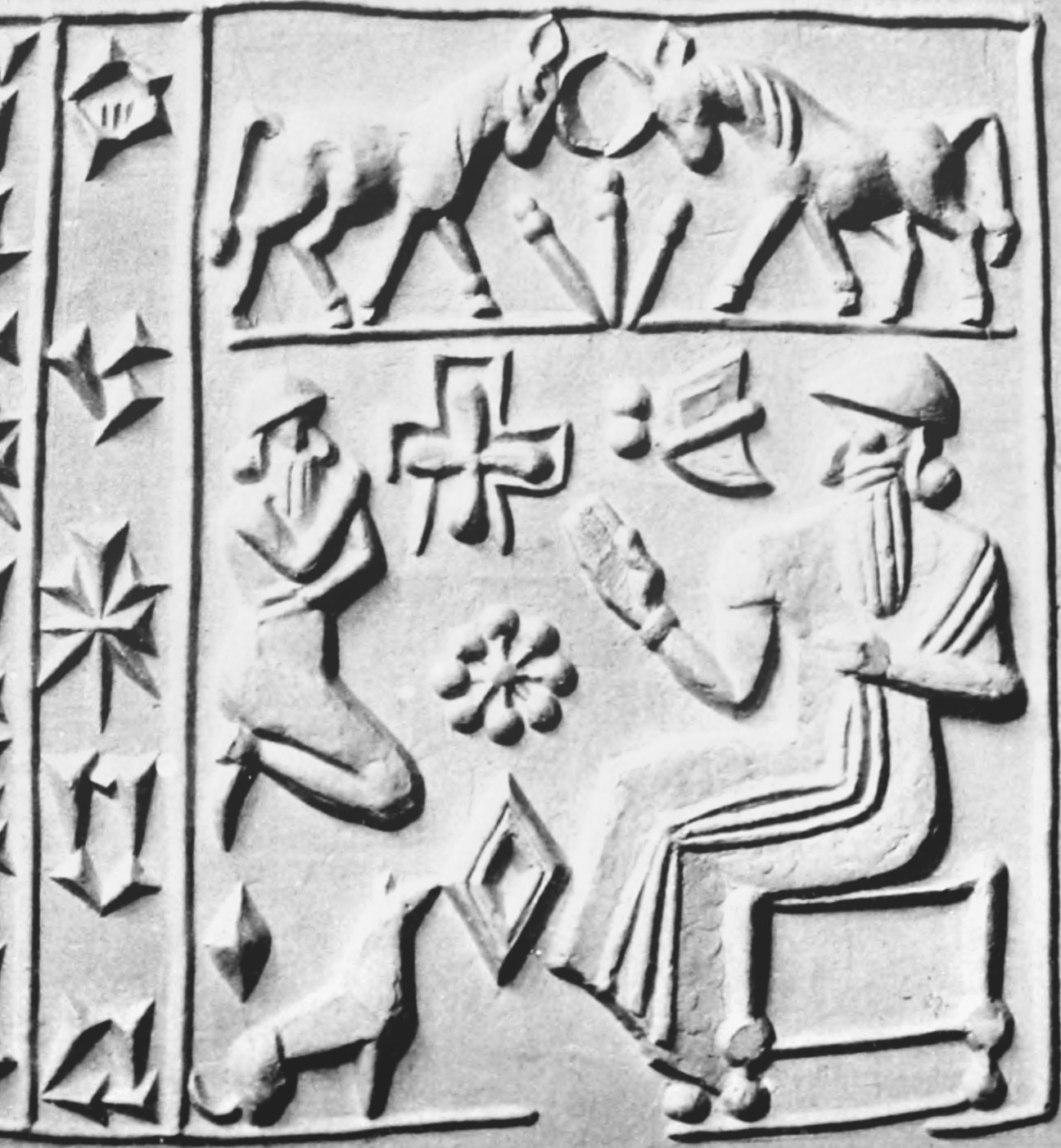
Seal dedicated to Burna-Buriash II

Burna-Buriaš II ( ; died c. 1333 BC) was a Kassite king of Babylon in the Late Bronze Age, c. 1360–1333 BC. The proverb "the time of checking the books is the shepherds' ordeal" was attributed to him in a letter to the later king Esarhaddon from his agent Mar-Issar.

== Reign ==
Burna-Buriaš II (rendered in cuneiform as Bur-na- or Bur-ra-Bu-ri-ia-aš, and meaning servant/protégé of the Lord of the lands in Kassite) is recorded as the 19th King to ascend the Kassite throne. He succeeded Kadashman-Enlil I, who was likely his father, and ruled for around 27 years.

=== International relations ===
==== Egypt ====
Depending on synchronization with the "high" or "low" chronologies of Egypt, he was a contemporary of the Egyptian Pharaohs Amenhotep III, Amenhotep IV, and Tutankhaten.

The diplomatic correspondence between Burna-Buriash II and the pharaohs is preserved in nine of the Amarna letters, designated EA (for El Amarna) 6 to 14. The relationship between Babylon and Egypt during his reign was friendly at the start, (Note: EA 6, Burna-Buriaš to Nummuwarea (Amenhotep III): "An offer of friendship," tablet VAT 149 in the Vorderasiatisches Museum, Berlin, CDLI ORACC Transliteration) and a marriage alliance was in the making. "From the time my ancestors and your ancestors made a mutual declaration of friendship, they sent beautiful greeting-gifts to each other, and refused no request for anything beautiful." (Note: EA 9, Burna-Buriaš to Nibḫurrereya (Tutankhamen?): "Ancient loyalties, new requests," tablet BM 29785 in the British Museum, London, CDLI ORACC Transliteration) Burna-Buriash II was obsessed with being received as an equal and often refers to his counterpart as "brother". They exchanged presents: horses, lapis-lazuli, and other precious stones from Burna-Buriash II and ivory, ebony and gold from Amenhotep IV. On one occasion, Burna-Buriash II sent a necklace of lapis-lazuli by way of congratulation for the birth of Amenhotep IV's first child, the princess Meritaten. (Note: EA 14, Egyptian king to Burna-Buriaš: "Inventory of Egyptian gifts," tablets VAT 1651 and VAT 2711 in the Vorderasiatisches Museum, Berlin, and 1893.1-41 in the Ashmolean Museum, Oxford, CDLI ORACC Transliteration)

But then things began to sour. On EA 10, (Note: EA 10, Burna-Buriaš to Napḫureya (Akhenaten): "Egyptian gold and carpenters," tablet BM 29786 in the British Museum, London, CDLI ORACC Transliteration) he complains that the gold sent was underweight. "You have detained my messenger for two years!" he declares in consternation. (Note: EA 7, Burna-Buriaš to Napḫureya (Akhenaten): "A lesson in geography," tablet VAT 150 in the Vorderasiatisches Museum, Berlin, CDLI ORACC Transliteration) He reproached the Egyptian for not having sent his condolences when he was ill and, when his daughter's wedding was underway, he complained that only five carriages were sent to convey her to Egypt. (Note: EA 11, Burna-Buriaš to Napḫureya (Akhenaten): "Proper escort for a betrothed princess," tablet VAT 151 + 1878 in the Vorderasiatisches Museum, Berlin, CDLI ORACC Transliteration) The bridal gifts filled 4 columns and 307 lines of cuneiform inventory on tablet EA 13. (Note: EA 13, Burna-Buriaš to Napḫureya (Akhenaten): "Inventory of a dowry," tablet VAT 1717 in the Vorderasiatisches Museum, Berlin, CDLI ORACC Transliteration)

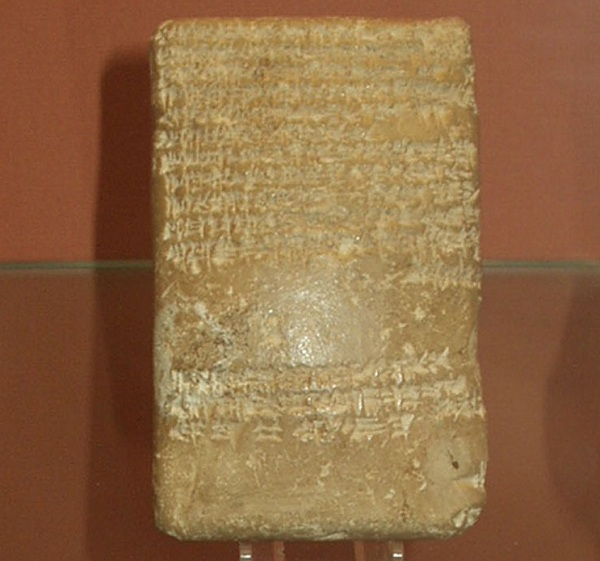
Reverse of clay cuneiform tablet, EA 9, letter from Burna-Buriash II to Nibḫurrereya (Tutankhamun?) from Room 55 of the British Museum

Not only were matters of state of concern. "What you want from my land, write and it shall be brought, and what I want from your land, I will write, that it may be brought." But even in matters of trade, things went awry and, in EA 8, (Note: EA 8, Burna-Buriaš to Napḫureya (Akhenaten): "Merchants murdered, vengeance demanded," tablet VAT 152 in the Vorderasiatisches Museum, Berlin, CDLI ORACC Transliteration) he complains that Egypt's Canaanite vassals had robbed and murdered his merchants. He demanded vengeance, naming Šum-Adda, the son of Balumme, affiliation unknown, and Satatna, the son of Saratum of Akka, as the villainous perpetrators.

In his correspondence with the Pharaohs, he did not hesitate to remind them of their obligations, quoting ancient loyalties:

In the time of Kurgalzu, my ancestor, all the Canaanites wrote here to him saying, "Come to the border of the country so we can revolt and be allied with you." My ancestor sent this (reply), saying, "Forget about being allied with me. If you become enemies of the king of Egypt, and are allied with anyone else, will I not then come and plunder you?"... For the sake of your ancestor my ancestor did not listen to them.

— Burna-Buriaš, from tablet EA 9, BM 29785, line 19 onward.

Posterity has not preserved any Egyptian response, however, Abdi-Heba, the Canaanite Mayor of Jerusalem, then a small hillside town, wrote in EA 287 (Note: EA 287, Abdi-Heba to Egyptian Pharaoh: "A very serious crime," tablet VAT 1644 in the Vorderasiatisches Museum, Berlin, CDLI ORACC transliteration) that Kassite agents had attempted to break into his home and assassinate him.

With regard to the Kassites... Though the house is well fortified, they attempted a very serious crime. They took their tools, and I had to seek shelter by a support for the roof. And so if he (pharaoh) is going to send troops into Jerusalem, let them come with a garrison for regular service.... And please make the Kassites responsible for the evil deed. I was almost killed by the Kassites in my own house. May the king make an inquiry in their regard.

— Abdi-Heba, El-Amarna tablet EA 287.

The Amarna letter EA 12 (Note: EA 12, Princess to King: "A letter from a princess," tablet VAT 1605 in the Vorderasiatisches Museum, Berlin, CDLI ORACC Transliteration) preserves the apologetic response from a mārat šarri, or princess, to her ^{m}bé-lí-ia, or lord (Nefertiti to Burna-Buriaš?). The letters present a playful, forthright and at times petulant repartee, but perhaps conceal a cunning interplay between them, to confirm their relative status, cajole the provision of desirable commodities and measure their respective threat, best exemplified by Burna-Buriaš' feigned ignorance of the distance between their countries, a four-month journey by caravan. Here he seems to test Akhenaten to shame him into sending gold or perhaps just to gauge the extent of his potential military reach.

==== Babylon and Elam ====
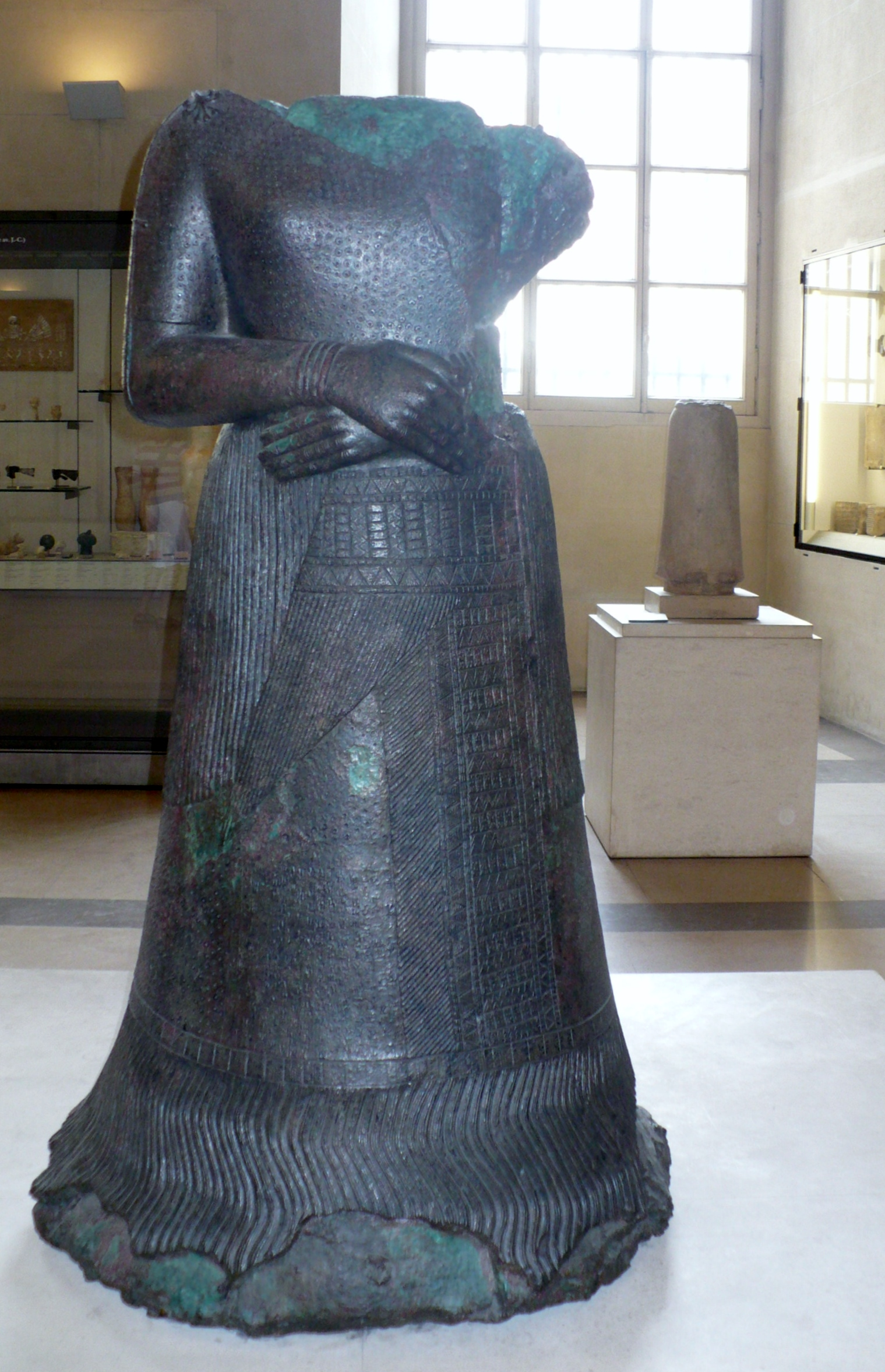
Bronze statue of Napir-asu (Note: Sb 2731, Statue of Queen Napirasu, wife of Untash-Napirisha.) in the Louvre

Diplomacy with Babylon's neighbor, Elam, was conducted through royal marriages. A Neo-Babylonian copy of a literary text which takes the form of a letter, (Note: Šutruk-Naḫḫunte (?) to Kassite court, Tablet VAT 17020 CDLI) now located in the Vorderasiatisches Museum in Berlin, is addressed to the Kassite court by an Elamite King. It details the genealogy of the Elamite royalty of this period, and from it we find that Pahir-Iššan married Kurigalzu I's sister and Humban-Numena married his daughter and their son, Untash-Napirisha was betrothed to Burna-Buriash II's daughter. This may have been Napir-asu, whose headless statue (pictured) now resides in the Louvre in Paris.

Kassite (Babylonian) influence reached to Bahrain, ancient Dilmun, where two letters found in Nippur were sent by a Kassite official, Ilī-ippašra, in Dilmun to Ililiya, a hypocoristic form of Enlil-kidinni, who was the governor, or šandabakku, of Nippur during Burna Buriaš's reign and that of his immediate successors. In the first letter, the hapless Ili-ippašra complains that the anarchic local Aḫlamû tribesmen have stolen his dates and "there is nothing I can do" while in the second letter they "certainly speak words of hostility and plunder to me".

==== Hittites ====
It is likely that Suppiluliuma I, king of the Hittites, married yet another of Burna-Buriash II's daughters, his third and final wife, who thereafter was known under the traditional title Tawananna, and this may have been the cause of his neutrality in the face of the Mitanni succession crisis. He refused asylum to the fleeing Shattiwaza, who received a more favorable response in Hittite, where Suppiluliuma I supported his reinstatement in a diminished vassal state.

According to her stepson Mursili II, she became quite a troublemaker, scheming and murderous, as in the case of Mursili's wife, foisting her strange foreign ways on the Hittite court and ultimately being exiled. His testimony is preserved in two prayers in which he condemned her.

==== Assyria ====
As Assyria became independent form Mitanni, Burna-Buriash II tried to interfere. When Assyrian messengers went to Egypt, he became angry and regarded them as his vassals.

Later, relations with Assyria improved and were cemented by royal marriage. Following the death of Burna-Buriash II, Ashur-Uballit I intervened in the succession of Babylon.

Kara-Hardas: Later in his reign the emissaries of Assyrian king Ashur-uballit I were received at the Egyptian court by Tutankhaten, who had by then ascended the throne. This caused a great deal of dismay from Burna-Buriash II who claimed that Assyria was his vassal, "Why have they been received in your land? If I am dear to you, do not let them conclude any business. May they return here with empty hands!" on EA 9. With the destruction of Mitanni by the Hittites, Assyria emerged as a great power during his reign, threatening the northern border of the Kassite kingdom.

Perhaps to cement relations, Muballitat-Sherua, daughter of Ashur-uballit I, had been married to either Burna-Buriash II or possibly his son, Kara-hardash; the historical sources do not agree. The scenario proposed by Brinkman has come to be considered the orthodox interpretation of these events. A poorly preserved letter in the Pergamon Museum possibly mentions him and a princess or mārat šarri. (Note: Tablet VAT 11187 published as KAV 097 CDLI, line 1: [ka-ra-] ḫar-da-aš, and 3: a-ma DUMU MUNUS MAN di-mu.) Kara-hardash was murdered, shortly after succeeding his father to the throne, during a rebellion by the Kassite army around 1333 BC.

Nazi-Bugas: According to an Assyrian chronicle this incited Aššur-uballiṭ to invade, depose the usurper installed by the army, one Nazi-Bugaš or Šuzigaš, described as "a Kassite, son of a nobody".

Kurigalzu II: Ashur-Uballit I then installed Kurigalzu II, "the younger", variously rendered as son of Burnaburiaš (Note: The Synchronistic Chronicle (ABC 21), K4401a, Column 1, line A16.) and son of Kadašman-Ḫarbe, likely a scribal error for Kara-hardash. (Note: Chronicle P (ABC 22), tablet BM 92701, line 14) Note, however, that there are more than a dozen royal inscriptions of Kurigalzu II identifying Burna-Buriaš as his father.

=== Domestic affairs ===
Building activity increased markedly in the latter half of the fourteenth century with Burna-Buriaš and his successors undertaking restoration work of sacred structures. Inscriptions from three door sockets and bricks, some of which are still in situ, bear witness to his restoration of the Ebabbar of the sun god Shamash in Larsa. A tablet provides an exhortation to Enlil and a brick refers to work on the great socle of the Ekiur of Ninlil in Nippur. A 13 line bilingual inscription can now probably be assigned to him. (Note: Bilingual inscription Sm. 699, K. 4807 + Sm. 977 + 79-7-8,80 + 79-7-8,314.) Neo-Babylonian temple inventory from Ur mentions him along with successors as a benefactor. (Note: Temple inventory UET 4 143 (now = IM 57150).) A cylinder inscription of Nabonidus (Note: Cylinder BM 104738, column I, lines 49 to 52.) recalls Burna-Buriash II’s earlier work on the temenos at Sippar:

The foundation record of Ebarra which Burna-buriaš, a king of former times, my predecessor, had made, he saw and upon the foundation record of Burna-buriaš, not a finger-breadth too high, not a finger-breadth beyond, the foundation of that Ebarra he laid.

— Inscription of Nabonidus, cylinder BM 104738.

There are around 87 economic texts, most of which were found at successive excavations in Nippur, providing a date formula based on regnal years, which progress up to year 27. Many of them are personnel rosters dealing with servile laborers, who were evidently working under duress as the terms ZÁḤ, "escapee", and ka-mu, "fettered", are used to classify some of them. Apparently thousands of men were employed in construction and agriculture and women in the textile industry. An oppressive regime developed to constrain their movements and prevent their escape. Other texts include two extispicy reports provide divinations based on examination of animal entrails. Nippur seems to have enjoyed the status of a secondary capital. The presence of the royal retinue replete with scribes would have provided the means for the creation of business records for the local population.
