= Ashur-uballit I =

Assyrian king

- King of Assyria; King of the Universe
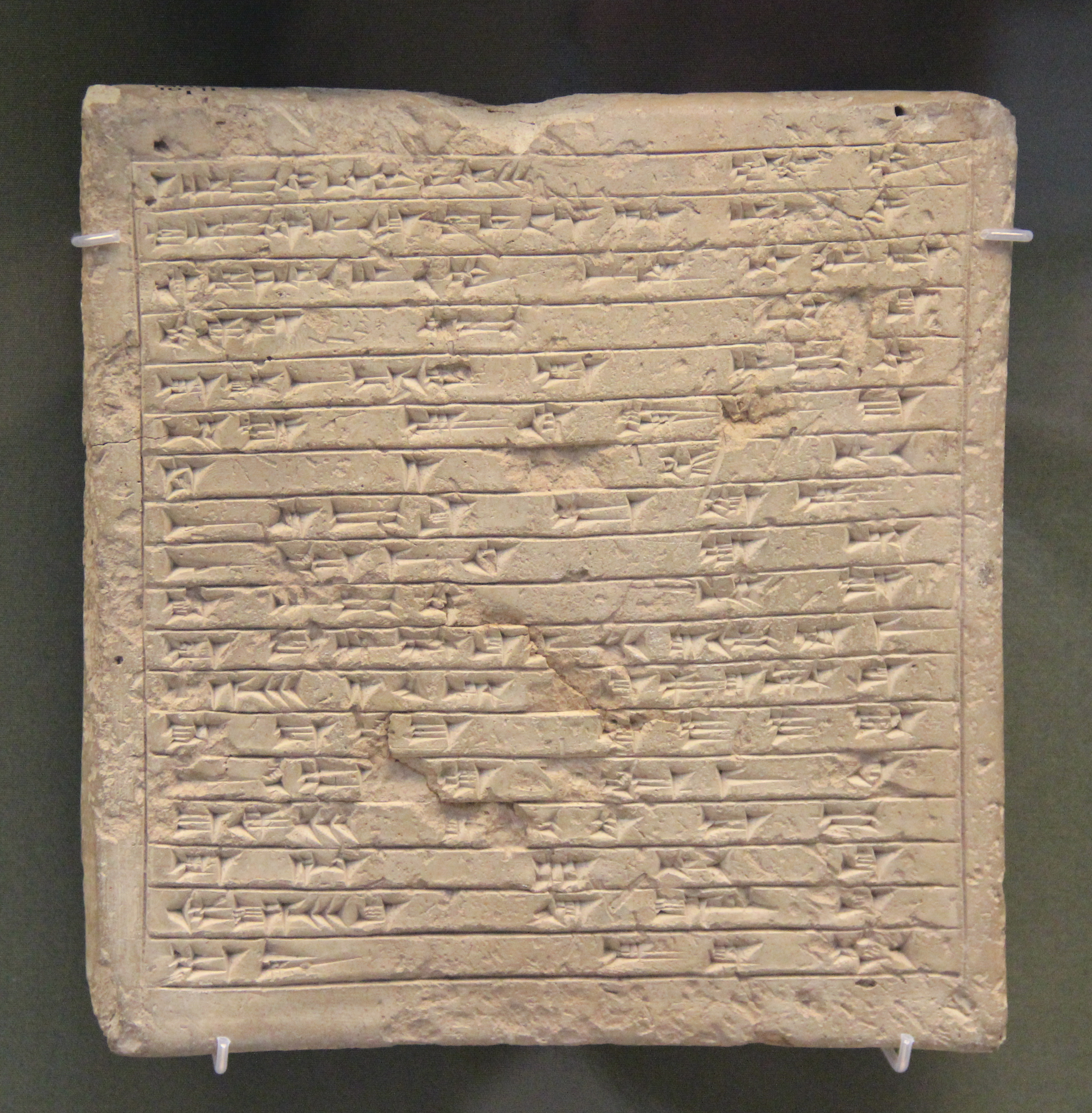
- Tablet from the reign of Ashur-uballit I

King of the Middle Assyrian Empire
- Reign: 1363–1328 BC; 1353-1318 BC
- Predecessor: Eriba-Adad I
- Successor: Enlil-nirari
- Issue: Enlil-nirari; Muballitat-Sherua
- Father: Eriba-Adad I

Ashur-uballit I (Aššur-uballiṭ I), who reigned between c. 1363 and c. 1328 BC, was king of Assyria and the first king of the Middle Assyrian Empire. After his father Eriba-Adad I (1390-1364 BC) had broken half a century of intermittent Hurrian-Mitanni influence over Assyria, Ashur-uballit I's defeat of the Mitanni king Shuttarna III marks Assyria's full ascendancy over the Hurri-Mitanni civilizations, much of which it annexed, and the beginning of its emergence as a powerful empire. Later on, due to disorder in Babylonia following the death of the Kassite king Burnaburiash II, Ashur-uballit invaded and established Kurigalzu II on the Babylonian throne, in the first of what would become a series of Assyrian interventions in Babylonian affairs.

== Family and personal life ==
Burnaburiash married Muballitat-Sherua of Assyria, the daughter of Ashur-uballit I. Together, they had at least one son, Prince Kara-hardash. They may also have been the parents of Kurigalzu II, or his grandparents.

== Amarna letters ==
Two of the Amarna letters were sent by Ashur-uballit I.

== Babylonian wars ==
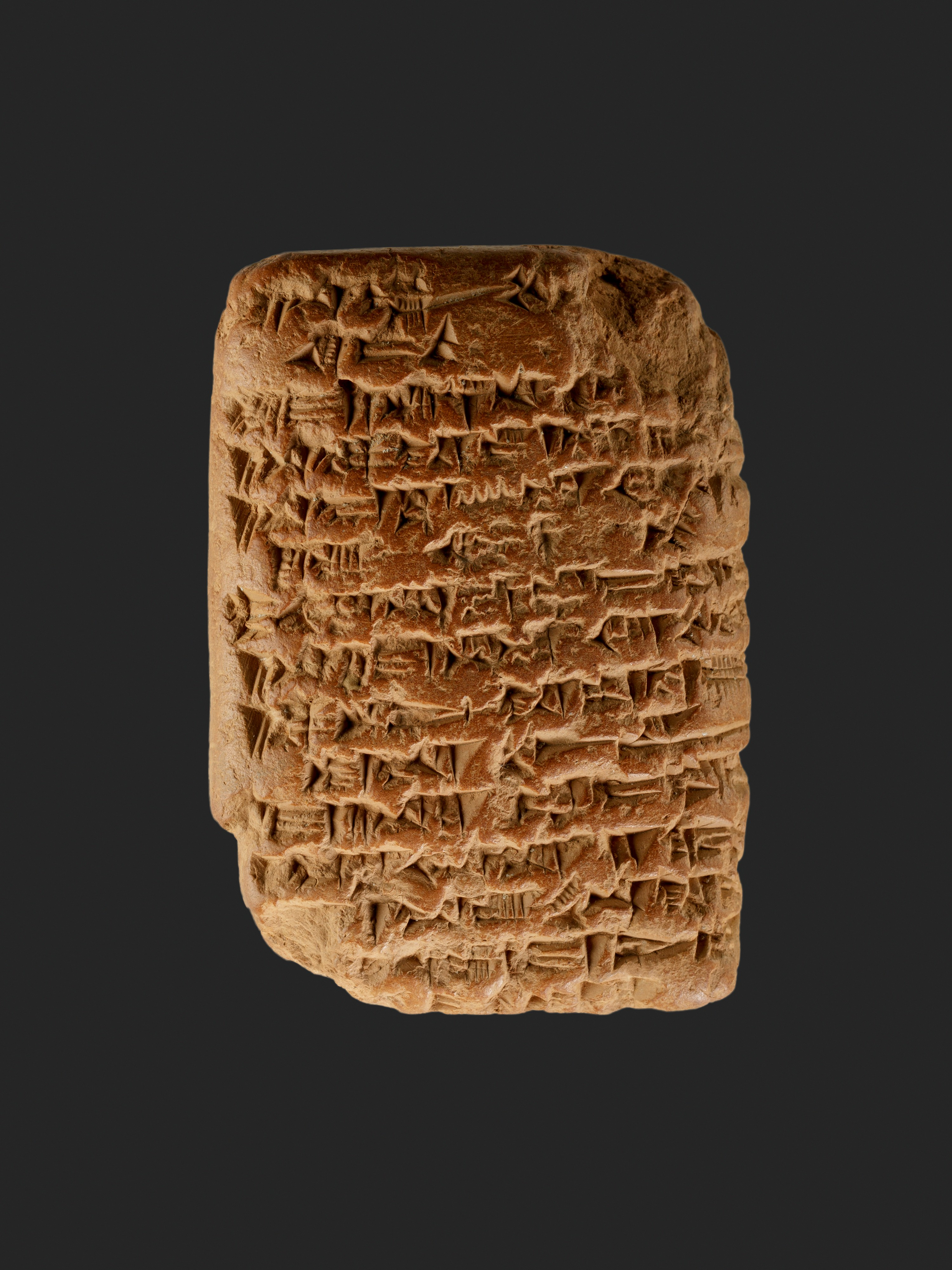
Amarna letter EA 15, from Ashur-uballit I to the Pharaoh of Egypt.

With Assyrian power firmly established in Mesopotamia, northeast Levant and southeast Anatolia, Ashur-uballit started to make contacts with other great nations. His messages to the Egyptians angered his Babylonian neighbour Burnaburiash II, who himself wrote to the Pharaoh: “with regard to my Assyrian vassals, it was not I who sent them to you. Why did they go to your country without proper authority? If you are loyal to me, they will not negotiate any business. Send them to me empty-handed!”

== Legacy ==
Prince Kara-hardash succeeded his father. A revolt soon broke out that showed the unpopularity of the Assyrians. Asshur-uballit would not allow his grandson to be cast aside, and duly invaded Babylon. Because Kara-Hardash was killed in the rebellion, the Assyrians placed on the Babylonian throne Kurigalzu II. But this new puppet king did not remain loyal to his master, and soon invaded Assyria. Ashur-uballit stopped the Babylonian army at Sugagu, not far south from the capital Assur.

Ashur-uballit I then counterattacked, and invaded Babylonia, appropriating hitherto Babylonian territory in central Mesopotamia, and forcing a treaty in Assyria's favour upon Kurigalzu.

== See also ==
- Amarna letter EA 15
- Amarna letter EA 16

Preceded by Eriba-Adad I	King of Assyria; 1363–1328 BC	Succeeded by Enlil-nirari
