= Kara-hardash =

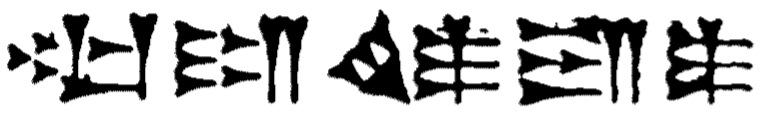
- The name of Kara-hardash in Akkadian (Babylonian) cuneiform

King of Babylon
- Reign: c. 1333 BC
- Predecessor: Burna-Buriash II
- Died: c. 1333 BC
- Father: Burna-Buriash II

Kara-hardash (Kara-ḫardaš; died c. 1333 BC), also rendered Kadashman-Harbe and possibly Karaindash, was a king of Babylon. He was king of Babylon around 1333 BC. He may have been the son of king Burna-Buriash II. His rule was short, as shortly after his appointment as king, he was killed in an anti-Assyrian revolt. His death was avenged by his grandfather, the Assyrian ruler Ashur-uballit I. After suppressing the revolt and removing the usurper appointed by the Kassites, they appointed Kurigalzu II as king. The latter's connection to the Assyrians is unclear. It is not excluded that he was Kara-hardash's son.

== Biography ==
He was the son of Burna-Buriash II. In the Synchronistic History, his name is spelled both Karahardash and Karaindash, perhaps due to different phonetic readings. Alternatively, these are two different persons, with Karahardash (i.e. Kadashman-Harbe) being the son of Karaindash, husband of Muballitat-Sherua. Another ancient source, the Chronicle P, gives a biography of the life of Kara-hardash that is almost identical to the Synchronistic History's, but records that his name was Kadashman-Harbe, and that his father was Karaindash. Kadašman-Ḫarbe is likely a scribal error for Kara-hardash. Neither of the ancient sources explicitly names who the husband of Muballitat-Sherua was.

Upon the death of his father, Kara-hardash became king of Babylon. During his short reign, he went to war against the Suteans, and was also able to carry off a number of public works, including the digging of wells and building of a fortress.

=== Rebellion and death ===
His reign was short-lived, however. An anti-Assyrian rebellion broke out, in which he was murdered. The army then appointed Nazi-Bugaš, or Šuzigaš, a pure Kassite, as king. His Assyrian grandfather, Ashur-uballit I, suppressed the rebellion, deposed the usurper, and appointed a certain Kurigalzu II as king. It is unclear how this Kurigalzu was connected to the Assyrians, but he might have been Kara-Hardash's (i.e. Kadashman-Harbe's) son.
