= Hurrians =

Historical ethnic group of Southwest Asia

𒄷𒌨𒊑
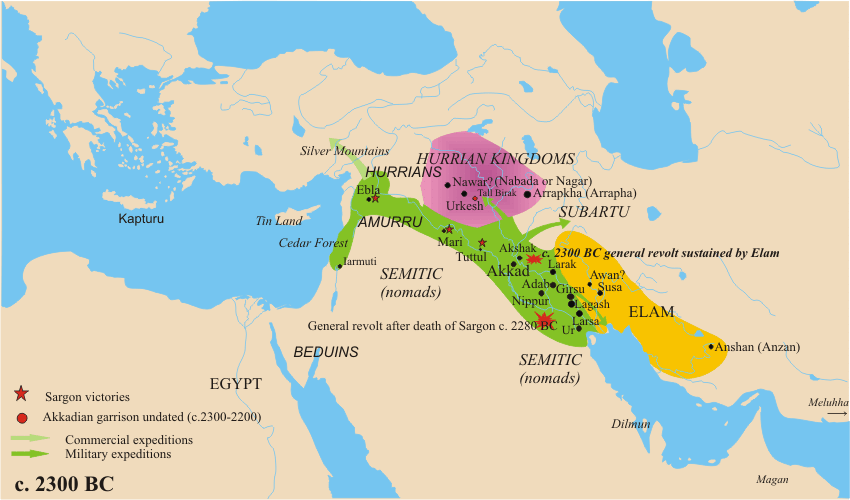
- The approximate area of Hurrian settlement in the Middle Bronze Age is shown in purple

Regions with significant populations
- Near East

Languages
- Hurrian

Religion
- Hurrian religion

Related ethnic groups
- Urarteans, Subarians, Mannaeans

The Hurrians (/ˈhʊəriənz/) were a people who inhabited the Ancient Near East during the Bronze Age. They spoke the Hurrian language, and lived throughout northern Syria, upper Mesopotamia and southeastern Anatolia.

The Hurrians were first documented in the city of Urkesh, where they built their first kingdom. The largest and most influential Hurrian kingdom was Mitanni. The population of the Hittite Empire in Anatolia included a large population of Hurrians, and there is significant Hurrian influence in Hittite mythology. By the Early Iron Age, the Hurrians had been assimilated with other peoples. The state of Urartu later covered some of the same area. A related people to the Hurrians are the Urarteans.

== History ==
=== Origins ===
The Hurrians are believed by some historians to have originated in the Armenian highlands or the Caucasus, from where they later migrated southward into the Fertile Crescent.

Several scholars have proposed that the populations of the Kura-Araxes culture were ancestral to the Hurrians. Antonio Sagona, on the other hand, argues that it is difficult to demonstrate a connection between the Kura-Araxes culture and the lowland Hurrian culture, as their material cultures are largely different. However, archaeological excavations at Tell Mozan (Urkesh), conducted by Giorgio Buccellati and Marilyn Kelly-Buccellati, reveal that local Hurrian artifacts bear affinities with the Kura-Araxes culture, suggesting a link between the two.

Other scholars have suggested that the Hurrians were aborigines of Mesopotamia, and connected the prehistoric Tell Halaf (c. 6100-5100 BC) or Samarra cultures (c. 5500-4800 BC) with the proto-Hurrian population. H. W. F. Saggs likewise suggested that the Hurrians could have been native to northern Mesopotamia. Igor M. Diakonoff, on the contrary, claimed it is more likely that the Hurrians were newcomers who migrated into Syria and Mesopotamia during the third millennium BC.

Some hypothesized that the Khirbet Kerak ware in the Levant, also known as the Red Black Burnished ware, and its foundation represents a wave of proto-Hurrians, but the absence of Hurrian names in the Ebla archives contradicts this hypothesis. In any case, the Khirbet Kerak culture appears to have been a Levantine version of the Early Transcaucasian culture.

=== Early Bronze Age ===
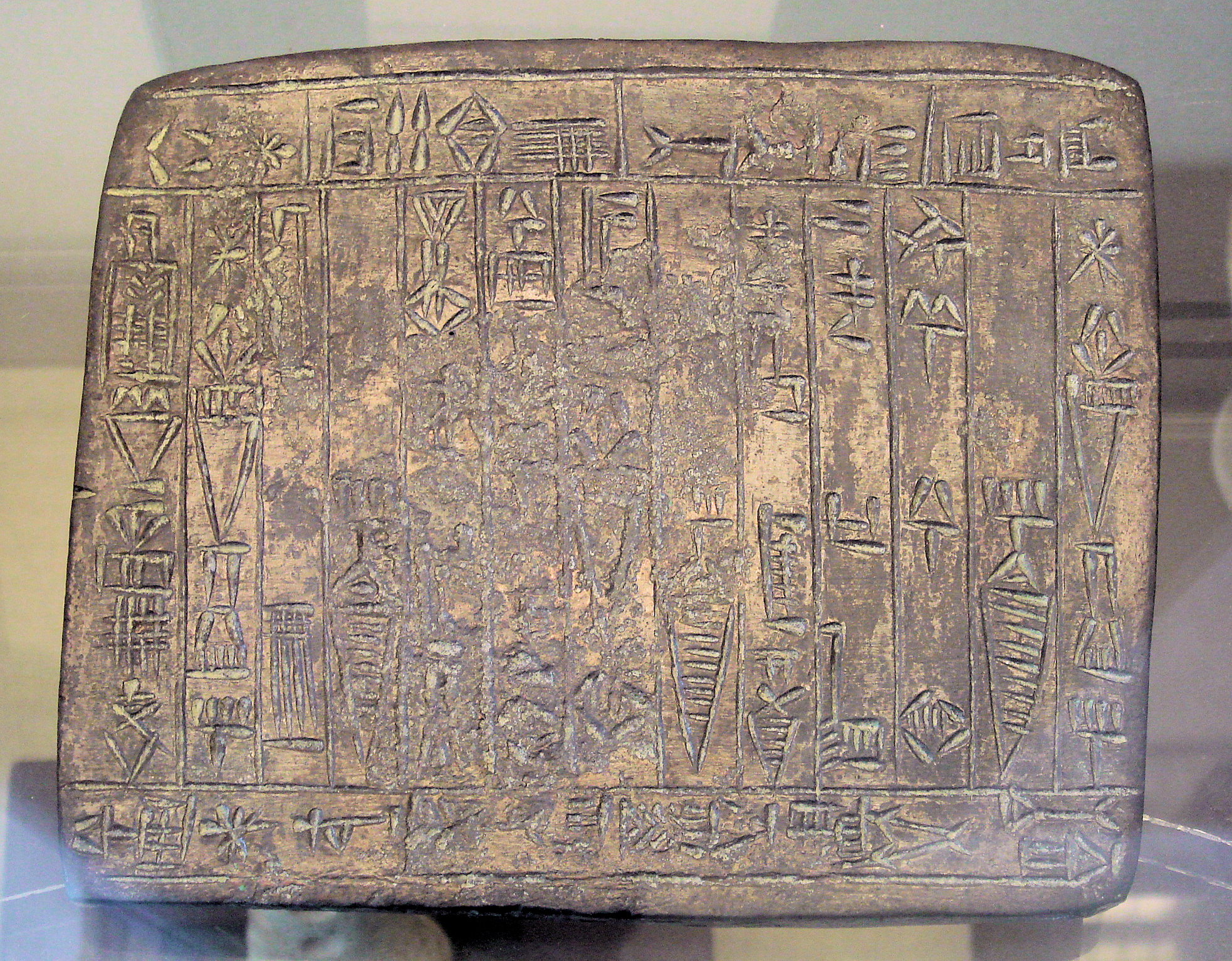
Foundation tablet. Dedication to God Nergal by Hurrian king Atalshen, king of Urkish and Nawar, Habur basin, circa 2000 BC. Louvre Museum AO 5678. "Of Nergal the lord of Hawalum, Atal-shen, the caring shepherd, the king of Urkesh and Nawar, the son of Sadar-mat the king, is the builder of the temple of Nergal, the one who overcomes opposition. Let Shamash and Ishtar destroy the seeds of whoever removes this tablet. Shaum-shen is the craftsman."

The Khabur River valley, located in modern-day Syria and Turkey, became the heart of the Hurrian lands for a millennium. The first known Hurrian kingdom emerged around the city of Urkesh (modern Tell Mozan) during the third millennium BC. There is evidence that they were initially allied with the Akkadian Empire of Mesopotamia, indicating they had a firm hold on the area by the reign of Naram-Sin of Akkad (c. 2254–2218 BC). A king of Urkesh with the Hurrian name Tupkish had a queen with the name Uqnitum, Akkadian for "girl of lapis lazuli". By the Third Dynasty of Ur, Hurrian presence extended from the Zagros mountains to Tur Abdin, and from Subartu towards Ebla. This extensive presence had a major impact on both the political and cultural life in upper Mesopotamia.

=== Middle Bronze Age ===
Hurrian names occur sporadically in northwestern Mesopotamia and the area of Kirkuk in modern Iraq by the Middle Bronze Age. Their presence was attested at Nuzi, Urkesh and other sites. They eventually occupied a broad arc of fertile farmland stretching from the Khabur River valley in the west to the foothills of the Zagros Mountains in the east. By this point, during the Old Babylonian period in the early second millennium BC, the Amorite kingdom of Mari to the south had subdued Urkesh and made it a vassal state. Urkesh later became a Mitanni religious center.

The Hurrians also migrated further west in this period. By 1725 BC, they are found also in parts of northern Syria, such as Alalakh. The mixed Amorite–Hurrian kingdom of Yamhad is recorded as struggling for this area with the early Hittite king Hattusilis I around 1600 BC. Hurrians also settled in the coastal region of Adaniya in the country of Kizzuwatna, southern Anatolia. Yamhad eventually weakened vis-a-vis the powerful Hittites, but this also opened Anatolia for Hurrian cultural influences. The Hittites were influenced by both the Hurrian cultures over the course of several centuries.

The city of Shibaniba (Tell Billa) may have also played an important role at that time. Possible Hurrian occupation was identified at Tell Billa during the middle of the second millennium BC. In 2022, Tell Billa was proposed as the possible site of the city of Šimānum (possibly known as Asimānum during the Akkadian Empire). Šimānum was important during the Ur III period (ca 2100 BC).

=== Late Bronze Age ===
The Hurrians who entered northern Syria at the end of the 17th century BC were responsible for bringing important political, strategic and cultural changes to the population in the region, eventually establishing feudal states led by a chariot-warrior aristocracy. The Mitanni Empire was a strong regional power established by the Hurrians, and was limited by the Hittites to the north, Egyptians to the southwest, Kassites to the southeast and, later, by the Assyrians to the east. At its maximum extent, Mitanni ranged as far as west as Kizzuwatna by the Taurus mountains, Tunip in the south, Arraphe in the east, and north to Lake Van. Their sphere of influence is shown in the spread of Hurrian place names and personal names. Eventually, after an internal succession crisis, Mitanni fell to the Hittites, later to fall under the control of the Assyrians. The Hurrians of Syria would continue to migrate even further, reaching as far south as Palestine.

The Hurrian entity of Mitanni, which first rose to power before 1550 BC, was first mentioned in the records of Egyptian pharaohs Thutmose I (1506–1493 BC) and Thutmose III (1479–1425 BC), the later most notably associated with the Battle of Megiddo in that pharaoh's 22nd regnal year. Most of the time, Egyptians referred to the kingdom as Naharin. Later, Mitanni and Hanigalbat (the Assyrian name for Mitanni) are mentioned in the Amarna Letters during the time of Pharaoh Akhenaten (1353–1336 BC). Domestically, Mitanni records have been found at a number of places in the region, including several Hittite sites as well as Tell Bazi, Alalakh, Nuzi, Mardaman, Kemune, and Müslümantepe among others.

Another major center of Hurrian influence was the kingdom of Arrapḫa. Excavations at Yorgan Tepe, ancient Nuzi, proved this to be one of the most important sites for our knowledge about the Hurrians. Hurrian kings such as Ithi-Teshup and Ithiya ruled over Arrapḫa, yet by the mid-fifteenth century BC they had become vassals of the Great King of Mitanni.

=== Shubria/Shupria ===
After the destruction of Mitanni by the Hittites around 1350-1325 BC, the term Shubaru (Subartu) was used in Assyrian sources to refer to the remnants of the Mitanni in the upper Tigris valley. The Shubaru people revolted against the Assyrians multiple times in the last centuries of the second millennium BC. The term is related to Shupria, the name of a kingdom located north of the upper Tigris River valley. Shupria was located between Urartu and Assyria and existed as an independent kingdom until its conquest by Assyria in 673–672 BC. The Shuprians worshipped the Hurrian deity Teshub, and several Shuprian names have Hurrian origins. Hurrians formed part of the Shuprian population and may have been the predominant group. Some scholars have suggested that Shupria was the last remnant of Hurrian civilization, or even constituted the original homeland of the Hurrians. Karen Radner writes that Shupria "can certainly be described as [a] (linguistically and culturally) Hurrian" state. According to Radner, a letter from the king of Shupria to an Assyrian magnate from the time of Sargon II was composed in the Hurrian language.

== Culture and society ==
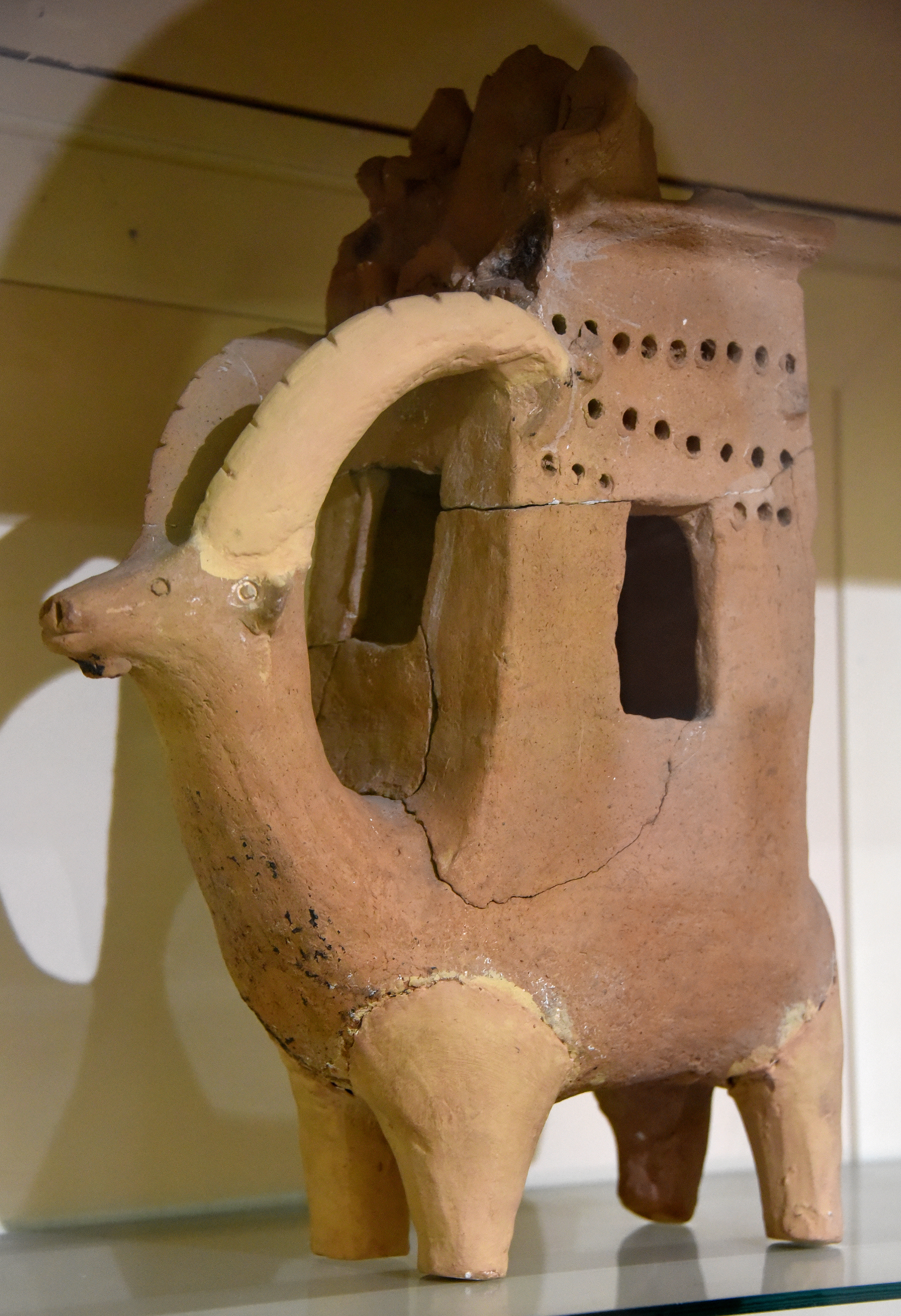
Incense burner. Hurrian period, 1300–1000 BC. From Tell Basmosian (also Tell Bazmusian), modern-day Lake Dukan, Iraq. Currently displayed in Erbil Civilization Museum.

Knowledge of Hurrian culture relies on archaeological excavations at sites such as Nuzi and Alalakh as well as on cuneiform tablets, primarily from Hattusa (Boghazköy), the capital of the Hittites, whose civilization was greatly influenced by the Hurrians. Tablets from Nuzi, Alalakh, and other cities with Hurrian populations (as shown by personal names) reveal Hurrian cultural features even though they were written in Akkadian. Hurrian cylinder seals were carefully carved and often portrayed mythological motifs. They are a key to the understanding of Hurrian culture and history.

The 2nd millennium Hurrians were masterful ceramists. Their pottery is commonly found in Mesopotamia and in the lands west of the Euphrates; it was highly valued in distant Egypt, by the time of the New Kingdom. Archaeologists use the terms Khabur ware and Nuzi ware for two types of wheel-made pottery used by the Hurrians. Khabur ware is characterized by reddish painted lines with a geometric triangular pattern and dots, while Nuzi ware has very distinctive forms, and are painted in brown or black. They were also skilled at glass working.

Their most enduring cultural contribution was to bring the horse into wider use. The Hurrians were likely the first in Mesopotamia to recognize the full potential of the horse, likewise the first in the Near East, alongside the Hittites, to have introduced the two-wheeled horse-drawn chariot for military purposes. The ancient Egyptians regarded the Hurrians as expert horsemen, later employing their talents during the New Kingdom of Egypt. Annelies Kammenhuber argued that the supposed incursion of Aryan charioteers into the Near East during the Bronze Age was a myth, and that Hurrians were the ones to bring the art of chariotry and horse breeding to its highest level. While her thesis have encountered occasional criticism, her conclusions remain quite influential.

The Hurrians had a reputation in metallurgy. It is proposed that the Sumerian term for "coppersmith" tabira/tibira was borrowed from Hurrian, which would imply an early presence of the Hurrians way before their first historical mention in Akkadian sources. Copper was traded south to Mesopotamia from the highlands of Anatolia. The Khabur Valley had a central position in the metal trade, and copper, silver and even tin were accessible from the Hurrian-dominated countries Kizzuwatna and Ishuwa situated in the Anatolian highland. Gold was in short supply, and the Amarna letters inform us that it was acquired from Egypt. Not many examples of Hurrian metal work have survived, except from the later Urartu. Some small fine bronze lion foundation pegs were discovered at Urkesh.

Among the Hurrian texts from Ugarit are the oldest known instances of written music, dating from c. 1400 BC. Among these fragments are found the names of four Hurrian composers, Tapšiẖuni, Puẖiya(na), Urẖiya, and Ammiya.

== Tribes and subgroups ==
The Hurrians were divided into several clans and subgroups, who established a number of city-states, kingdoms and empires throughout the ancient Near East. Amjad Jaimoukha claimed the Gutians, Hattians, Kassites, Mitannis, Mushki and Urartians to be Hurrian clans.

=== Subarians ===
The precise origin and identity of the Subarians who inhabited the land of Subartu has been a matter of scholarly debate. Assyriologists such as Adolf Leo Oppenheim (1904-1974) and Arthur Ungnad (1879-1947) argued that the Subarians and Hurrians were the same people, whereas Ephraim Speiser (1902-1965) and Ignace Gelb (1907-1985) maintained that they were distinct groups. Nonetheless, it remains unclear whether the term "Subarian" was simply another name for Hurrians from the very beginning, or if it designated the pre-Hurrian population.

=== Turukkaeans ===
The Turukkaeans were likely a Bronze and Iron Age tribe of Hurrians who inhabited the region of Turrukum, located south of Lake Urmia. They may have spoken the Hurrian language, and were often commanded by Hurrian military leaders. The region of Turrukum consisted of several kingdoms with a population that was predominantly Hurrian, but also significantly Semitic.

=== Urartians/Urartu ===
The Urartians were an Iron Age people who established the kingdom of Urartu and spoke the Urartian language. Some scholars consider the Urartians to have been an offshoot of the Hurrians, while others regard them as distinct from the Hurrians but closely related ethnically and linguistically, sharing a common ancestor. Gernot Wilhelm claims that the only real link between the Hurrians and Urartians is linguistic; the split of the two languages may have occurred already in the third millennium BC. Albrecht Goetze considered Urartu to be a re-consolidation of earlier Hurrian states, a view that was widely held at the time, while also denying the opposing view that Urartu was established by a newly arrived people. However, a closer examination shows that this opinion does not accord with the available data.

=== Mannaeans ===
The Mannaeans who established the kingdom of Mannaea in northwestern Iran, have also been considered to be a group of Hurrians. The basic population of Mannaea appears to have been Hurrian, including the Mannaean chiefs. Rainer Michael Boehmer regarded the Mannaeans as a Hurrian group with a slight Kassite admixture. According to Karen Radner, they presently elude any cultural, ethnic, or linguistic classification. The names of Mannaean kings seems to be in Old Iranian, while others are probably of Hurrian or Urartian origin. Robert H. Dyson, Jr. claimed that they were linguistically related to the Hurrians and Urartians.

=== Hyksos ===
Middle Europeans and ancient historians initially believed the Hyksos, a west-Semitic group of rulers, to be a people of Hurrian and Aryan components, but following the revulsion of both antisemitism and the concept of an Aryan Master race after World War II, scholars now tend to dismiss the possibility of Hurrian or Indo-European elements among the Hyksos.

== Religion ==
The Hurrian culture made a great impact on the religion of the Hittites. From the Hurrian cult centre at Kummanni in Kizzuwatna, Hurrian religion spread to the Hittite people. Syncretism merged the Old Hittite and Hurrian religions. Hurrian religion spread to Syria, where Baal became the counterpart of Teshub. The Hurrian religion, in different forms, influenced the entire ancient Near East, except ancient Egypt and southern Mesopotamia.

While the Hurrian and Urartian languages are related, there is little similarity between corresponding systems of belief.

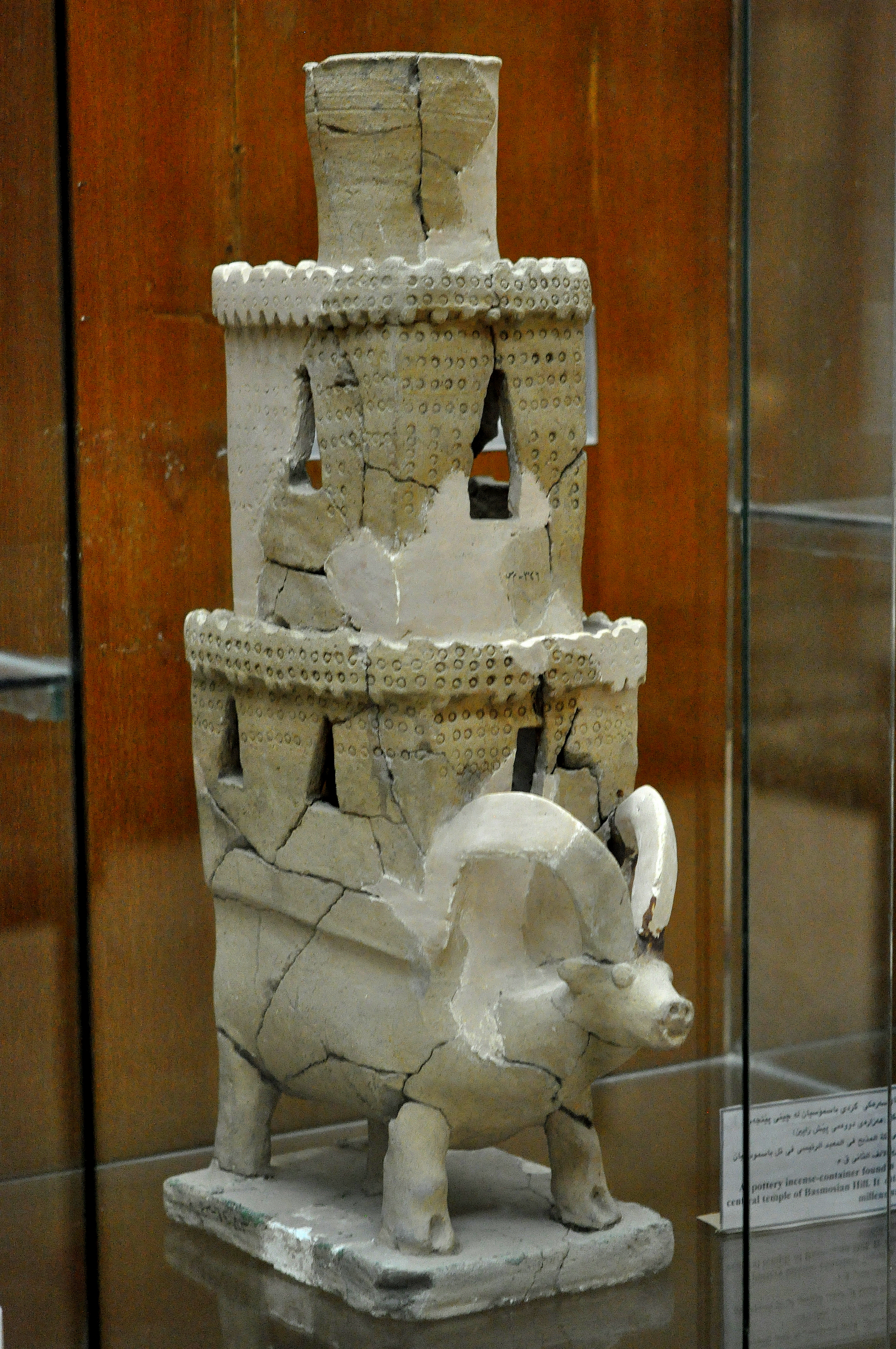
Hurrian incense container

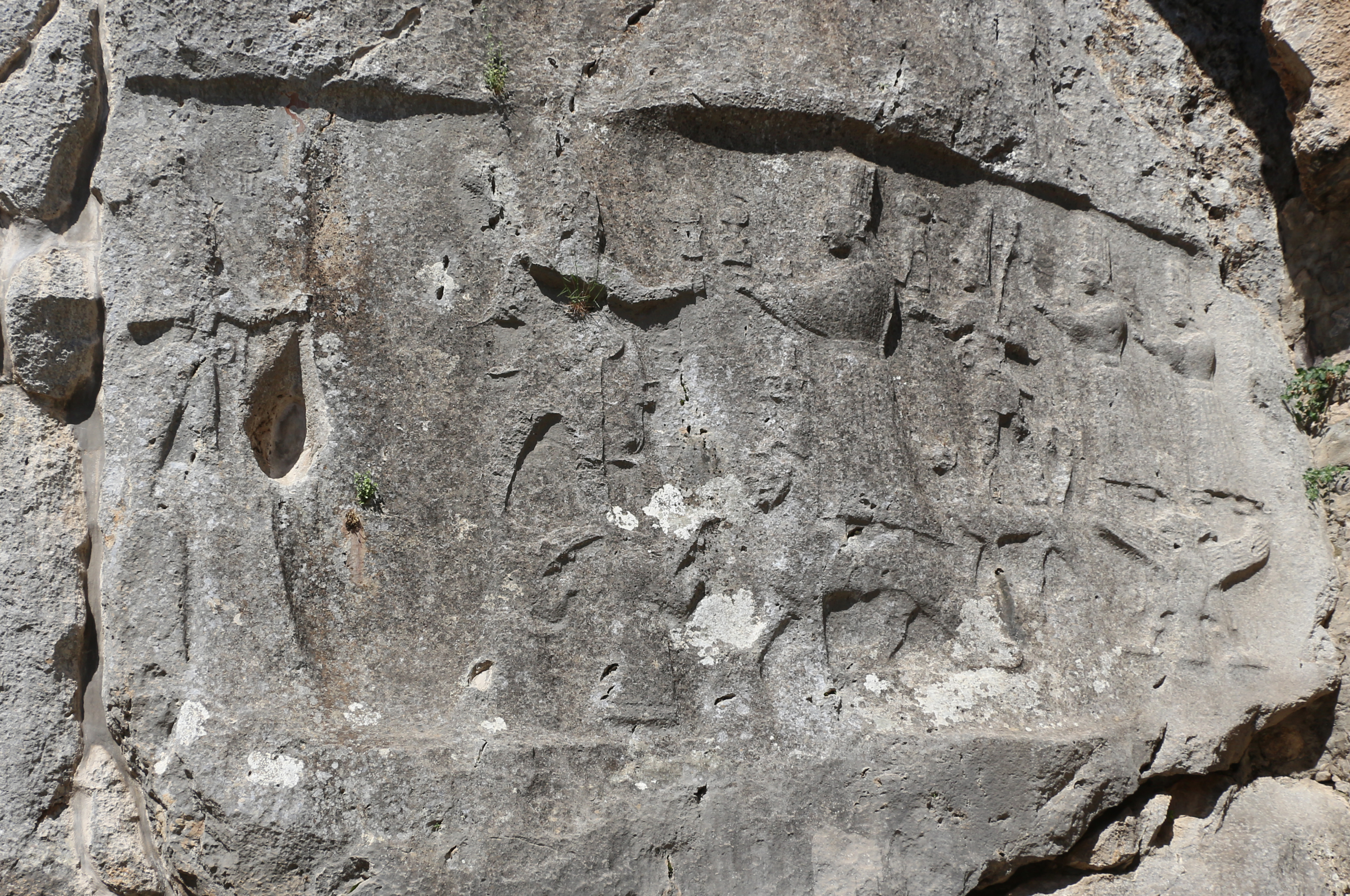
The Hittite gods Teshub and Hebat, chamber A, Yazilikaya, Hittite rock sanctuary, Turkey

The main gods in the Hurrian pantheon were:

- Teshub, Teshup, the mighty weather god.
- Hebat, Hepa, his wife, the mother goddess, later equated with the main sun goddess of the Hittites
- Sarruma, Šarruma, their son, a mountain god of Syrian origin.
- Kumarbi, grain god, the father of Teshub and a "father of gods" similar to Enlil; his home as described in mythology is the city of Urkesh.
- Shaushka, Šauska, the Hurrian counterpart of Ishtar, and a goddess of love, war and healing.
- Shimegi, Šimegi, the sun god.
- Kushuh, Kušuh, the moon god and a guardian of oaths. Symbols of the sun and the crescent moon appear joined together in the Hurrian iconography.
- Nergal, a Sumerian deity of the netherworld, who had a prominent temple in Urkesh in the earliest period of recorded Hurrian history. Possibly a stand-in for a god whose Hurrian name is presently unknown.
- Ea, Hayya, the god of wisdom, who was also Sumerian in origin.
- Allani, goddess of the netherworld.
- Ishara, a goddess of Syrian origin.
- Aštabi, a war god.
- Nupatik, a prominent god of uncertain function.
- Hutena and Hutellura, fate and birth goddesses.

Hurrian cylinder seals often depict mythological creatures such as winged humans or animals, dragons and other monsters. The interpretation of these depictions of gods and demons remains uncertain. They may have been both protective and evil spirits. Some are reminiscent of the Assyrian shedu.

The Hurrian gods do not appear to have had particular home temples, like in the Mesopotamian or Ancient Egyptian religion. Some important cult centres were Kummanni in Kizzuwatna and Hittite Yazilikaya. Harran was at least later a religious centre for the moon god, and Shauskha had an important temple in Nineve, when the city was under Hurrian rule. A temple of Nergal was built in Urkesh in the late third millennium BC. The town of Kahat was a religious centre in the kingdom of Mitanni.

The Hurrian myth "The Songs of Ullikummi", preserved among the Hittites, is a parallel to Hesiod's Theogony; the castration of Uranus by Cronus may be derived from the castration of Anu by Kumarbi, while Zeus's overthrow of Cronus and Cronus's regurgitation of the swallowed gods is like the Hurrian myth of Teshub and Kumarbi. It has been argued that the worship of Attis drew on Hurrian myth.

== Language ==
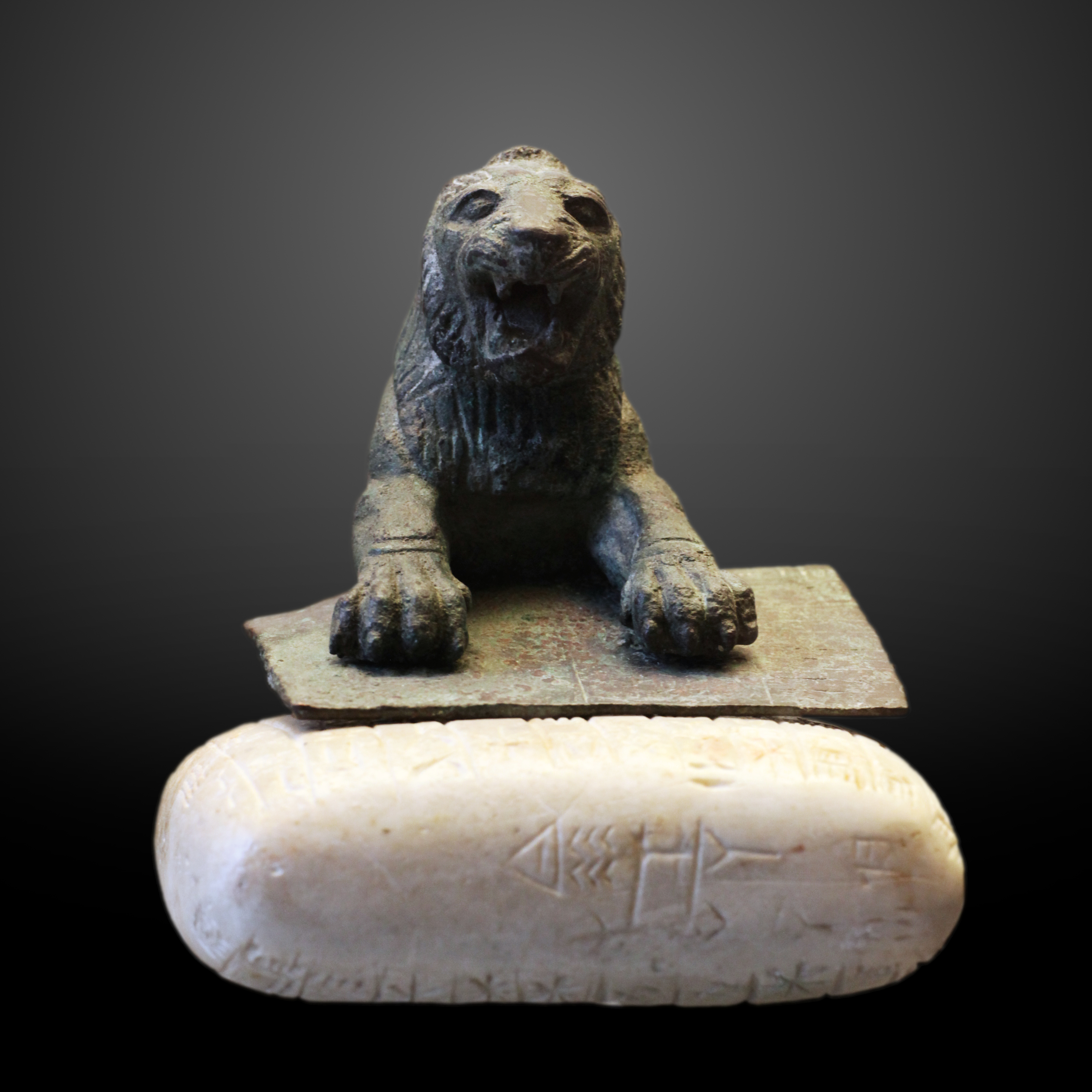
The Louvre lion and accompanying stone tablet bearing the earliest known text in Hurrian

The non-Semitic and non-Indo-European agglutinative and highly ergative Hurrian language is related to the Urartian language, the language of the ancient kingdom of Urartu. Together they form the Hurro-Urartian language family. The external connections of the Hurro-Urartian languages are disputed. There exist various proposals for a genetic relationship to other language families, but none of these are generally accepted; lingusts such as Igor M. Diakonoff and Sergei Starostin attempted to link the Hurro-Urartian language family to the Northeast Caucasian languages. Jørgen Læssøe argued that attempts to trace a relationship between the Hurrian and Caucasian languages must be regarded as misconcieved, owing to the lack of evidence. However, that the Hurro-Urartian languages as a whole shared a common ancestor with some of the numerous and obscure languages of the Caucasus, is not unlikely.

It has been hypothesized that the Sumerian and Hurro-Urartian languages are linguistic relatives, suggesting that they descend from a common Sumerian-Hurro-Urartian protolanguage. This hypothesis appears to be very unlikely.

The Hurrians adopted the Akkadian language and Cuneiform script for their own writing about 2000 BC. Texts in the Hurrian language in cuneiform have been found at Hattusa, Ugarit (Ras Shamra), as well as in one of the longest of the Amarna letters (EA 27), written by King Tushratta of Mitanni to Pharaoh Amenhotep III. It was the only long Hurrian text known until a multi-tablet collection of literature in Hurrian with a Hittite translation was discovered at Hattusa in 1983.

== Obsolete racial theories ==
Multiple authors have previously classified the physical traits of the Hurrians as belonging to the now-obsolete "Armenoid race". According to Philip K. Hitti, the Armenoid type belonged to the eastern branch of the obsolete Alpine race and was characterized by a prominent nose and a broad, short skull; he identified the Hurrians as among its representatives. Orientalist Bedřich Hrozný similarly described the physical traits of the Hurrians and Subarians as including brachycephaly and large noses, which he classified as Armenoid or Alpine features. Ephraim A. Speiser explained that a large portion of the Alpine race was notable for its brachycephalic skulls; to that group the term "Armenoid" was universally applied, and its branch included the Hurrians among the Aegeans, Anatolians, Elamites and Khaldians.

The Subarians, a hypothetical people sometimes associated with the Hurrians, were described in Akkadian literature as a people of light complexion (ruddy or fair skinned). In the city of Babylon, Subarian female slaves were often valued for their fair and pleasant appearance. In Akkadian inscriptions, however, such characteristics are not attributed to the Hurrians. But during the second and first millennia BC, "Subarian" was used as a synonym for Hurrians, as the term "Hurrian" was not generally in use by the Akkadians.

== Archaeology ==
Hurrian settlements are distributed over three modern countries, Iraq, Syria and Turkey. The heart of the Hurrian world is bisected by the modern border between Syria and Turkey. Several sites are situated within the border zone, making access for excavations problematic. A threat to the ancient sites are the many dam projects in the Euphrates, Tigris and Khabur valleys. Several rescue operations have already been undertaken when the construction of dams put entire river valleys under water.

The first major excavations of Hurrian sites in Iraq and Syria began in the 1920s and 1930s. They were led by the American archaeologist Edward Chiera at Yorghan Tepe (Nuzi), and the British archaeologist Max Mallowan at Chagar Bazar and Tell Brak. Recent excavations and surveys in progress are conducted by American, Belgian, Danish, Dutch, French, German and Italian teams of archaeologists, with international participants, in cooperation with the Syrian Department of Antiquities. The tells, or city mounds, often reveal a long occupation beginning in the Neolithic and ending in the Roman period or later. The characteristic Hurrian pottery, the Khabur ware, is helpful in determining the different strata of occupation within the mounds. The Hurrian settlements are usually identified from the Middle Bronze Age to the end of the Late Bronze Age, with Tell Mozan (Urkesh) being the main exception.

=== Important sites ===
The list includes some important ancient sites from the area dominated by the Hurrians. Excavation reports and images are found at the websites linked. As noted above, important discoveries of Hurrian culture and history were also made at Alalakh, Amarna, Hattusa and Ugarit.

- Urkesh (Tell Mozan)
- Nuzi (Yorghan Tepe)
- Nagar (Tell Brak)
- Shehna and Shubat-Enlil (Tell Leilan)
- Kahat (Tell Barri)
- Nabada (Tell Beydar)
- Tell Tuneinir
- Umm el-Marra (Tuba?)
- Tell Chuera
- Tell Hammam et-Turkman (Zalpa?)
- Tell Sabi Abyad
- Hamoukar
- Chagar Bazar
- Tell Fekheriye (Sikkan, Washukanni?)
- Tall Al-Hamidiya (Taidu?)

== Genetics ==
Alwin Kloekhorst (2023) suggested that the spread of Caucasus hunter-gatherer ancestry may be genetically traceable to the movements of Hurrian-speakers from the Caucasus, who moved into eastern Anatolia and northern Mesopotamia during the fourth and third millennia BC.

While not directly referring to the Hurrians, a study focused on the genomic history of the Middle East from 2021, found ancestry that is present in all Middle Easterns today; this ancestry was not present in the Levant until the Bronze Age, when 50% of the local ancestry was replaced by a population that potentially introduced the Y-chromosome haplogroup J1 into the region. This coincides with the arrival of the Hurrians, who similarly constituted an increasing proportion of the Levantine population during the Bronze Age.

The presumed ancestors of the Hurrians, individuals of the Kura–Araxes culture, carried the Y-chromosome haplogroups G2b, J-CTS1460 (x2), J-Z1842, J-M67, and R1b1-M415 (xM269), reflecting a mixture of lineages with deep Near Eastern and Caucasian origins. Kura–Araxes individuals also shared a significant portion of their ancestry with Caucasus hunter-gatherers (CHG), Anatolian Chalcolithic populations, and Upper Mesopotamian Farmers. The data indicate a largely stable genetic profile over time, with limited gene flow from Steppe populations, distinguishing them from later Bronze Age groups that incorporated more Yamnaya-related ancestry.

A genetic study by Lazaridis et al. 2022 found that Neolithic Anatolians descended from both local hunter-gatherers and populations from the Caucasus, Mesopotamia and the Levant. From around 6,500 years ago, the spread of eastern-related ancestry across the Anatolian peninsula contributed to greater genetic homogeneity among Anatolians. The authors suggested that earlier forms of the Hattic and Hurrian languages were likely spoken by migrants and locals who participated in this genetic mixture.

== See also ==
- Horites
- Nairi
- Hurrian songs
