= Ancient Near Eastern Texts Relating to the Old Testament =

Anthology of texts in Biblical archaeology

- Title page for Ancient Near Eastern Texts Relating to the Old Testament (3rd edition, 1969)
- Editor: James B. Pritchard
- Genre: Religion
- Publication date: 1950

Ancient Near Eastern Texts Relating to the Old Testament edited by James B. Pritchard (1st ed. 1950, 2nd ed. 1955, 3rd ed. 1969) is an anthology of important historical, legal, mythological, liturgical, and secular texts in biblical archaeology.

== Description ==
In spite of the name, the included texts have broad coverage and do not necessarily relate to the Old Testament. William W. Hallo, writing in the Journal of the American Oriental Society in 1970, described it as "a modern classic ever since its first appearance in 1950", because "for the first time it assembled some of the most significant Ancient Near Eastern texts in authoritative, generously annotated English translations based on the accumulated insight of several generations of scholarship scattered". It is conventional to cite the work as ANET. ANEP refers to a companion volume Ancient Near Eastern Pictures Relating to the Old Testament (1st ed. 1954, 2nd ed. 1969), featuring 882 black and white designs and photos. An additional volume of supplementary texts and pictures was published in 1969 as "The Ancient Near East: Supplementary Texts and Pictures Relating to the Old Testament". An abridgement of ANET and ANEP was published in a single volume in 1958 as "The Ancient Near East, Volume I: An Anthology of Texts and Pictures" with a 2nd edition published in 1965. A second anthology of supplementary material was published in 1975 as "Ancient Near East, Volume 2: A New Anthology of Texts and Pictures".

== Publication ==
The book was published by Princeton University Press, Princeton, New Jersey, in 1950. A second edition, corrected and enlarged, appeared in 1955. A third further enlarged edition appeared in 1969.

== Contents ==
I. Myths, Epics and Legends: Egyptian (John A. Wilson); Sumerian (S. N. Kramer); Akkadian (E. A. Speiser); Hittite (Albrecht Goetze); Ugaritic (H. L. Ginsberg)

- Egyptian
    - The Memphite Theology of Creation
    - The Deliverance of Mankind of Destruction
    - The Story of Sinuhe
    - The Story of Two Brothers
    - The Journey of Wen-Amon to Phoenicia
    - The Tradition of Seven Lean Years in Egypt
  - Mesopotamian
    - A Sumerian Myth-The Deluge
    - The Akkadian Creation Epic (Enuma Elish)
    - The Epic of Gilgamesh
    - An Akkadian Cosmological Incantation: The Worm and the Toothache
    - Adapa (Akkadian)
    - Descent of Ishtar to the Nether World (Akkadian)
    - The Legend of Sargon (Akkadian)
  - Hittite
    - The Telepinus Myth
  - Ugaritic
    - Poem about Baal and Anath (the Baal Cycle)
    - The Tale of Aqhat

II. Legal Texts: Mesopotamia and Asia Minor; Egyptian and Hittite Treaties; Hittite Instructions (Albrecht Goetze); Documents from the Practice of Law

  - Laws of Eshnunna
  - The Code of Hammurabi
  - Mesopotamian Legal Documents
  - Aramaic Papyri from Elephantine

III. Historical Texts: Egyptian (John A. Wilson); Babylonian and Assyrian (A. Leo Oppenheim); Hittite (Albrecht Goetze); Palestinian Inscriptions (W. F. Albright)

- Egyptian
  - The Expulsion of the Hyksos
  - Asiatic Campaign of Thut-mose III
  - The Campaign of Seti I in North Palestine
  - The Report of a Frontier Official
  - A Syrian Interregnum
  - The War Against the Peoples of the Sea
  - The Meggido Ivories
  - The Campaign of Sheshonk
- Assyrian & Babylonian
  - Ashurnasirpal II (883–859): Expedition to Lebanon
  - Adad-nirari III (810–783): The Fight against the Aramaean Coalition
  - Tiglath-pileser III (744–727): The Campaigns Against Syria and Israel
  - Sargon II (721–705): The Fall of Samaria
  - Sennacherib (704–681): The Siege of Jerusalem
  - Esarhaddon (680–669): The Syro-Israel Campaign
  - Receipt of Tribute from Israel
- Historiographic
  - The Fall of Ninevah
  - The Fall of Jerusalem
  - The Fall of Babylon
  - Nebuchadnezzar II (605–562)
  - Cyrus (557–529)

Also:

1. Rituals, Incantations and Descriptions of Festivals: Egyptian (John A. Wilson); Akkadian (A. Sachs); Hittite (Albrecht Goetze)
2. Hymns and Prayers: Egyptian (John A. Wilson); Sumerian (S. N. Kramer); Sumero-Akkadian (Ferris J. Stephens); Hittite (Albrecht Goetze)
3. Didactic and Wisdom Literature: Fables and Didactic Tales; Proverbs and Precepts; Observations on Life and the World Order; Oracles and Prophecies
4. Lamentations: A Sumerian Lamentation (S. N. Kramer)
5. Secular Songs and Poems: Egyptian (John A. Wilson)
6. Letters: Egyptian (John A. Wilson); Sumerian (S. N. Kramer); Akkadian (W. F. Albright); Aramaic (H. L. Ginsberg)
7. Miscellaneous Texts: Egyptian (John A. Wilson); Sumerian Love Song (S. N. Kramer); Hittite Omen (Albrecht Goetze); Canaanite and Aramaic Inscriptions (Franz Rosenthal); South-Arabian Inscriptions (A. Jamme)

=== Translators and annotators ===
- W. F. Albright, Johns Hopkins University
- H. L. Ginsberg, Jewish Theological Seminary
- Albrecht Goetze, Yale University
- A. Jamme, Society of White Fathers of Africa
- S. N. Kramer, University of Pennsylvania
- Theophile J. Meek, University of Toronto
- A. Leo Oppenheim, University of Chicago
- Robert H. Pfeiffer, Harvard University
- Franz Rosenthal, University of Pennsylvania
- Abraham Sachs, Brown University
- E. A. Speiser, University of Pennsylvania
- Ferris J. Stephens, Yale University
- John A. Wilson, University of Chicago

== See also ==
- Ancient near eastern cosmology
- Wisdom literature

== Sources ==
- Pritchard, James B. (1950) Ancient Near Eastern texts relating to the Old Testament, Princeton University Press, 1st edition BooksGoogle snippets/search
