= History of poetry =

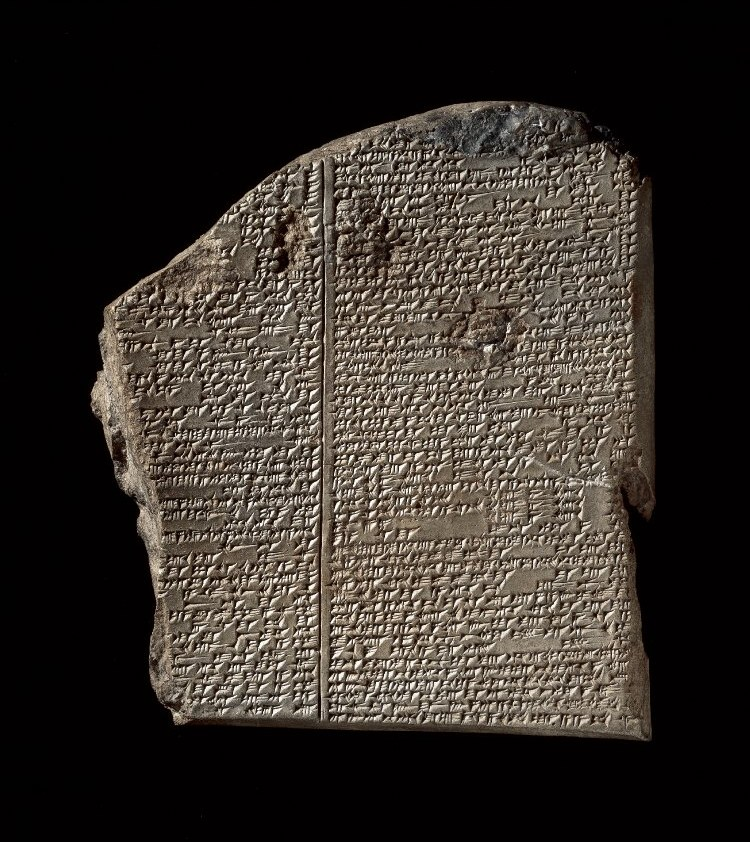
The Deluge tablet, carved in stone, of the Gilgamesh epic in Akkadian, circa 2nd millennium BC.

Poetry as an oral art form likely predates written text. The earliest poetry is believed to have been recited or sung, employed as a way of remembering oral history, genealogy, and law. Poetry is often closely related to musical traditions, and the earliest poetry exists in the form of hymns (such as Hymn to the Death of Tammuz), and other types of song such as chants. As such, poetry is often a verbal art. Many of the poems surviving from the ancient world are recorded prayers, or stories about religious subject matter, but they also include historical accounts, instructions for everyday activities, love songs, and fiction.

Many scholars, particularly those researching the Homeric tradition and the oral epics of the Balkans, suggest that early writing shows clear traces of older oral traditions, including the use of repeated phrases as building blocks in larger poetic units. A rhythmic and repetitious form would make a long story easier to remember and retell, before writing was available as a reminder. Thus, to aid memorization and oral transmission, surviving works from prehistoric and ancient societies appear to have been first composed in a poetic form – from the Vedas (1500–1000 BCE) to the Odyssey (800–675 BCE). (Note: For a recent summary discussion, see Ahl (1996). Others suggest that poetry did not necessarily predate writing. See, for example, Goody (1987).) Poetry appears among the earliest records of most literate cultures, with poetic fragments found on early monoliths, runestones, and stelae.

== Early poetry ==
Some scholars believe that the art of poetry may predate literacy, and developed from folk epics and other oral genres. Others, however, suggest that poetry did not necessarily predate writing.

The oldest surviving speculative fiction poem is the Tale of the Shipwrecked Sailor, written in Hieratic and ascribed a date around 2500 BCE. The oldest surviving epic poem, the Epic of Gilgamesh, dates from the 3rd millennium BCE in Sumer (in Mesopotamia, present-day Iraq), and was written in cuneiform script on clay tablets and, later, on papyrus. The Istanbul tablet#2461, dating to c. 2000 BCE, describes an annual rite in which the king symbolically married and mated with the goddess Inanna to ensure fertility and prosperity; some have labelled it the world's oldest love poem. An example of Egyptian epic poetry is The Story of Sinuhe (c. 1800 BCE).

Other ancient epics includes the Greek Iliad and the Odyssey; the Persian Avestan books (the Yasna); the Roman national epic, Virgil's Aeneid (written between 29 and 19 BCE); and the Indian epics, the Ramayana and the Mahabharata. Epic poetry appears to have been composed in poetic form as an aid to memorization and oral transmission in ancient societies.

Other forms of poetry, including such ancient collections of religious hymns as the Indian Sanskrit-language Rigveda, the Avestan Gathas, the Hurrian songs, and the Hebrew Psalms, possibly developed directly from folk songs. The earliest entries in the oldest extant collection of Chinese poetry, the Classic of Poetry (Shijing), were initially lyrics. The Shijing, with its collection of poems and folk songs, was heavily valued by the philosopher Confucius and is considered to be one of the official Confucian classics. His remarks on the subject have become an invaluable source in ancient music theory.

The efforts of ancient thinkers to determine what makes poetry distinctive as a form, and what distinguishes good poetry from bad, resulted in "poetics"—the study of the aesthetics of poetry. Some ancient societies, such as China's through the Shijing, developed canons of poetic works that had ritual as well as aesthetic importance. More recently, thinkers have struggled to find a definition that could encompass formal differences as great as those between Chaucer's Canterbury Tales and Matsuo Bashō's Oku no Hosomichi, as well as differences in content spanning Tanakh religious poetry, love poetry, and rap.

Until recently, the earliest examples of stressed poetry had been thought to be works composed by Romanos the Melodist (fl. 6th century CE). However, Tim Whitmarsh writes that an inscribed Greek poem predated Romanos' stressed poetry.

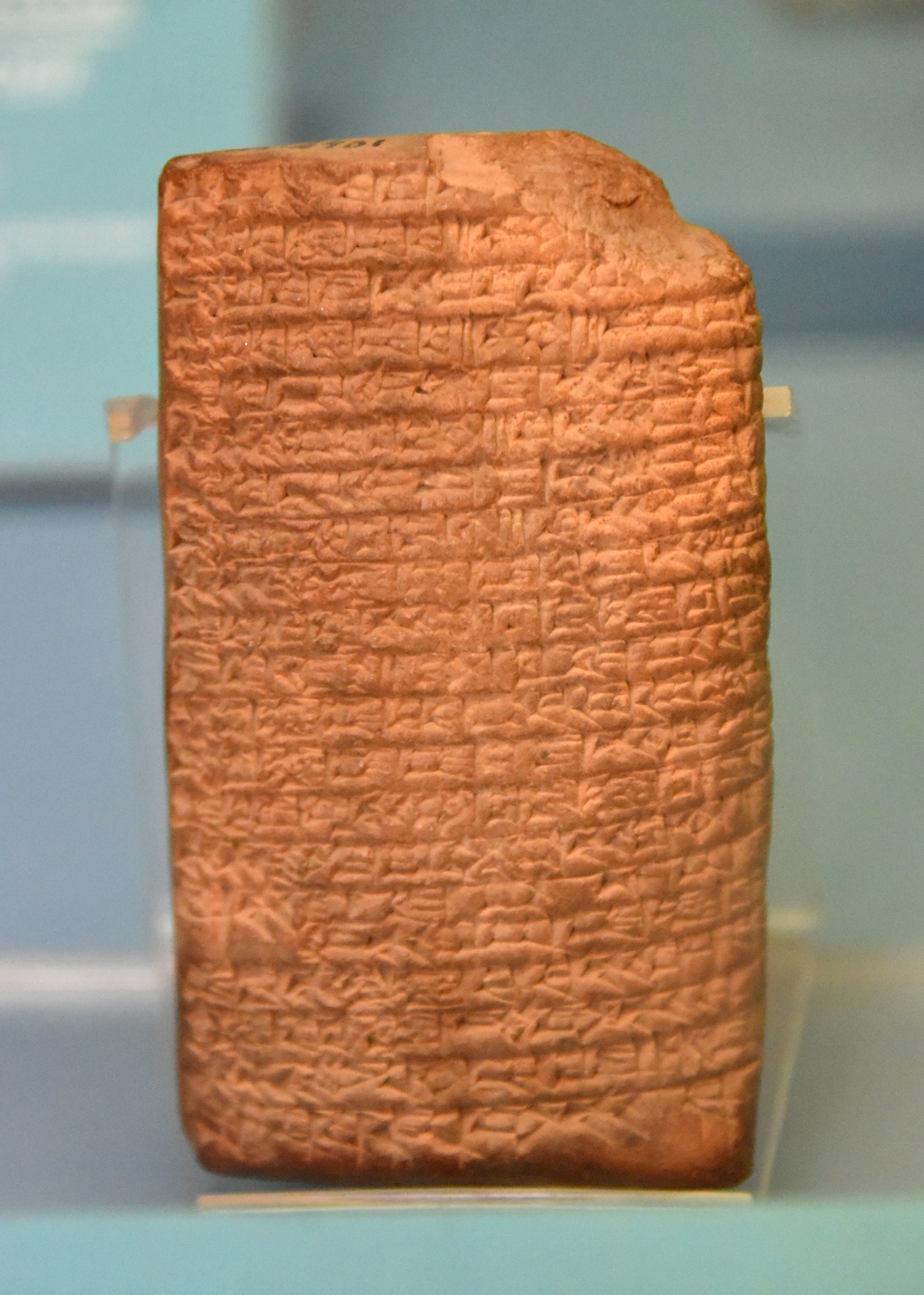
The oldest known love poem. Sumerian terracotta tablet#2461 from Nippur, Iraq. Ur III period, 2037–2029 BCE. Ancient Orient Museum, Istanbul

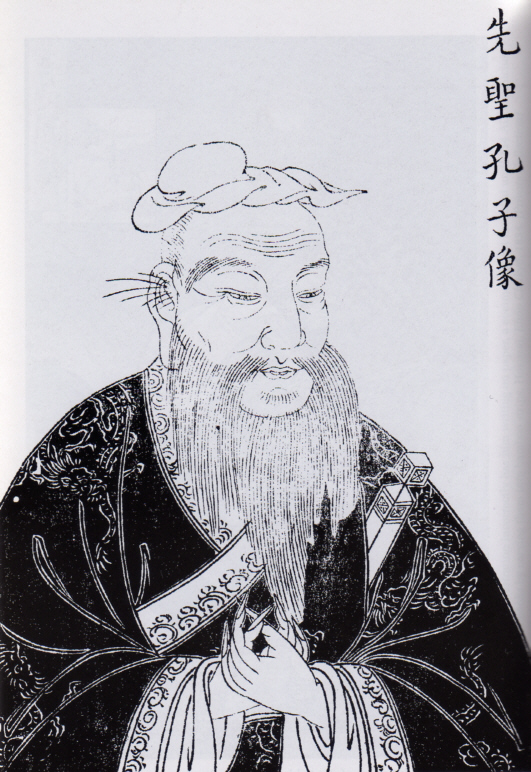
The philosopher Confucius was influential in the developed approach to poetry and ancient music theory.

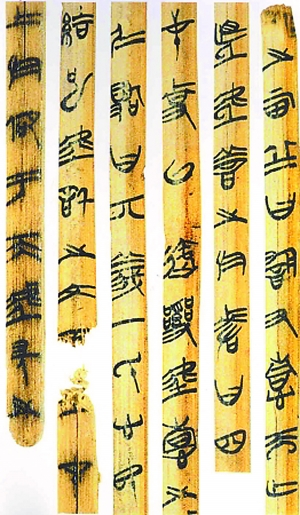
An early Chinese poetics, the Kǒngzǐ Shīlùn (孔子詩論), discussing the Shijing (Classic of Poetry)

== Ancient African poetry ==
In Africa, poetry has a history dating back to prehistorical times with the creation of hunting poetry, and panegyric and elegiac court poetry were developed extensively throughout the history of the empires of the Nile, Niger, and Volta river valleys. Some of the earliest written poetry in Africa can be found among the Pyramid Texts written during the 25th century BCE, while the Epic of Sundiata is one of the most well-known examples of griot court poetry. In African cultures, performance poetry is traditionally a part of theatrics, which was present in all aspects of pre-colonial African life and whose theatrical ceremonies had many different functions, including political, educative, spiritual and entertainment.

Poetics were an element of theatrical performances of local oral artists, linguists and historians, accompanied by local instruments of the people such as the kora, the xalam, the mbira and the djembe drum. Drumming for accompaniment is not to be confused with performances of the talking drum, which is a literature of its own, since it is a distinct method of communication that depends on conveying meaning through non-musical grammatical, tonal and rhythmic rules imitating speech. Although, these performances could be included in those of griots.

== Classical and early modern Western traditions ==
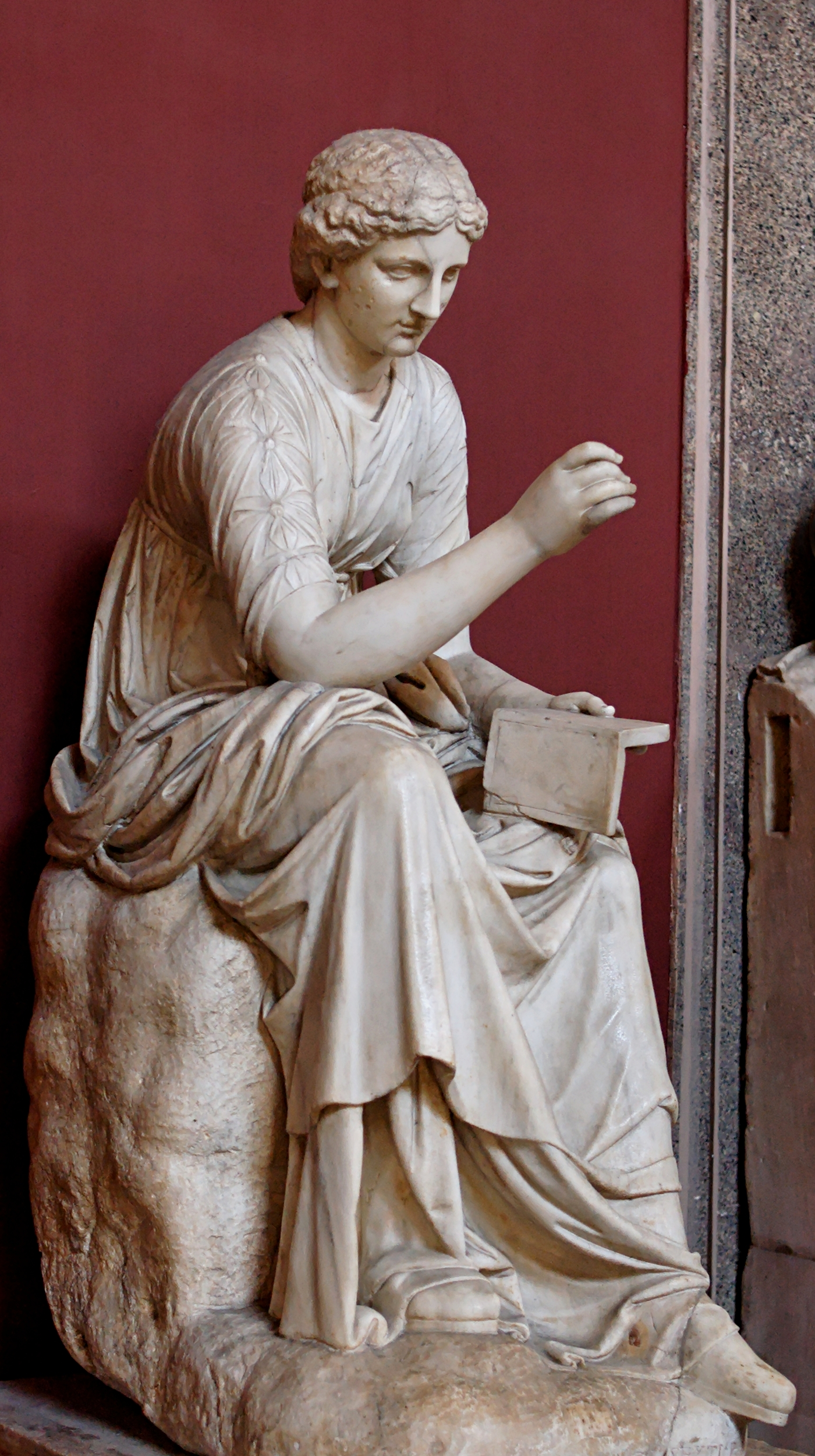
Calliope, the muse of heroic poetry

Classical thinkers employed classification as a way to define and assess the quality of poetry. In book III of the Republic, Plato defined poetry as a narrative genre separated into three types: the "simple," the "imitative," or some mix of the two. He also famously, in book X, condemned poetry as evil, being only capable of creating deceptive and ineffectual copies of real-world corollaries.

In his Poetics, Aristotle taxonomized ancient Greek drama (which he called "poetry") into three subcategories: epic, comic, and tragic. Aristotle developed rules to distinguish the highest-quality poetry of each genre, based on the underlying purposes of that genre. Later aestheticians identified three major genres: Epic poetry, lyric poetry, and dramatic poetry (treating comedy and tragedy as subgenres of dramatic poetry). Aristotle's work was influential throughout the Middle East during the Islamic Golden Age, (Note: Ibn Rushd (Averroes) wrote a commentary on Aristotle's Poetics, replacing the original examples with passages from Arabic poets.) as well as in Europe during the Renaissance.

Like Aristotle, subsequent poets and aestheticians often distinguished poetry from, and defined it in opposition to, prose, which was generally understood as writing with a proclivity to logical explication and global trade. In addition to a boom in translation, during the Romantic period numerous ancient works were rediscovered.

== History and development of Chinese poetry ==
The character which means "poetry", in the ancient Chinese Great Seal script style. The modern character is 詩/诗 (shī).

The Classic of Poetry, often known by its original name of the Odes or Poetry is the earliest existing collection of Chinese poems and songs. This poetry collection comprises 305 poems and songs dating from the 11th to the 7th century BCE. The stylistic development of Classical Chinese poetry consists of both literary and oral cultural processes, which are conventionally assigned to certain standard periods or eras, corresponding with Chinese Dynastic Eras, the traditional chronological process for Chinese historical events.

The poems preserved in written form constitute the poetic literature. Furthermore, there is or were parallel traditions of oral and traditional poetry also known as popular or folk poems or ballads. Some of these poems seem to have been preserved in written form. Generally, the folk type of poems they are anonymous, and may show signs of having been edited or polished in the process of fixing them in written characters. Besides the Classic of Poetry, or Shijing, another early text is the Songs of the South (or, Chuci), although some individual pieces or fragments survive in other forms, for example embedded in classical histories or other literature.

== Medieval poetry ==
Poetry took numerous forms in medieval Europe, for example, lyric and epic poetry. The troubadours, trouvères, and the minnesänger are known for composing their lyric poetry about courtly love usually accompanied by an instrument.

=== Old English poetry ===
Old English religious poetry includes the poem Christ by Cynewulf and the poem The Dream of the Rood, preserved in both manuscript form and on the Ruthwell Cross. We do have some secular poetry; in fact a great deal of medieval literature was written in verse, including the Old English epic Beowulf. Scholars are fairly sure, based on a few fragments and on references in historic texts, that much lost secular poetry was set to music, and was spread by traveling minstrels, or bards, across Europe. Thus, the few poems written eventually became ballads or lays, and never made it to being recited without song or other music.

=== Medieval Latin poetry ===
In medieval Latin, while verse in the old quantitative meters continued to be written, a new more popular form called the sequence arose, which was based on accentual metres in which metrical feet were based on stressed syllables rather than vowel length. These metres were associated with Christian hymnody.

However, much secular poetry was also written in Latin. Some poems and songs, like the Gambler's Mass (officio lusorum) from the Carmina Burana, were parodies of Christian hymns, while others were student melodies: folksongs, love songs and drinking ballads. The famous commercium song Gaudeamus igitur is one example. There are also a few narrative poems of the period, such as the unfinished epic Ruodlieb, which tells us the story of a knight's adventures.

== Lyric poetry ==
Lyric poetry grew to be popular in around the 19th century, with the addition of radio as they could broadcast to the world the earliest 'songs', although radio wasn't actually widely popular until well into the 20th century. Lyric poetry is very similar to songs / song lyrics. They could have as many stanzas as they wanted, which was different to different forms of poetry at the time. There were no real regulations to this new form of poetry, which was invented by Sir Robert Cite in 1789. This form of poetry is known for being the quickest growing type of the past millennium. To this day, lyric poetry is the most used and important of poetries, and is used throughout the world.

== Modern developments ==
The development of modern poetry is generally seen as having started at the beginning of the 20th century and extends into the 21st century. Among its major American practitioners who write in English are T.S. Eliot, Robert Frost, Wallace Stevens, Maya Angelou, June Jordan, Allen Ginsberg, and Nobel laureate Louise Glück. Among the modern epic poets are Ezra Pound, H.D., Derek Walcott, and Giannina Braschi. Contemporary poets Joy Harjo, Kevin Young, and Natasha Trethewey write poetry in the lyric form.

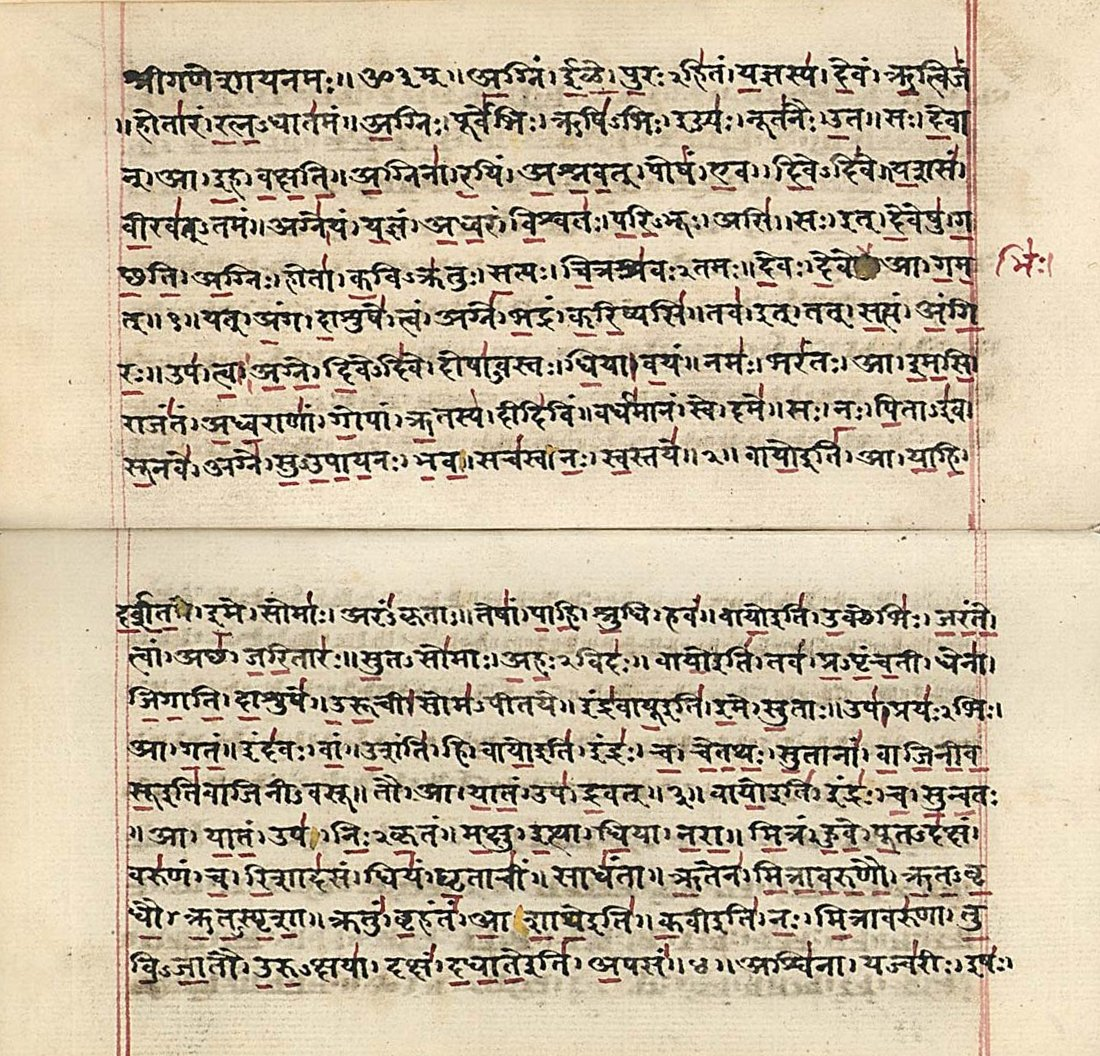
Manuscript of the Rig Veda, Sanskrit verse composed in the 2nd millennium BC.

== See also ==
- History of literature
