= Ea-niša =

Ea-niša (fl. c. 2050 BC) was a lesser wife of Shulgi, king of the Third Dynasty of Ur, at the end of the third millennium BC. Ea-niša is known from a large number of sources, making it possible to reconstruct to a certain extent her life.

Very little is known about her family background. She had a brother called Iddin-Ea. A son is mentioned in a legal document. The reading of his name there is uncertain. Ea-niša is known from a large number of cuneiform texts, providing evidence for her position at the royal court and her economic power. She was head of an estate that was mainly administered by men. The estate included cattle, but there is also evidence of textile production there. She is attested in texts from Uruk and Ur and might have lived at both places. A surviving inscription states that she ordered the construction of a statue of her husband.

Ea-niša survived her husband and lived into the reign of Shu-Sin. It seems that she retired to an estate around Umma, but she is still mentioned in festival lists, indicating that she participated in festivals at the royal court.
