= Ephraim Avigdor Speiser =

American Assyriologist (1902–1965)

- Born: January 24, 1902; Skalat, Galicia
- Died: June 15, 1965 (aged 63); Elkins Park, Pennsylvania
- Occupation: Harrison Research Fellow in Semitics at the University of Pennsylvania
- Known for: discovery of the ancient site of Tepe Gawra
- Spouse: Sue Gimbel Dannenbaum

Academic background
- Education: Dropsie College (Ph.D.)

Academic work
- Discipline: Assyriologist
- Sub-discipline: Archaeology, Biblical commentator
- Institutions: University of Pennsylvania
- Notable students: Moshe Greenberg and Anne Draffkorn Kilmer
- Notable works: Genesis (AYB)

Ephraim Avigdor Speiser (January 24, 1902 – June 15, 1965) was a Polish-born American Assyriologist and translator of the Torah. He discovered the ancient site of Tepe Gawra in 1927 and supervised its excavation between 1931 and 1938.

Speiser was married to Sue Gimbel Dannenbaum, granddaughter of Charles Gimbel of the Gimbel Brothers. They had two children together, Jean and Joel.

== Early life ==
Speiser was born in Skalat, Galicia (then in Austrian Poland, now Ukraine) on January 24, 1902. He went to school in Lemberg (later called Lwow, now Lviv), attending the Imperial Gymnasium of Lemberg and later graduating from the College of Lemberg in 1918. Two years later, at the age of 18, he emigrated to the United States and eventually became a US citizen in 1926.

In the United States, Speiser received his M.A. in Semitics at the University of Pennsylvania in 1923, studying under J.A. Montgomery and Max Margolis. He continued his studies under Max Margolis and earned his Ph.D. from Dropsie College in Philadelphia in 1924.

== Career ==
From 1924 to 1926, Speiser was a Harrison Research Fellow in Semitics at the University of Pennsylvania. In 1926, he won a Guggenheim Fellowship to study the remains of the ancient Mitanni and Hurrians in northern Iraq. The members of the Mittani-Hurrian tribes still spoke Hittite; Speiser was one of few in the United States who could speak the language.

In 1927, while in northern Iraq, Speiser discovered the Tepe Gawra (or “Great Mound”), one of the earliest known examples of civilization. During this time, he was director of the Baghdad School of the American Schools of Oriental Research and taught at the Hebrew University in Jerusalem.

From 1930-32 and 1936–37, Speiser served as field director of the Joint Excavation of the American Schools of Oriental Research and the University Museum, undertaking excavations in Tepe Gawra and Tell Billa, also known as Shibaniba. In 1936, Speiser also took over the position as field director for the excavation of the Sumerian site of Khafajeh after the University Museum took it over from the Oriental Institute in Chicago.

In 1928 he was appointed assistant professor of Semitics at the University of Pennsylvania, and full professor in 1931. Only a few years later, he was appointed as Chairman of the Department of Oriental Studies, a position he used to develop the study of Assyriology at the University of Pennsylvania.

During World War II, Speiser left academia to become chief of the Office of Strategic Services' Near East Section of the Research and Analysis Branch in Washington, D.C. This position earned him a Certificate of Merit. He was one of many American students and scholars of Orientalism who entered and served in the intelligence services during World War II.

Following the war, he returned to the University of Pennsylvania as Chairman of the Department of Oriental Studies from 1947 until his death in 1965. While there, he was appointed A.M. Ellis Professor of Hebrew and Semitic Languages and Literatures in 1954.

Beginning in 1955, Speiser joined the translation committee of the Jewish Publication Society of America’s Bible translation project that produced an English version of the Torah.

Speiser also held positions as president of the American Oriental Society, Vice President of the American Association for Middle East Studies, Vice President of the Linguistic Society of America, a fellow of the American Academy for Jewish Research, and a member of the American Philosophical Society. He was also given an honorary doctorate in Hebrew Letters by the Hebrew Union College and was appointed to its Archeological School’s board of overseers.

In 1964, a year prior to his death, Speiser was named a university professor at the University of Pennsylvania, indicating his multidisciplinary work and achievements. On June 15, 1965, Speiser died in Elkins Park, Pennsylvania.

== Selected works ==
- Speiser, Ephraim Avigdor (1930). Mesopotamian Origins: the Basic Population of the Near East. Philadelphia: University of Pennsylvania Press.
- ——— (1930). New Kirkuk Documents relating to Family Laws. New Haven.
- ——— (1935). Excavations at Tepe Gawra. Vol. 1. Philadelphia: University of Pennsylvania Press.
- ———; Pfeiffer, Robert H. (1936). One Hundred New Selected Nuzi Texts.
- ——— (1941). Studies in the History of Science. Philadelphia: University of Pennsylvania Press.
- ——— (1941). Introduction to Hurrian. New Haven: Dows Nies.
- ——— (1947). The United States and the Near East. Cambridge (MA): Harvard University Press.
- ——— (1950). "Akkadian Myths and Epics". In James B. Pritchard (ed.). Ancient Near Eastern Texts Relating to the Old Testament. Princeton University Press.
- ——— (1964). Genesis: Introduction, Translation and Notes (The Anchor Bible). New York: Doubleday.
- ——— (1964). At the Dawn of Civilization. Rutgers University Press.
- ——— (1967). Finkelstein, J. J.; Greenberg, Moshe (eds.). Oriental and Biblical Studies: Collected Writings of E. A. Speiser. University of Pennsylvania Press.
