= Adamanduga =

Genre of literature

Adamanduga (Sumerian for "dialogue") is a Sumerian and Akkadian genre of literature, a kind of dispute. It originated in the 3rd millennium BC, and was used until the Neo-Assyrian Empire between the 9th and the 7th century BC.

== Sumerian literature ==
It is used predominantly for the description of mythological stories. It describes the beginning of the Earth's history. Then it depicts the beginning of the two fundamenta of the human culture. Dialogues are always between two new achievements. These are personalised. Both describe itself as the better one. It cites its value, beauty and usefulness. At the end of the poem one of the Gods (usually Enlil) decides who says right things. It was the first literature genre where humans were the reference for the judging of human society in the history of Mesopotamia. Its dialogues take place somewhere in Edubba. Philosophical speculations also can be found around mythological descriptions. There are some Sumerian adamandugas which survived this long period. These are for example: U and Ezinu; Enesh and Enten; Hummar and Plough; Wood and Reed; Bird and Fish; Tammuz and Enkimdu. Source of the genre is in the Edubba literature. It includes ethical, pedagogical writings. Enmerkar and the Lord of Aratta shares a lot of characteristic features with this and genre embedded to an epos. It converged to the fabula in a Summer–Akkad bilingual writing. It included dogs, wolves, lions and foxes also.

== Akkadian literature ==
There are few disputes in the genre of adamanduga in the Akkad literature. Main theme of these poetries were the relationship between human and the society instead of human and environment. Most vital parts of adamandugas were its special characters: personalisation of plants and animals. There were violent fights between them. Most important poems are Tamariskus and the Date Palm; Ox and the Horse. These had major influence in their time. Disputes in the Nisaba and the Wheat had less cultural historical background. In Myth of Etana dispute becomes fight. The characters of the epos are the Snake and the Eagle. It is the predecessor of the balbale.

You may find similar writings in the later history of Arabic, Hebrew literature and in the Middle Age from Europe.

== See also ==
- Balbale

== Sources ==
Világirodalmi lexikon I. kötet, A-Cal, ISBN 963-05-4399-0 (in Hungarian)
