= Urarteans =

Ancient people of west Asia

Ուրարտացիներ
- The Kingdom of Urartu, where the Urarteans inhabited.

Regions with significant populations
- Armenian highlands

Languages
- Urartian

Religion
- Urartian religion

Urarteans or Urartians were an ancient people who spoke the Urartian language. The territory of the ancient kingdom of Urartu extended over the modern frontiers of Turkey, Iran, Iraq, and Armenia. Its kings left behind cuneiform inscriptions in the Urartian language, a member of the Hurro-Urartian language family. A related people to the Urarteans are the Hurrians.

== History and Origin ==
It is assumed that the Urarteans spread across the Armenian highlands from the region of Rewanduz (modern-day northwestern Iran), where the ancient city of Musasir was located.

Since its re-discovery in the 19th century, Urartu, which is commonly believed to have been at least partially Armenian-speaking, has played a significant role in Armenian nationalism.

== Language ==
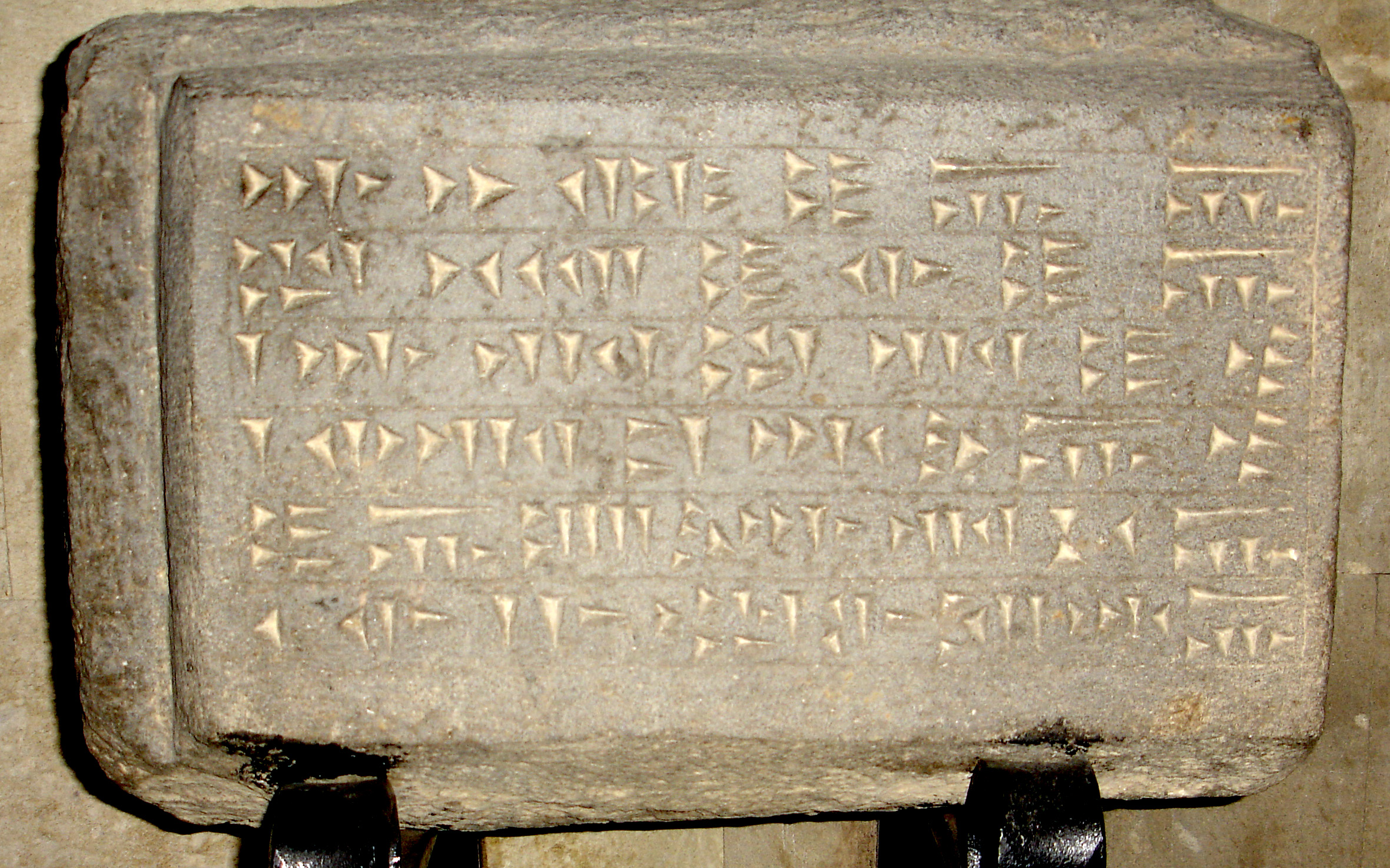
Urartian cuneiform inscription at the Erebuni Museum (Yerevan).

Urartian or Vannic is an extinct Hurro-Urartian language which was spoken by the inhabitants of the ancient kingdom of Urartu (Biaini or Biainili in Urartian, it was also called Nairi), which was centered on the region around Lake Van and had its capital, Tushpa, near the site of the modern town of Van in the Armenian highlands, now in the Eastern Anatolia region of Turkey. Its past prevalence is unknown. While some believe it was probably dominant around Lake Van and in the areas along the upper Zab valley, others believe it was spoken by a relatively small population who comprised a ruling class.

First attested in the 9th century BCE, Urartian ceased to be written after the fall of the Urartian state in 585 BCE and presumably became extinct due to the fall of Urartu. It must have had long contact with, and been gradually totally replaced by, an early form of Armenian, although it is in the 5th century CE that the earliest written examples of Armenian appear.

== Religion ==
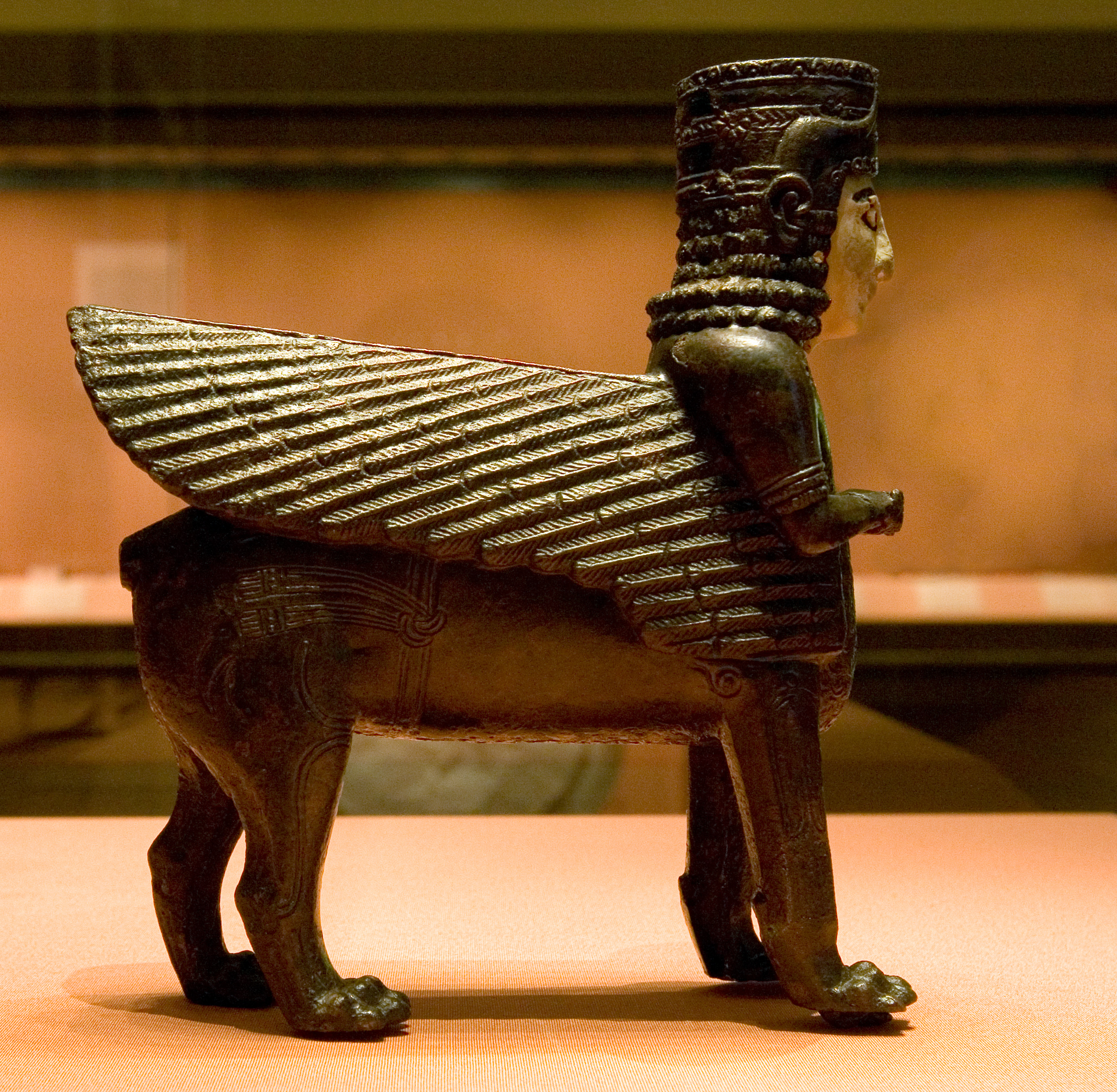
Urartian winged deity, bronze, Toprakh-kale, Hermitage.

The religious beliefs of the Urarteans shared many similarities with the religions of Mesopotamia. The Urartian pantheon included numerous deities, many of which were borrowed from the religious traditions of Sumer, Akkad and Assyria.

Sacrifices, mainly of animals (bulls and sheep), were practiced, although there is evidence of human sacrifices. Rituals of worship, usually performed in special chambers carved into the rocks, resembled ziggurats. In one such chamber, a tablet was found listing 79 Urartian deities and the number of animals that were to be sacrificed to each of them.
