= Shibaniba =

Tell Billa
- Shibaniba
- Tell Billa
- Location within Iraq
- 36°26′1″N 43°20′54″E
- Type: settlement
- Location: Nineveh Province, Iraq

Site notes
- Area: 12 ha (30 acres)
- Excavation dates: 1850, 1930–1934
- Archaeologists: A.H. Layard, E.A. Speiser, C. Bache

Tell Billa (also Tell Billah, Tall Billa, and Baasheikhah) is an archaeological site near Bashiqa in Nineveh Province (Iraq) 20 kilometers northeast of Mosul.

== History ==
The site consists of a large mound and covers around 30 acres (12 ha). There is some evidence of occupation as far back as the Uruk period, including some Hurrian presence in the middle second millennium. An Uruk period cylinder seal was found at the site, a presentation scene of Istar. A few preliterate clay tokens were also found. On Stratum V a number of copper weapons, mainly axe heads and lance butts. One lance butt was inscribed with cuneiform characters.

=== Early Bronze ===
In 2022 it was proposed that Tell Billa was the site of the Ur III period (ca 2100 BC) city Šimānum (possibly known as Asimānum during the Akkadian Empire).

=== Late Bronze ===
Beginning in Middle Assyrian times the ancient city, not far from Assur, was named Šib/manibe in the Middle Assyrian period and Šibaniba in the Neo-Assyrian period. Its earlier name is not known.

The Hurrian artifacts were identified in the excavators' Stratum 3. The comparison with the similar artifacts from Nuzi led Speiser to conclude that the Hurrians settled at Billa before they moved on to Nuzi.

The majority of excavated material, however, is from the Middle Assyrian and Neo-Assyrian times, including glyptic and epigraphic material. Ninety One Middle Assyrian tablets (ca. 1400-1000 BC) are attested from Tell Billa/Shibaniba. Several Middle Assyrian faience items were also found at Tell Billa. The name Shibaniba relates to this period of its history.

Some ceramic remains of the Parthian period were found at the site.

== Excavations ==
After some minor soundings done by Austen Henry Layard around 1850, Tell Billa was excavated between 1930 and 1934 by a team from the University of Pennsylvania and the American Schools of Oriental Research. The excavation was led by Ephraim Avigdor Speiser with Charles Bache. The work was complicated by the fact that the mound was divided up among 18 owners including a Jacobite church.

At the same time, these scholars explored the related nearby ancient site of Tepe Gawra, which is located about 8 km (5.0 mi) northeast of Billa.

== See also ==
- Cities of the ancient Near East
