= Istanbul 2461 =

Ancient love poem about sacred marriage

Istanbul #2461
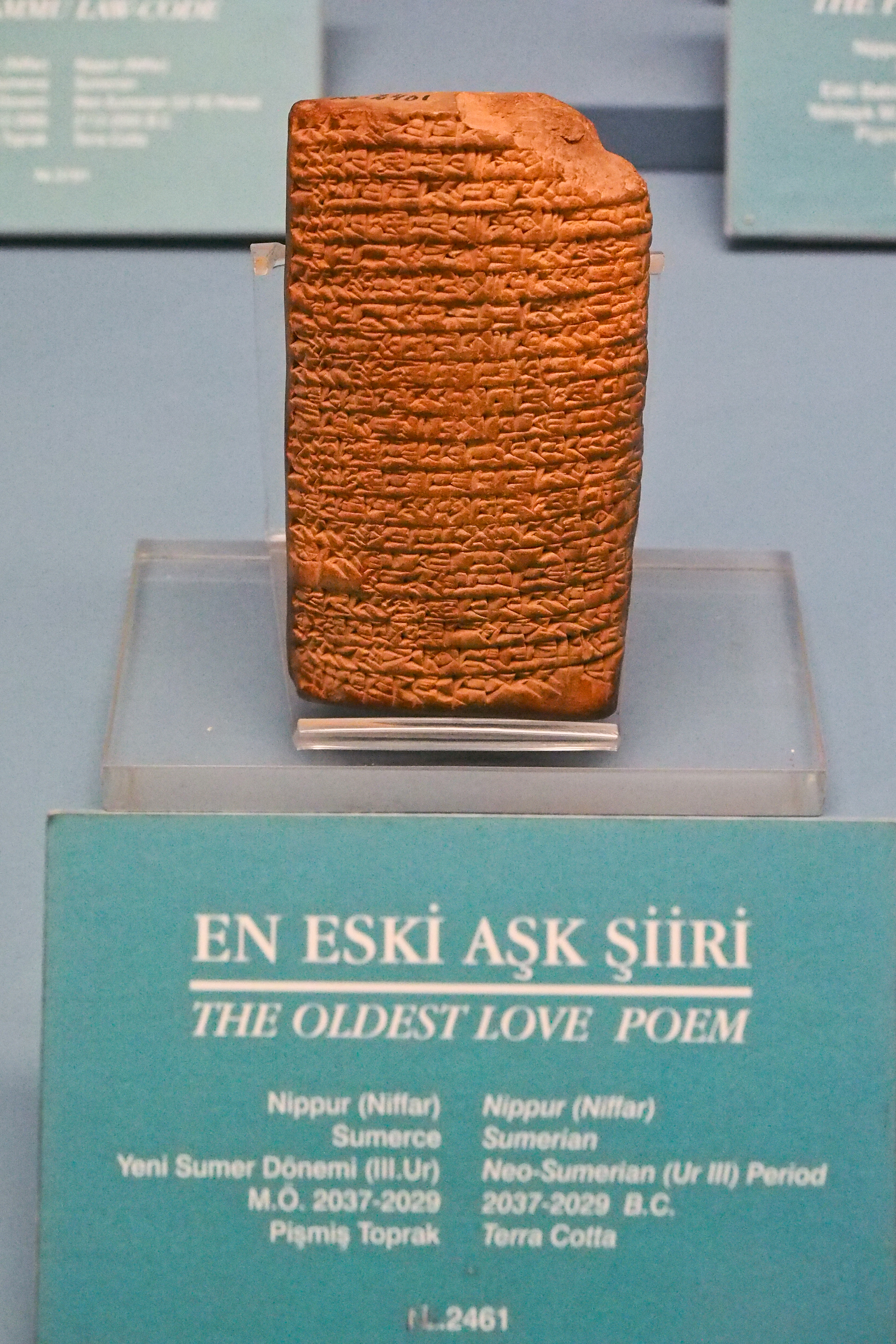
- "The Oldest Love Poem" (L.2461) on display at the Istanbul Museum of the Ancient Orient
- Material: Terracotta
- Size: 10.7 x 6 x 3.1 cm
- Writing: Sumerian language in cuneiform script
- Created: c. 2030 BC
- Discovered: before 1901; Al-Qadisiyyah, Iraq
- Present location: Istanbul Museum of the Ancient Orient, Istanbul, Turkey

Istanbul #2461 (also Ni 2461, L.2461) is an ancient Sumerian cuneiform tablet. Some have labelled it the world's oldest love poem. It is on display at the Istanbul Museum of the Ancient Orient (Mesopotamia Hall).

It is an erotic poem addressed to king Shu-Sin (reigned 20th or 21st century BC) by an unnamed female speaker. It is thought that the poem may be connected to a "sacred marriage" between the king and a priestess of Inanna.

== Discovery ==
The tablet was unearthed at Nippur, in lower Mesopotamia (modern day Iraq). It was one of several thousand Sumerian tablets found by archeologists during excavations between 1889 and 1900.

The tablet was identified among 74,000 others and translated by Samuel Kramer in 1951, during his years of studies in the Istanbul Museum. Kramer was deciding what works to translate next when he found the tablet in the museum drawer. He describes the moment in his book History Begins at Sumer:

The little tablet numbered 2461 was lying in one of the drawers, surrounded by a number of other pieces. When I first laid eyes on it, its most attractive feature was its state of preservation. I soon realized that I was reading a poem, divided into a number of stanzas, which celebrated beauty and love, a joyous bride and a king named Shu-Sin … As I read it again and yet again, there was no mistaking its content. What I held in my hand was one of the oldest love songs written down by the hand of man.

== Contents ==
The tablet contains a balbale (a kind of Sumerian poem) which is known by the titles "Bridegroom, Spend the Night in Our House Till Dawn" or "A Love Song of Shu-Suen (Shu-Suen B)". Composed of 29 lines, this poem is a monologue directed to king Shu-Sin (ruled 1972–1964 BC, short chronology, or 2037–2029 BC, long chronology). In erotic language, the female speaker in the poem expresses her ardent desires and longings for Shu-Sin, drawing heavily on imagery related to honey and sweetness.

The following is the start of the poem (in Kramer's translation):

Bridegroom, dear to my heart,
Goodly is your beauty, honeysweet,
Lion, dear to my heart,
Goodly is your beauty, honeysweet.

The last three lines of the poem seem to contain an invitation to a sexual encounter, but in language not adequately clear to us.

The text is one of the oldest known lyric poems.

== Interpretations ==
It is believed that the poem is a script for the yearly "sacred marriage", a rite in which the king would symbolically marry the goddess Inanna, mate with her, and ensure fertility and prosperity for the coming year. A priestess would probably represent Inanna, the Sumerian goddess of fertility, and the king Shu-Sin would represent Dumuzi, the god of shepherds, on the eve of their union.

Variants of the poem may have been sung during ritual ceremonies commemorating the divine marriage between the two gods all over the ancient Near East, particularly in Egypt. The translation of this tablet shed light on the Song of Solomon in the Old Testament, because some phrases are similar to the poems sung during such fertility feasts, as well as Sumerian weddings.

Some modern scholarly interpretations suggest that this poem presents a uniquely female experience of sexuality and eroticism. The absence of a mention of pregnancy or any product of sexual intimacy, nor reference to fertility, provides possible evidence for interpretations that may align with female sexuality and pleasure-focused intimacy that is hard to find in other Sumerian poems and literature.

== Literature ==
- Sefati, Yitschak. "Sumerian Canonical Compositions. A. Divine Focus. 6. Love Poems: Dumuzi-Inanna Songs (1.169)". In The Context of Scripture, I: Canonical Compositions from the Biblical World. Hallo, William W. (ed). Leiden/New York/Köln: Brill, 1997. 541–542. (title: Bridegroom, spend the night in our house till dawn)
- Sefati, Yitschak. Love songs in Sumerian literature: critical edition of the Dumuzi-Inanna songs. Bar-Ilan Studies in Near Eastern Languages and Culture. Publications of the Samuel N. Kramer Institute of Assyriology. Ramat-Gan: Bar-Ilan University Press, 1998. 353–359.
