= Anne Draffkorn Kilmer =

- Born: 1931
- Died: 2023 (aged 92)
- Occupation: Professor of Assyriology
- Awards: Guggenheim Fellowship (1961, 1962)

Academic background
- Education: University of Pennsylvania (Ph.D.)
- Thesis: Hurrians and Hurrian at Alalakh: An Ethnolinguistic Analysis (1959)
- Doctoral advisor: Ephraim Avigdor Speiser

Academic work
- Discipline: Scholar of Ancient Mesopotamia
- Sub-discipline: Ancient Music, games, mathematics, and Sumero-Akkadian cuneiform texts
- Institutions: University of California, Berkeley

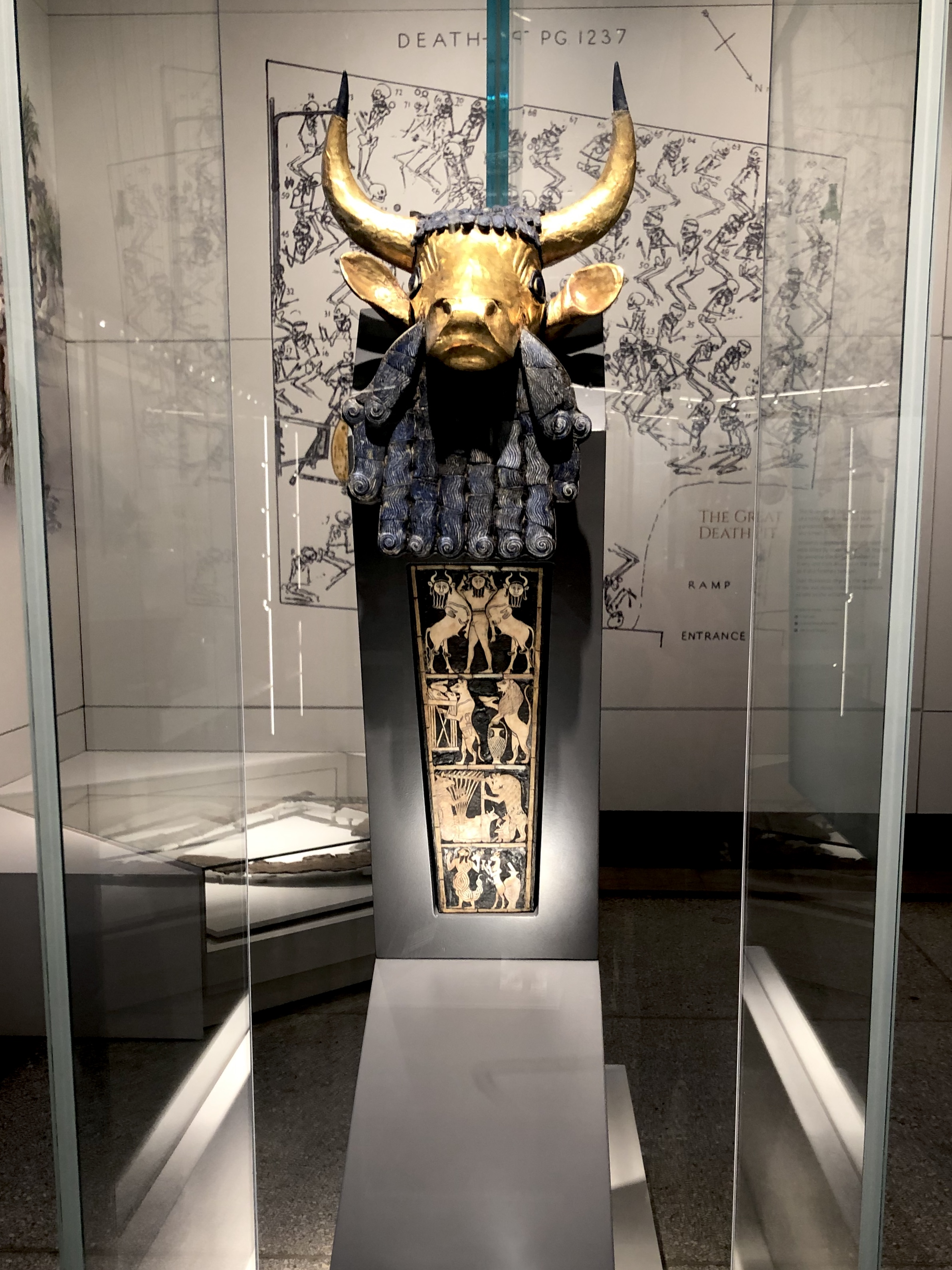
Bull Headed Lyre or Ur, Penn Museum (Philadelphia)

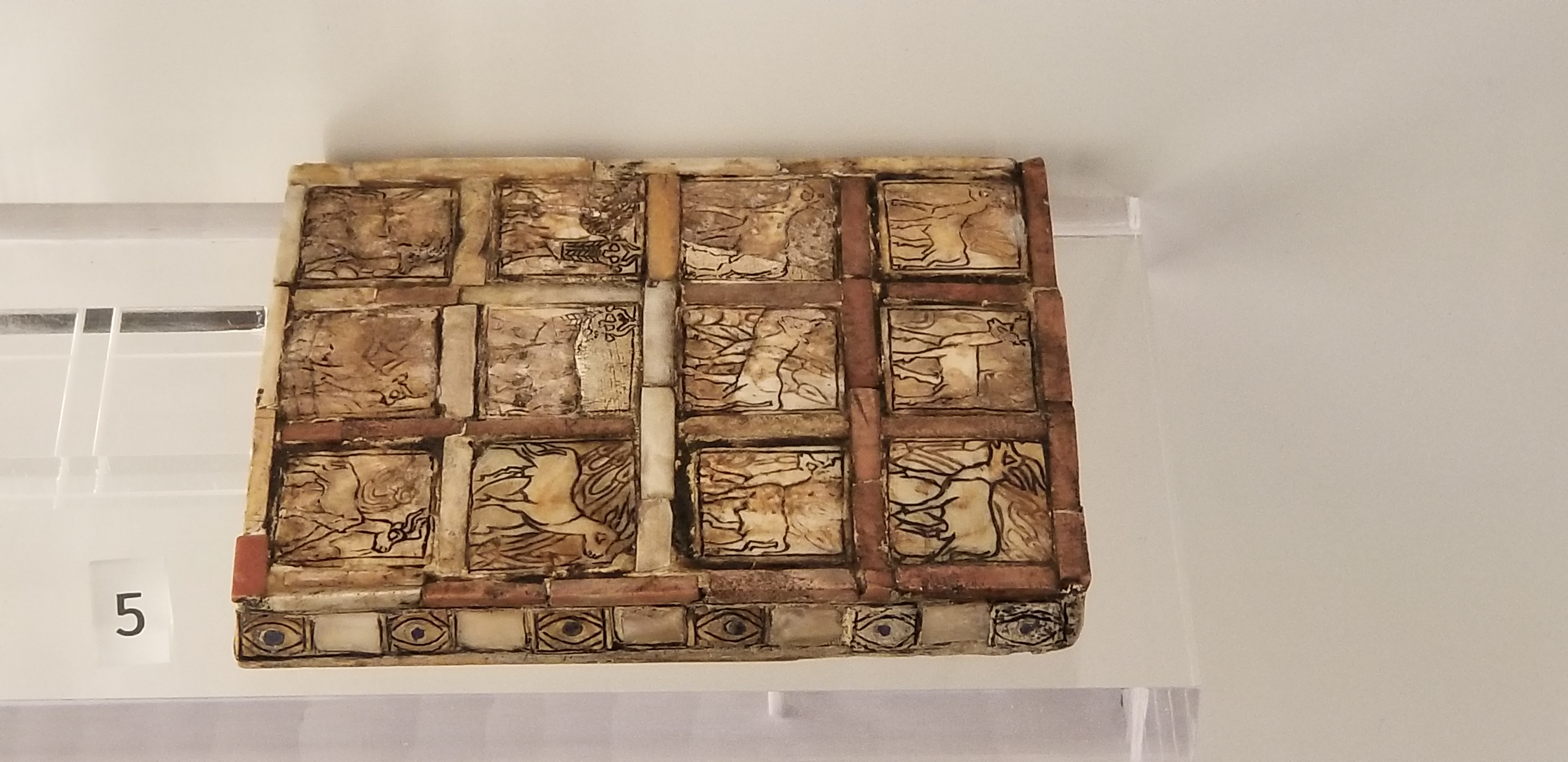
Ancient Mesopotamian Board Game, Ur (Iraq), 2450 BCE, Penn Museum (Philadelphia).

Anne Draffkorn Kilmer (1931 – 2023) was an American historian of the ancient Near East who served as a professor of Assyriology at the University of California, Berkeley. She was an expert in ancient Mesopotamian culture, specifically Sumero-Akkadian cuneiform texts and the history of ancient music, games, and mathematics. In 1963, she became the first woman appointed to a tenure-track position in what is now the Middle Eastern Languages and Cultures department at the University of California, Berkeley. She later became curator of the Babylonian collection in the Phoebe A. Hearst Museum of Anthropology, formerly the Lowie Museum. She rose to the rank of Professor, served as chair of her department three times, and acted as dean of humanities.

== Education, career, and scholarship ==
Kilmer earned her PhD at the University of Pennsylvania in 1959 for her dissertation entitled, “Hurrians and Hurrian at Alalakh: An Ethnolinguistic Analysis,” which she wrote under the supervision of Assyriologist Ephraim Avigdor Speiser, who discovered and excavated the site of Tepe Gawra. After completing her PhD, she held a research fellowship from the American Association of University Women and worked as a research assistant for Benno Landsberger at the Oriental Institute of the University of Chicago. In 1963 she took a position as a visiting lecturer in Assyriology at the University of California, Berkeley. She went on to secure a tenure-track job at Berkeley and spent the rest of her career there, until she retired in 2001. She chaired the department of Near Eastern Languages three separate times – first in the 1970s, and twice in the 1990s.

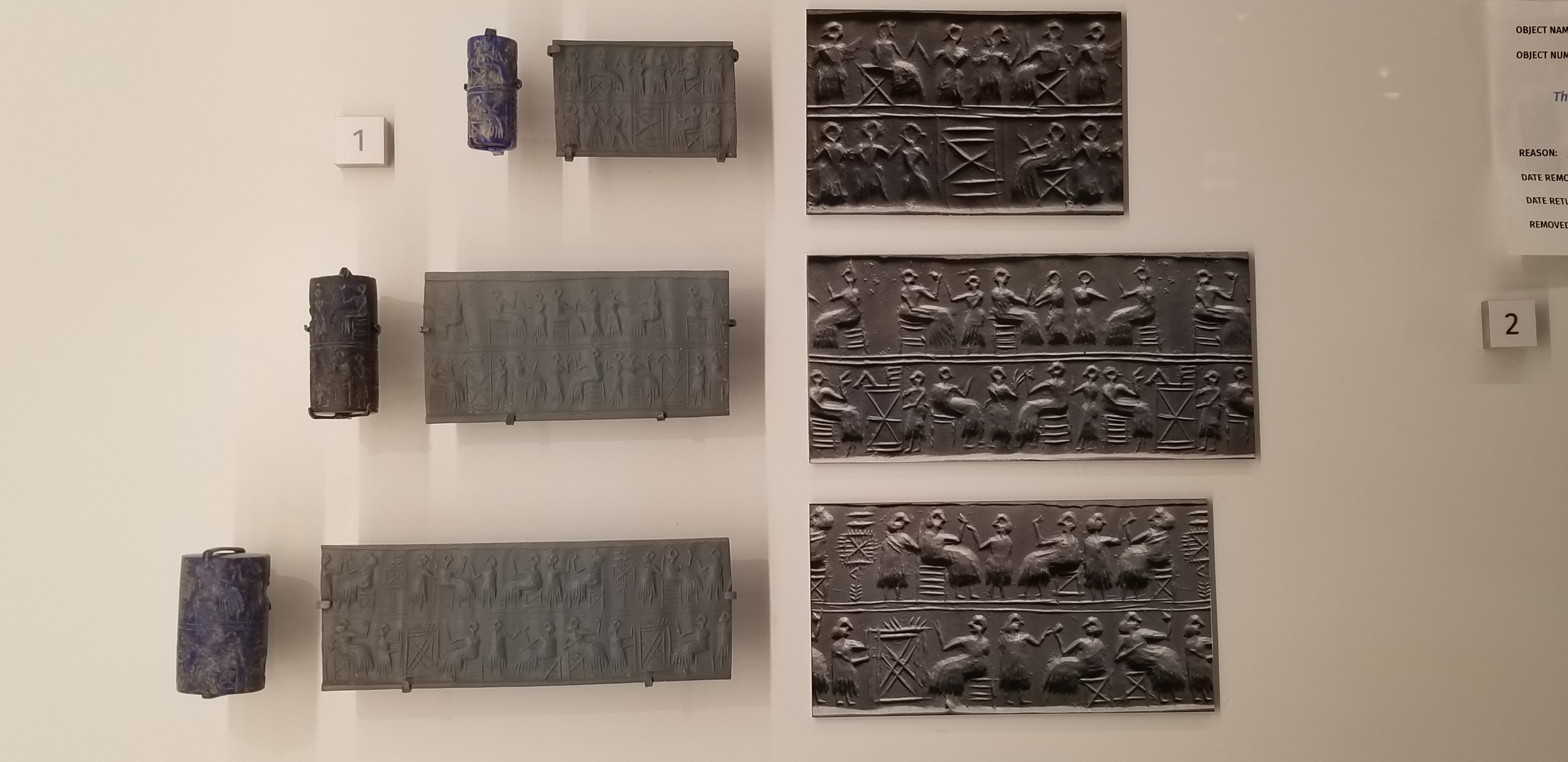
Ur (Mesopotamia), c. 2450 BCE, Cylinder seals showing banquet scenes with singing, eating, and dancing; Penn Museum (Philadelphia).

Anne Draffkorn Kilmer made many of her most important contributions to fields that she called “music archaeology” and “Mesopotamian music theory.” Kilmer is credited with deciphering the oldest known recorded piece of music, a 3,400 year old hymn from the Syrian city of Ugarit. This hymn addressed the moon goddess and asked for fertility and easy childbirth. She also published scholarship on ancient Mesopotamian mathematics and entertainment, with the latter developing from her musical expertise.
