= Shu-Sin =

Sumerian king, 20th-century BC

Shu-Sin 𒀭𒋗𒀭𒂗𒍪
- King of Sumer and Akkad; King of the Four Corners of the World
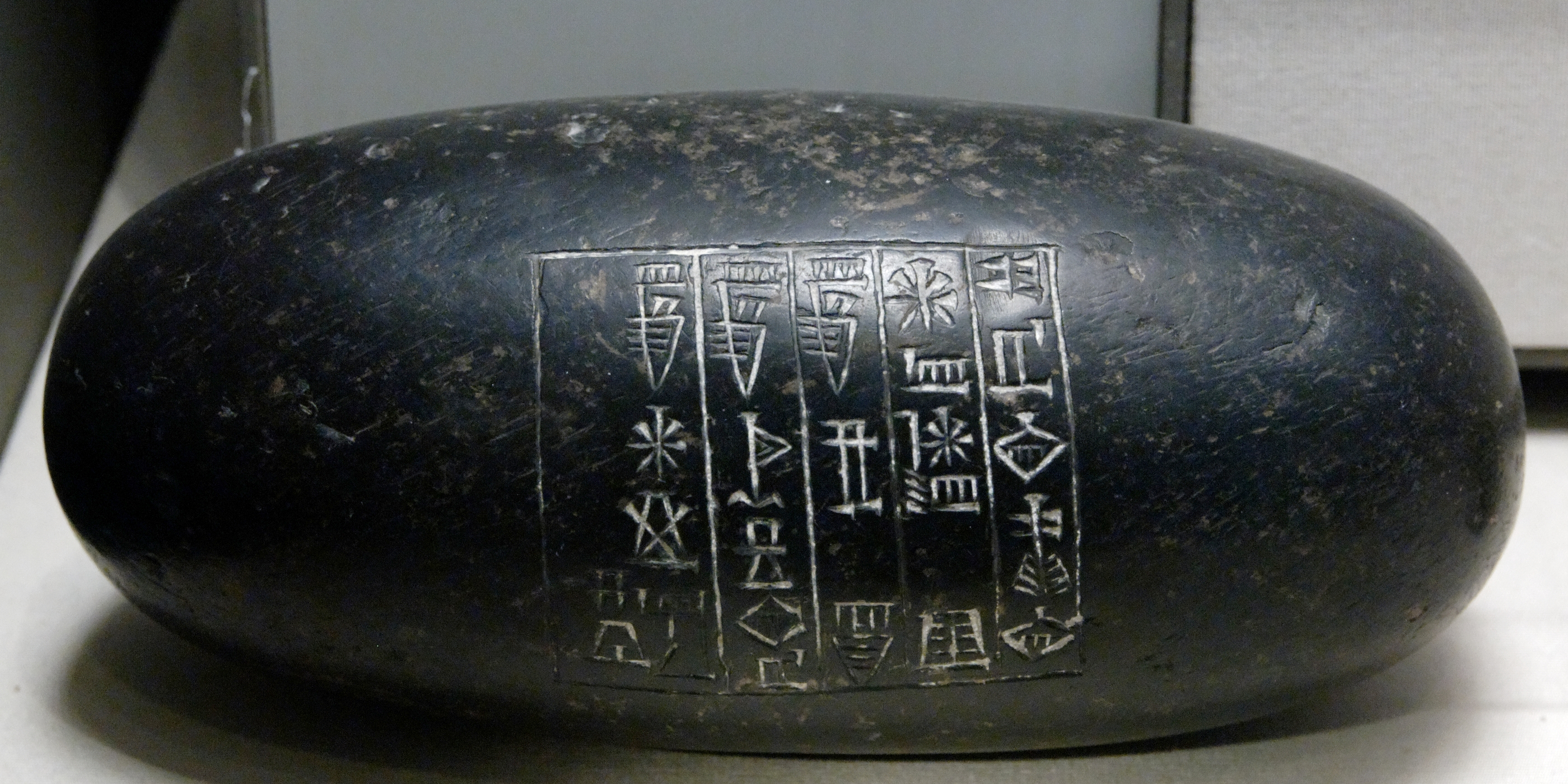
- 5-mina weight with the name of Shu-Sin, with his regnal titles, from Girsu, Louvre Museum

King of Ur
- Reign: c. 2037 – c. 2028 BC
- Predecessor: Amar-Sin
- Successor: Ibbi-Sin
- Died: c. 2028 BC
- Issue: Ibbi-Sin and 1 daughter
- Dynasty: 3rd Dynasty of Ur

Shu-Sin, also Šu-Suen (Akkadian: 𒀭𒋗𒀭𒂗𒍪: ^{D}Šu^{D}Sîn, after the Moon God Sîn", the "𒀭" being a silent honorific for "Divine", formerly read Gimil-Sin; died c. 2028 BC) was king of Sumer and Akkad, and was the fourth king of the Ur III dynasty. He succeeded Amar-Sin, who might have been his father, and reigned c. 2037 – c. 2028 BC (Middle Chronology).

== Crown Prince ==
As Crown Prince, Shu-Sin held the position at Der. However, when his father conducted a long military campaign against Huhnuri, Shu-Sin returned to hold Ur.

== Reign ==
Following an open revolt of his Amorite subjects, he directed the construction of a fortified wall between the Euphrates and the Tigris rivers in his fourth year, intending it to hold off any further Amorite attacks. He was succeeded by his son Ibbi-Sin.

An erotic poem addressed to Shu-Sin by a female speaker is preserved in a cuneiform tablet called Istanbul 2461. The poem's speaker expresses her strong desires and longings for the king.

An inscription states that he gave his daughter in marriage to the ruler of Šimānum "His daughter was given as a bride to Simanum. Simanum, Habura, and the surrounding districts rebelled against the king, they chased his daughter away from her residence." Shu-Sin subsequently conquered Šimānum and restored his daughter there.

=== Year names of Shu-sin ===
The year names for the reign of Shu-sin are all known and give an information about the events of his reign. The most important ones are:

1 Year Szu-Sin became king
2 Year Szu-Sin the king of Ur made / caulked the boat of Enki (called the) 'ibex of the abzu'
3 Year Szu-Sin the king of Ur destroyed Simanum
4 Year Szu-Sin the king of Ur built the amurru wall (called) 'muriq-tidnim / holding back the Tidanum'
6 Year Szu-Sin the king of Ur erected a magnificent stele for Enlil and Ninlil
7 Year Szu-Sin, the king of Ur, king of the four quarters, destroyed the land of Zabszali
9 Year Szu-Sin the king of Ur built the temple of Szara in Umma

== Artifacts ==
There is vast number of artifacts with inscriptions in the name of Shu-sin.

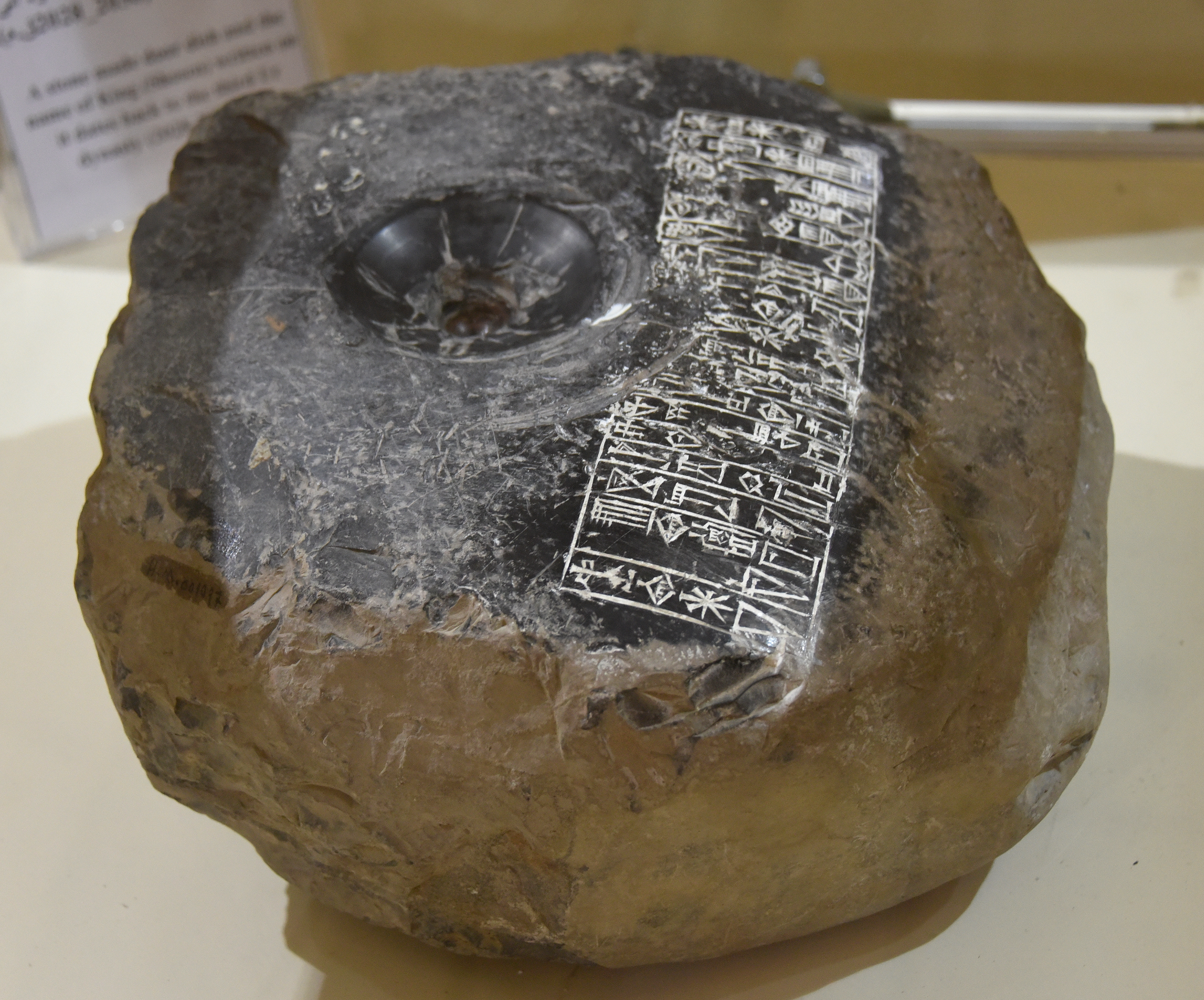
Door socket inscribed with the name of Shu-Sin, king of Ur, Ur III. From Mesopotamia, Erbil Civilization Museum.

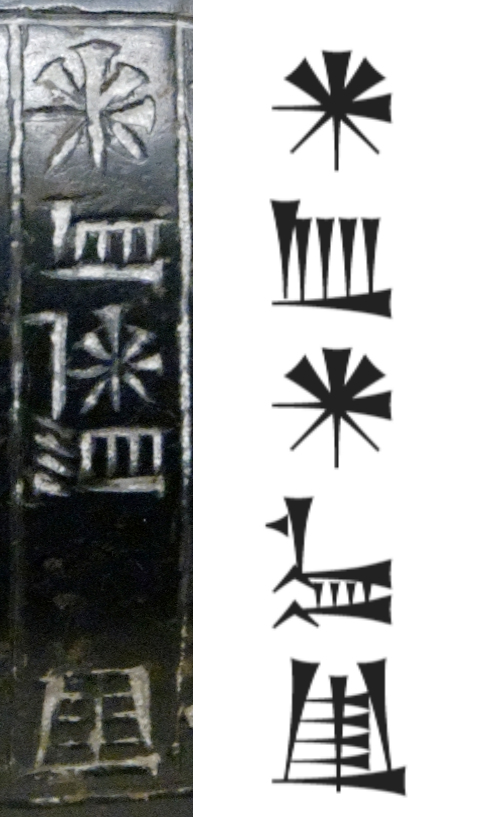
Inscription with the name of Shu-Sin

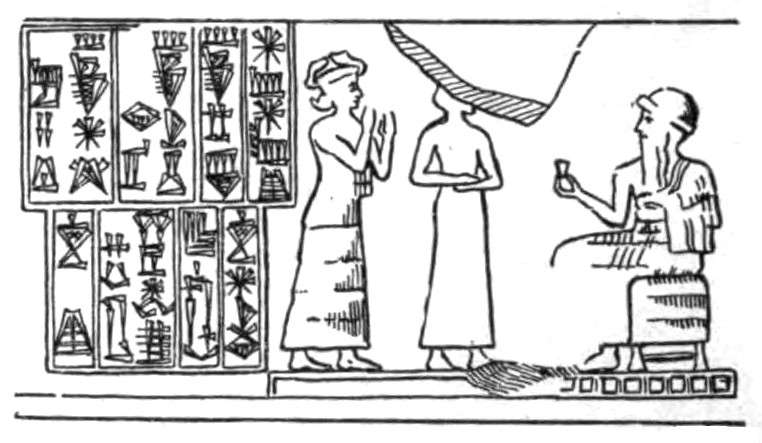
Seal of Shu-Sin: "Shu-sin, the Great King, King of Ur, King of the four world quarters..."

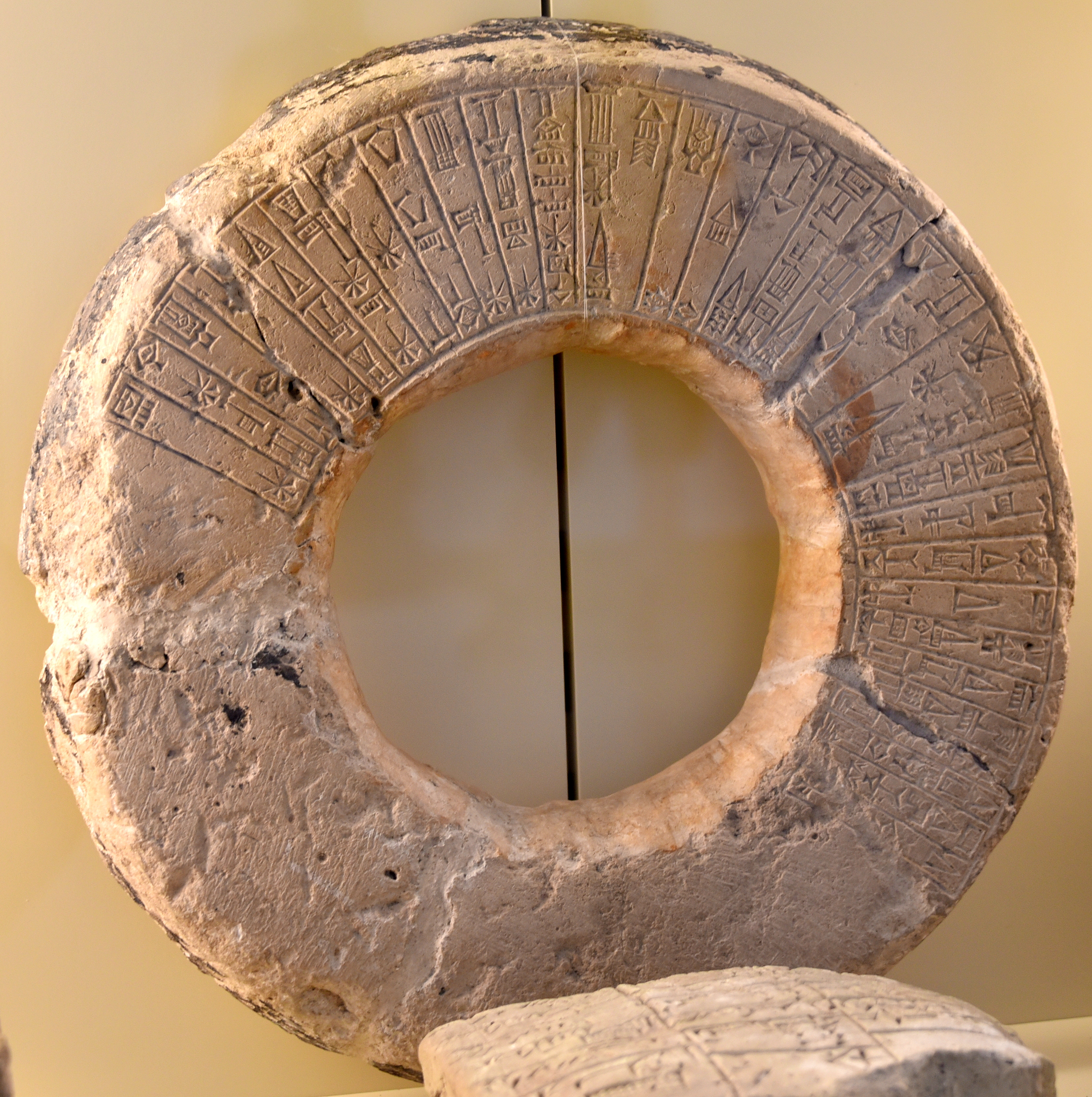
Inscribed stone ring of a fountain, in the name of king Shu-Sin. Pergamon Museum.

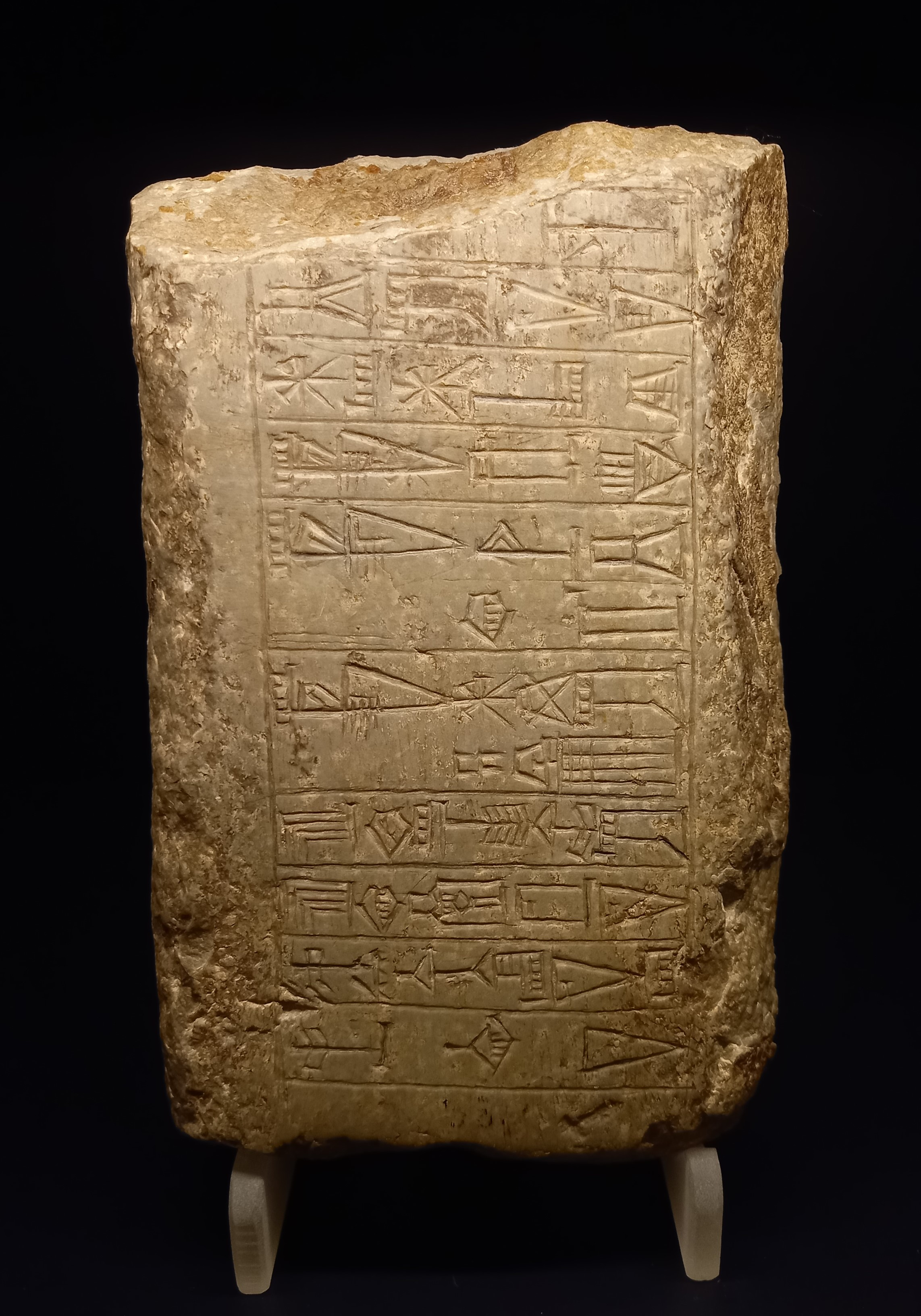
Inscription of King Shu-Sîn, commemorating the construction of the temple of the god Shara at Umma. Musée national d'histoire et d'art, Luxembourg, Cabinet des Médailles.

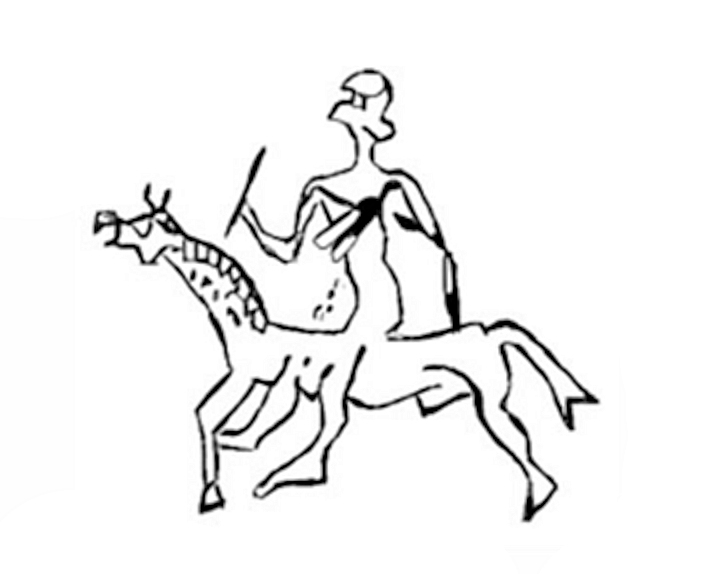
Seal of Abbakalla of Ur, riding a horse (reign of Shu-Sin, UR III, c. 2037 – c. 2028 BC), one of the first known such depiction

== See also ==
- A Love Song of Shu-Sin (B)
- History of Sumer
- Sumerian king list

Regnal titles
Preceded by Amar-Sin	King of Ur c. 2037 - c. 2028 BC	Succeeded by Ibbi-Sin
