= Šimānum =

Ancient Mesopotamian city

Šimānum (also Simanum) was an ancient Near East city-state whose location is not yet known. Its areal location is known to be in the northernmost part of Mesopotamia or the southernmost part of Anatolia, in the vicinity of the Tigris river, north of the Upper Zab river, and near the confluence of the Tigris and eastern Habur river (often confused with the western Habur river off the Euphrates). It is well documented during the time of the Ur III Empire in the late 3rd Millennium BC. It has been proposed that Šimānum was known, under different names, in other periods. If those proposals are correct the site was active from the Akkadian Empire period though the Old Babylonian period. Šimānum is also the name of an Old Babylonian month.

== History ==
The first ruler of Ur III, Shulgi, conducted a number of military campaigns in the northeast region of the empire around Šimānum. Šimānum itself appears to have been a vassal rather than a tributary state. Records, in Shugi year 45 and Amar-Sin year 6, report bears being sent to Ur by the ruler of Simanium.

Late in the reign of Shulgi (c. 2094–2046 BC), continuing into the reign of the Amar-Sin (c. 2046–2037 BC), the daughter of Shu-Sin, Kunši-matum (Submit, O land!) was given to the son of the then ruler of Simanum, Pušam/Bušam, in marriage. Pušam is noted, as ruler of Šimānum, in various Ur III records from the 2nd year of Amar-Sin until the 1st year of Shu-Sin. Pušam is also known from a seal found at Urkesh. In the first year of Shu-Sin Kunši-matum is recorded as being the bride (wife of the ruler) of Arib-atal of Šimānum. Arib-atal was the son of Pušam and brother of Ipḫuḫa. Ipḫuḫa later became ensi of Šimānum, noted in a text from the 1st year of Ibbi-Sin. Arib-atal was denoted as being the "man" of Šimānum. There is some debate on the status of Pušam and Arib-atal, ranging from ensi (governor) under Ur to vassal to ruler of an independent though strongly allied state.

In the second year of his reign, Ur III ruler Shu-Sin (c. 2037–2028 BC) launched an attack on polities to the north, including Simanum, Habura, and Mardaman.

"... (Sü-Sín)..., [the fl]ood which overwhelms the disobedient king (and) the rebel land, whose orders make the foreign country tremble, whose strength is outstanding his daughter was given as a bride to Simànum [Simanu]m, [Habur]a, (and) [the surrounding districts, rebelled against the king]. They ch[as]ed his [daughter] away from [her] residence. ... He smote the heads of Simânum, Habura, and the surrounding districts. He returned his daughter to her residence. He assigned to her service Simânum, Habüra, and the surrounding districts. He settled the enemy people, his booty, (namely) Simânum, for the god Enlil and the goddess Ninlil, on the frontier of Nippur, (and) built for them [a town]. He set (them) apart for them (Enlil andNinlil). The god of their town was Sü-Sín. ..."

Royal inscriptions record that this attack resulted from the royal family of Šimānum, allied to and intermarried with Ur, being overthrown. Success was reported to the capitol and a reward "for the messenger Lugal-sisa who brought the good news of the defeat of Simanum". This attack was marked in two of his year names (SS3 and SS4).

- mu ^{D}szu-^{D}en.zu lugal ur_{2}i^{ki}-ma-ke_{4} si-ma-num_{2}^{ki} mu-hul - Year Shu-Sin the king of Ur destroyed Šimānum
- mu us_{2}-sa ^{D}szu-^{D}en.zu lugal ur2i^{ki}-ma-ke_{4} si-ma-num_{2}^{ki} mu-hul - Year after the year Shu-Sin the king of Ur destroyed Šimānum

The later year name was only used for the early part of the year before being superseded. One record reports that daughter Kunši-matum was restored to the throne of Šimānum after the successful attack. In any event, correspondence between Ur and Šimānum continue until the early part of the reign of Ibbi-Sin (c. 2028–2004 BC).

Ur III ruler Shu-Sin, after destroying Šimānum settled the prisoners of that war in a town he founded near Nippur that he called Šimānum (sometimes called E-Šu-Suen). This practice for disposition of prisoners continued into the first millennium. Texts from Drehem, near Nippur, record a number of cases of "individuals of " being used as guarded workers, some of them acquired for a price. A tablet from Irisaĝrig dated to the 5th year of Shu-Sin recorded rations going to "ĝuruš from Simanum".

Early during the reign of the next, and last, Ur III ruler, Ibbi-Sin, Ur lost control of the Nippur area and the last record from this prisoner town is dated to the 4th year of Ibbi-Sin.

=== Ašimānum/Asimānum ===
Asimānum is known from the Akkadian Empire period and is typically assumed to be Šimānum. A fragmentary text of ruler Naram-Sin reports

"... He (Naram-Sin, went) from Asimanum to Sisil. At Sisil he crossed the Tigris River and (went) from Sisil to the side of the Euphrates River. He crossed the Euphrates River and (went) to Basar, the Amorite mountain. ..."

=== Šināmum ===
The poorly attributed Šināmum (also Šinamu), now thought to be at Üçtepe Höyük, active during the Old Babylonian period, has been pointed to as possibly being Šimānum i.e. "Although it seems probable that Ur III Shimanum, Old Assyrian Shimala, Old Babylonian Shinamum and Neo-Assyrian Sinabu are one and the same place" though this has now lost favor. One of the few textual references was found at Tell Shemshara.

"... Another matter: the lands of Šinamum and Tušḫum are on a par with Elaḫut itself; but there is no prince (madārum) guiding it, so they are looking to Elaḫut for leadership. If my lord would order it, my messengers should keep on going to these people, so that with 20 manas of silver I could bribe them and make them the enemy of the ruler of Elaḫut in a very short time. ..."

=== Šibaniba/Šibānum ===
It has been proposed that Šibaniba (Šibanibe in the Neo-Assyrian period), known in the Middle Assyrian period and thought to be at the site of Tell Billa, was earlier known as Šimānum though scant Ur III or Akkadian Empire period remains were known from there, the excavations being thinly published, and the areal location is not favorable.

== Location ==
While the rough areal location of Šimānum is known and a number of sites have been proposed all that is known about its specific location is that it was very near the 3rd millennium BC city of Habüra which was in turn near to the city of Maridaman (usually assumed to be the Middle Assyrian period Mardaman).

=== Near Habura ===
Šimānum is known to be near the city Ur III period city of Habüra (Ha-bu-ra^{ki}) which lay on the Habur river a tributary of the Tigris river (not to be confused with the western Habur river, off the Euphrates), at or near this confluence. In one text it is called "apqum sa Habür" (source of the Habür). In particular the large site of Basorin Tepe (also Basorin Hoyuk) has been proposed. Basorin has also been proposed as the site of Kipšūnu and of Šabīrēšu. Shamsi-Adad I, Amorite ruler of Ekallatum and later the Kingdom of Upper Mesopotamia, campaigned against a city of Haburâtum, generally thought to be Habüra. Haburâtum is also known from Mari texts and was near to Razama and Burullu. The location of Haburâtum was near the Habur, off the Tigris. It has also been speculated that the god Ḫabūrītum was from the city of Habüra. In a text of Samsi-Addu found at Tell Shemshara it states

"... As to Kušiya, why does he remain there? Give him instruction and send him to me by the [x] day of the month, before your mountains and roads get icy: From Zasli to Šegibbu; from Šegibbu to Zikum; from Zikum to Uraʾu; from Uraʾu to Lutpiš; from Lutpiš to the land of Ḫaburatum. Now, if otherwise, because your mountains and roads are already icy so that he cannot travel, let him stay with you. Make it your responsibility to provide him and his servants food and drink (“bread and beer”). Do release the people of the bearer of this tablet of mine."

=== Near Mardaman ===
The linkage with Mardaman (presumed to be Maridaman) is based on its listing with Habura in a later Shu-Sin military campaign primarily against Simaski.

"(As for) the [pe]ople of Ha[bura] and [Maridaman, Sü-Sín, [ki]ng of the black-headed people, raised servitude for them (and) co[vered] (them with it) as with a garment. In order to mine silver (and) gold he set them (to work there (in Zabasali) from there (Bulma)."

A location for Mardaman north of the modern city of Mardin in the Cizre region of Anatolia early on proposed based on the similarity in names but has since been discounted. More recently, the site of Bassetki has become generally accepted based on tablet found there in 2017.

=== Other proposals ===
Assuming the correspondence to Asimānum is correct, the location is thought to be near to the cities of Sisil and Talmuš, also unlocated (Gir-e Pān is proposed for Talmus).

Sinan on the confluence of Batman River and Tigris near the present Bismil in Turkey has been proposed.

A location in the "vicinity of Assur" has been proposed. A related suggestion was "north of Nineveh".

At one time Tell Hamoukar was suggested based on its size and location.

A recent proposal, based on the location and the similarity of names Šibaniba and Šimānum, is the site of Tell Billa

== See also ==
- Cities of the Ancient Near East
