= Balbale =

Sumerian form of poem

Balbale (from Sumerian bal "change") is a Sumerian form of poem, a kind of changing songs. Most of Tammuz and Enkimdu (an adamanduga) consists of changes like this. There’s a reference to balbale in the colophon of the poem, though it also may refer to the dialogue form of the writing. All hymns signed as balbales (Hymns to Ninurta, Hymns for Shu-Sin) contain changing repetitions. It is the most important feature of balbale. Dialogues referred to as balbale also consist of changing and unchanged periods.

In modern times, it is difficult to discern unifying characteristics of the ancient compositions labeled balbale.

== Sources ==
- (in Hungarian) Világirodalmi lexikon I. kötet, A-Cal, ISBN 963-05-4399-0
