= Theophile Meek =

A scholar at the University of Toronto, Theophile James Meek (1881–1966) published widely on archaeology, corresponded with Wm. F. Albright, and was a frequent contributor to the Encyclopædia Britannica on subjects related to the archaeology of both Palestine and Egypt. He may have played a part in working out the chronology of Egypt which soon became the prevailing mainstream chronology among scholars, and which the Encyclopedia Americana still upholds today. More recently, the Britannica has lowered its dates somewhat currently, with Manfred Bietak, an eminent Egyptologist placing them even later.

In the 1920s, Meek translated the Pentateuch, Joshua, Judges, Ruth, the Song of Songs, and Lamentations as part of a team working on The Bible: An American Translation.

In the book Hebrew Origins, he suggested that the Conquest of Palestine occurred in two phases: the first being represented by the settlement of the central highlands seen at 1400 BCE, and the second being seen archaeologically in the conquests of the "Joshua" cities, then dated to around 1250. He pointed out that the Song of Deborah (Judges ch. 5) does not seem to know the three Judah territory tribes, but early stages of Joshua do, and that they were thus perhaps transposed in time.

He is also widely cited for having suggested that the "Song of Songs" (a.k.a. the "Song of Solomon") had striking similarities with a Babylonian fertility myth.
