= Robert H. Pfeiffer =

US professor, museum curator, and Assyriologist

Robert Henry Pfeiffer (1892–1958) was a professor, museum curator, and Assyriologist. After serving as a Methodist pastor from 1916 to 1919 in Sanborn, New York, Pfeiffer taught at Harvard University beginning in 1922. He earned his M.A. in 1920 and Ph.D. in 1922 and, the following year, he also earned a Master of Sacred Theology (S.T.M.) from Harvard. He directed the Harvard-Baghdad School excavations at Nuzi, Iraq (from 1928). In 1930, he was appointed as an assistant professor. He also served as a professor at the School of Theology of Boston University. From 1931, he served as curator of the Harvard Semitic Museum.

== Career ==
He was named to the Hancock Professor of Hebrew and Other Oriental languages in 1953, announced by the provost Paul H. Buck. He held this chair from 1953–58.

== Death ==
In January of 1958, he died during his thirty-seventh year of teaching at Harvard University. He was buried at Mount Auburn Cemetery in Cambridge, Middlesex County, Massachusetts.

== Contributions to Assyriology ==
Pfeiffer's works include The Archives of Shilwateshub (1932); Excavations at Nuzi, volumes 2 (1933) and 4 (with E.R. Lacheman, 1942); One Hundred New Selected Nuzi Texts (with E.A. Speiser, 1936); and State Letters of Assyria (1935).

Pfeiffer wrote a number of papers on philological, literary, and historical-critical criticism of the Bible. He was editor of the Journal of Biblical Literature, 1943–47.
