= Nuzi (disambiguation) =

Nuzi was an ancient Mesopotamian city.

Nuzi may also refer to:

- Allegretto Nuzi (1315–1373), Italian painter
- Nuzi texts, ancient documents found during an excavation of Nuzi
- Nuzi ware, type of a ceramic ware named after the city
- Variant of Nuzzi
- Nuzi, a ship in Murder Drones
