= Šeri and Ḫurri =

Pair of divine bulls in Hurrian mythology

- Pair of divine bulls
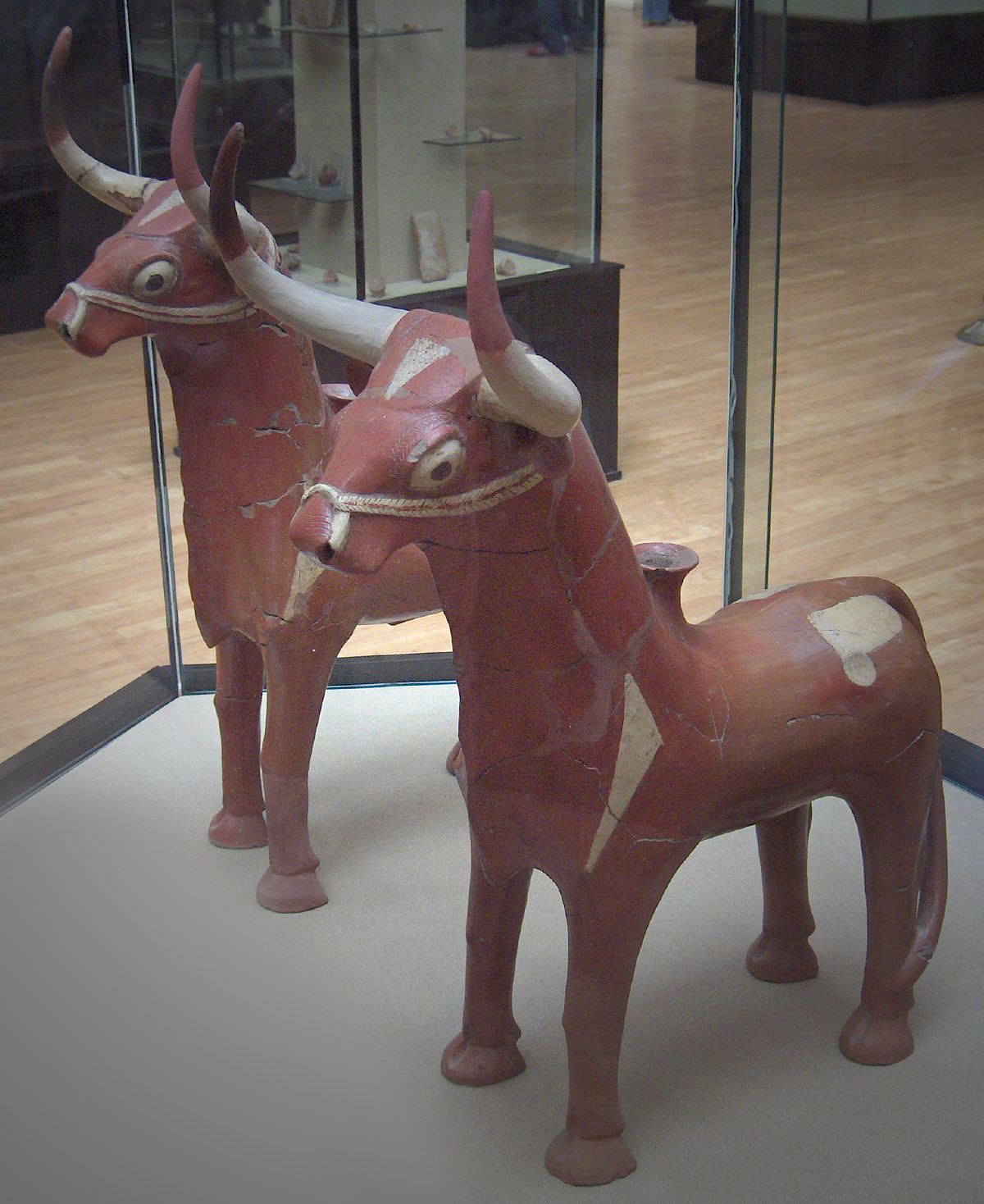
- 16th century BCE ceremonial vessel in the shape of Šeri and Ḫurri at the Museum of Anatolian Civilizations
- Affiliation: Court of Teššub
- Major cult center: Nuzi, Šapinuwa. Assur
- Ethnic group: Hurrians, Hittites, Mesopotamians

Šeri and Ḫurri were a pair of theriomorphic Hurrian gods who almost always appear together in known sources. They were believed to pull the chariot of Teššub, the Hurrian weather god. Šeri additionally could function as a deity mediating between petitioners and his master, but no individual role was ever assigned to Ḫurri. In addition to appearing in Hurrian offering lists and theophoric names, for example from Nuzi, Šeri and Ḫurri are also attested in Hittite and Mesopotamian sources. While the Hittites incorporated them into their pantheon alongside Teššub and other deities from his circle, in Mesopotamia they instead came to be associated with Adad.

== Names ==
Šeri and Ḫurri almost always occur as a pair in known texts. In oldest sources, the spellings of the names were Šēriš (or Šerriš) and Ḫurra, but later the forms Šeri (Šerri) and Ḫurri predominate. In Emar, the forms Hurraš and Šeliš are attested. A number of unique variants have also been identified in Neo-Assyrian sources, for example Ermiš and Ḫurmiš. While accepted in early scholarship, the view that an Ugaritic form of Šeri's name (written as ṯr in the local alphabetic script) is also attested is now agreed to be a mistake caused by incorrect reading of the word šarri. In standard syllabic cuneiform both names could be written with one of two determinatives, dingir or gud.

It has been proposed that the names of Šeri and Ḫurri might be translated as, respectively, "morning"/"day" and "evening"/"night". Volkert Haas instead etymologized them as "guardian of the throne" (from Hurrian šerše, "throne") and "irrigator" (through analogy with Urartian ḫurrišḫe). However, so far no proposal found universal acceptance.

== Character and iconography ==
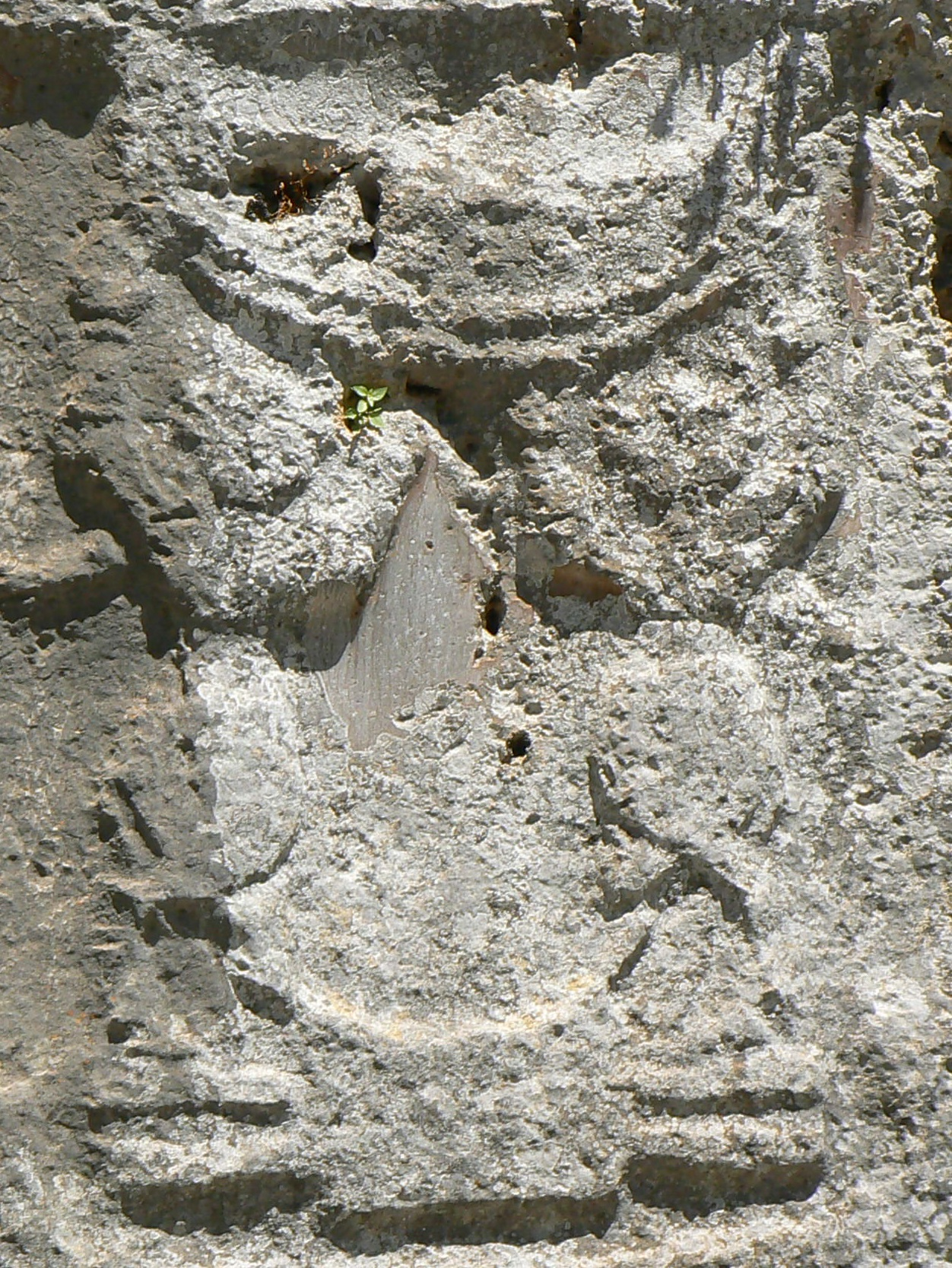
Bull men from Yazılıkaya

Šeri and Ḫurri were regarded as benevolent deities, and in a single text they are jointly referred to with the epithet šinurḫina, "the two righteous ones". A lexical list from Emar equates this term with the Sumerian word maštabba, "twins", which was used to designate pairs of apotropaic figures. Šeri is also at times attested on his own as a deity capable of mediating between petitioners and his master, but no known sources assign any individual characteristics to Ḫurri.

In known texts Šeri and Ḫurri are consistently described as theriomorphic. They were regarded as the divine bulls of Teššub, the Hurrian weather god. They were believed to pull his chariot. According to Alfonso Archi, the first references to two bulls drawing the chariot of a weather god come from texts from Ebla, and it is possible Šeri and Ḫurri were only the Hurrian names of preexisting figures from the circle of Hadda of Halab attested in this text corpus. Depictions of a weather god in a chariot drawn by two bulls are well attested in art of both northern Syria and Anatolia. In Yazılıkaya, Šeri and Ḫurri might be depicted next to Teššub and his family (Ḫepat, Šarruma, Allanzu and Kunzišalli), though this conclusion is not universally accepted. It is also sometimes argued that two bull-like figures from this site (reliefs 28 and 29) represent them, but due to their partially anthropomorphic appearance this is not regarded as a plausible interpretation. Piotr Taracha instead labels them as “bull-men standing on a symbol of the Earth and supporting a symbol of Heaven”. Frans Wiggermann interprets these figures as an adaptation of Mesopotamian kusarikku, and similarly concludes they are simply meant to support earth and heaven. Possible depictions of Šeri and Ḫurri have also been identified on an orthostat relief from Malatya and on the golden bowl of Hasanlu.

== Worship ==
Šeri and Ḫurri commonly appear in Hurrian religious texts, such as offering lists and oaths. In the former, they are typically followed by Ḫazzi and Namni, two mountain gods also counted among the members of Teššub's entourage. References to songs sung in their honor are also known. Oldest theophoric names invoking Šeri are known from Upper Mesopotamia from the Old Babylonian period. One example is Šeriš-adal ("Šeri is strong"). Ḫurri (spelled in this context as Ḫurra) appears as an element in theophoric names from Nuzi, though only uncommonly, and Šeri occurs more frequently in this text corpus.

=== Hittite reception ===
Šeri and Ḫurri were incorporated into the pantheon of the Hittite Empire alongside Teššub and other members of his circle. They appear in Hurrian context in texts from Hattusa. In a prayer of Muwatalli II (CTH 381), Šeri acts as a mediator on behalf of the king in front of the divine assembly. In other texts both bulls accompany kings in battle, and they might have functioned as royal tutelary deities in Hittite culture. They also appear as a pair in kaluti (Hurrian offering lists) from Šapinuwa. The text KUB 7.60 contains a curse formula in which a city of the enemy is turned into a pasture for Šeri and Ḫurri upon which they will eternally graze to prevent rebuilding.

A ritual text from Emar which mentions Šeri and Ḫurri alongside deities such as Allani, Mušītu (deified night), Ḫazzi and Namni, while written in the local dialect of Akkadian, is presumed to be based on a Hurro-Hittite original.

=== Mesopotamian reception ===
In Both Babylonia and Assyria, Šeri and Ḫurri came to be incorporated into the Mesopotamian pantheon. According to Daniel Schwemer, in the latter area this phenomenon can be considered a relic of a period of Hurrian (specifically Mitanni) rule over Assyrian territory. Beate Pongratz-Leisten credits Adad-nirari I with their formal introduction to the state pantheon of the Assyrian state. They first appear in a coronation ritual from the Middle Assyrian period, and later among the deities worshiped in the temple of Adad in Assur listed in the Tākultu texts and other sources. According to Daisuke Shibata, Šeri might also be present in a copy of the Weidner god list from Tell Taban in which four entries are represented by the logogram ^{d}GU_{4}, which according to his interpretation likely designates various bull gods.

In Babylonia, Šeri appears in Akkadian theophoric names from the Middle Babylonian period, such as Bāna-ša-Šēriš. He is also mentioned alongside Māgiru ("obedient") as one of the two bulls of Adad in the god list An = Anum (tablet III, lines 233–234), but according to Wilfred G. Lambert, the presence of the latter deity in place of Ḫurri is unusual, and elsewhere in the same list this deity instead occurs as the "herald" (gu-za-lá) of Akkil, the temple of Ninshubur (tablet I, line 255). Daniel Schwemer considers this entry to be a possible scribal mistake, and similarly notes Ḫurri in theory would be expected to appear after Šeri.

Volkert Haas interpreted the deity Šerum as an Akkadianized form of Šeri, but according to Daniel Schwemer these two theonyms are not related to each other.

Whether any connection existed between Šeri, Ḫurri or any other deities associated with Teššub (for example Tilla or Šarruma) and Būru, a divine bull calf attested as a subordinate of Adad in Aramaic sources from the Neo-Assyrian and Late Babylonian periods, remains unknown.

== Mythology ==
In the Kumarbi Cycle, a series of Hurrian myths known from Hittite translations, Šeri and Ḫurri appear as allies of Teššub. In the Song of Kumarbi, Šeri tells Teššub that he should abstain from cursing certain deities, with Ea being singled out. Due to incomplete preservation is not known whether this is because Ea is at this point in the story a neutral party who should not be antagonized, or because the bull sees him as a particularly dangerous opponent.

In the Song of Ullikummi, when Teššub decides to fight the eponymous stone giant, he orders his brother Tašmišu to anoint the horns of Šeri after bringing the bull from his pasture. The second bull is referred to as Tilla in this myth. Piotr Taracha assumes that this deity was a counterpart of Ḫurri in a tradition originating in the eastern part of the area inhabited by the Hurrians. However, Tilla is best attested as an independent god in texts from Nuzi, and there is no other evidence in favor of interpreting him as a divine bull.
