= Tilla (deity) =

Hurrian god

- Bull god
- Major cult center: Ulamme, Nuzi, Kuruḫanni

Tilla or Tella (^{d}til-la or ^{gud}ti-el-la) was a Hurrian god assumed to have the form of a bull. He is best attested in texts from Nuzi, where he commonly appears in theophoric names. His main cult center was Ulamme.

== Name and character ==
It has been proposed that Tilla's name was derived from a Hurrian word for bull, though this proposal remains unproven. He is nonetheless often characterized in modern literature as a "bull god". The only source which explicitly describes him as having the form of a bull is the Song of Ullikummi. In this composition, which is considered to belong to the cycle of myths about Kumarbi, Tilla is one of the two bulls who pull Teshub's chariot, the other one being Šerišu. During preparations for battle with the eponymous being, the stone giant Ullikummi, Teshub says Tilla's tail needs to be covered with gold.

In other sources, such as offering lists, Šerišu is paired with Hurriš, not Tilla. Piotr Taracha considers the pair Tilla and Šerišu to belong to eastern Hurrian tradition, and Šerišu and Hurriš to western. However, Daniel Schwemer notes that in the eastern Hurrian text corpus from Nuzi both Tilla and Hurriš are attested, and concludes that the exact relation between these two gods is unknown and it only can be determined that most likely neither was an epithet of the other. He proposes treating both of them, as well as Šerišu and Šarruma, as members of a category of bull deities linked with Teshub. He notes that bull-like deities were linked to weather gods across the entire ancient Near East starting in the beginning of the second millennium BCE, but the roots of this phenomenon are uncertain. He also states Tilla might not have initially belonged to the circle of Teshub, as sources from Nuzi treat him as an independent deity rather than as a divine draft animal of the weather god. Volkert Haas suggested that in this area Tilla's character was comparable to that of Teshub based on the fact that in religious texts he could be listed alongside Ishtar (or Šauška) bēlat dūri ("lady of the city wall"), which according to him might parallel the weather god's relation to Šauška.

== Worship ==
Tilla was worshiped in the kingdom of Arrapḫa, which was located in northern Mesopotamia on the eastern border of the Mitanni Empire. His cult center was Ulamme. He was seemingly the head of the pantheon of this city. A temple dedicated to him was located in this area. He is best attested in documents from Nuzi, where he is the most common deity in Hurrian theophoric names next to Teshub. Examples include Irir(i)-Tilla ("Tilla is the one who helps"), Kirip-Tilla ("Tilla frees"), Pašši-Tilla ("Tilla sent"), Šarri-Tilla ("Tilla is a divine king") and Urḫi-Tilla ("Tilla is reliable"). It is possible that in some cases theophoric names in which a theonym is abbreviated as Te, Tē, Teya or Tēya also refer to Tilla, as opposed to Teshub or Tirwe. References to an entu priestess connected to his cult are also known. She resided in Kuruḫanni (modern Tell al-Fakhar).

In the corpus of texts from Kassite Nippur, which constitutes the main source of attestations of Hurrian personal names from Babylonia from this period, four examples invoking Tilla occur. However, theophoric name Ur-Tilla known from both this city and Puzrish-Dagan from the Ur III period refers to another deity, seemingly worshiped in Umma, whose name is derived from the Sumerian word tillá (written AN.AŠ.AN or AN.DIŠ.AN), "street".

== Uncertain attestations ==
Volkert Haas proposed that the name of the Hurrian mountain Šenu-Tilla (or Šena-Tilla), which is mentioned in the texts pertaining to the ḫišuwa festival, references Tilla and can be translated as "the two Tilla". This possibility is also accepted by Daniel Schwemer, who notes that the mountain possibly named after Tilla is paired with another named Šēra, which he sees as a possible reflection of the pair Tilla and Šerišu attested in the Song of Ullikummi. However, he express doubts about Haas' translation of the mountain's name, as there is no indication that Tilla was ever regarded as a dyad of deities. Gernot Wilhelm considers the connection between the names of the mountain and the god uncertain.

A deity named ^{d}ti-la, who according to Wilfred G. Lambert might correspond to Tilla, is attested in a Mesopotamian god list which equates him with a Mesopotamian deity whose name is not preserved, possibly Adad or Ea. This text is only known from a single damaged tablet, VAT 10608 (KAR 339a), which was found in Assur and presently belongs to the collection of the Vorderasiatisches Museum Berlin. It seemingly originated in the Middle Babylonian period. Multiple of the deities listed in it are obscure or foreign, with examples including the primordial figure Lugaldukuga, the Elamite god Simut or Ḫillibe, presumably related to the homophonous word for god in an unknown language attested in a lexical list.
