= Nuzi texts =

Akkadian tablets

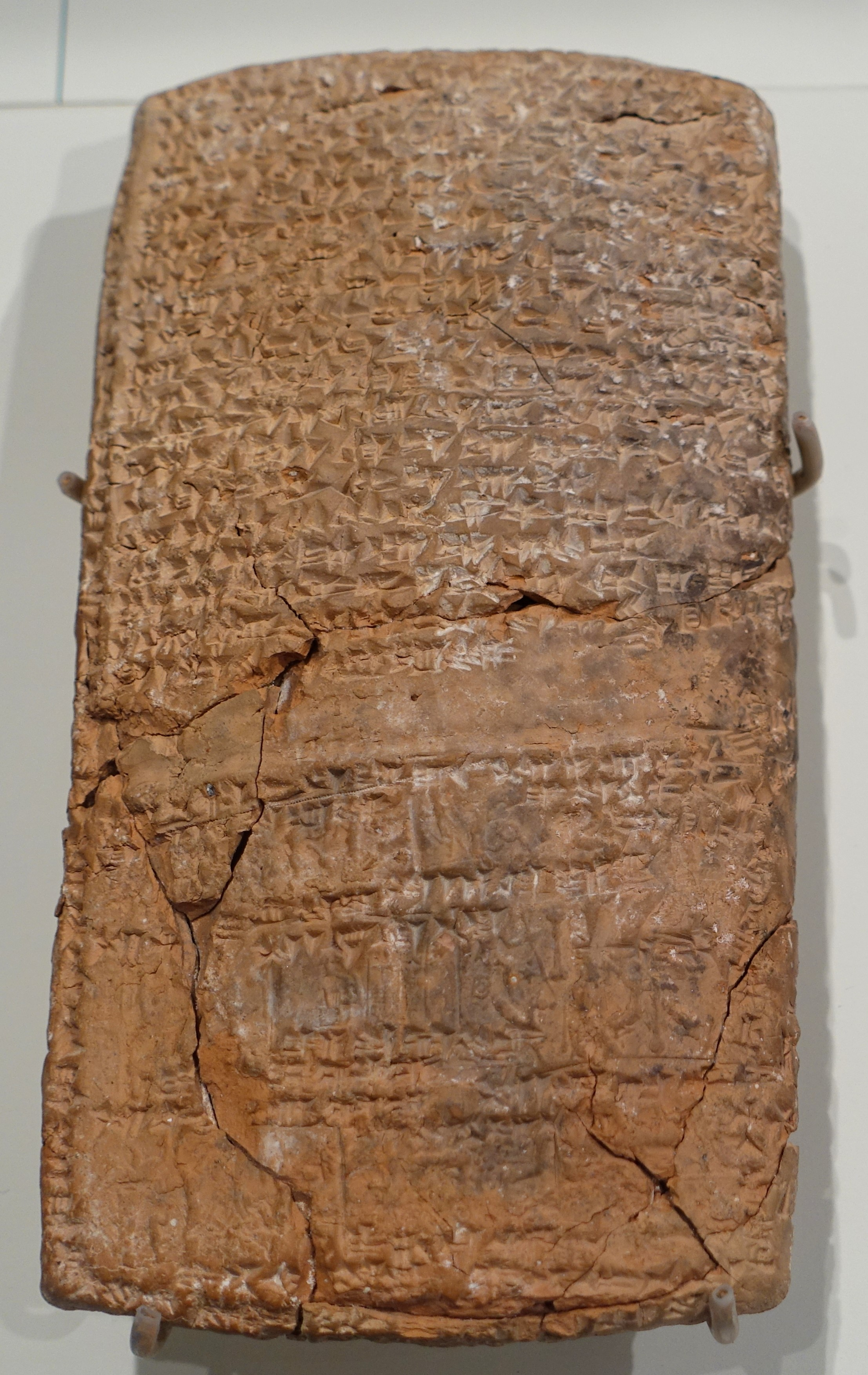
Legal dispute over land - Nuzi

The Nuzi texts are ancient documents found during an excavation of Nuzi, an ancient Mesopotamian city southwest of Kirkuk in modern Kirkuk Governorate of Iraq, located near the Tigris river. They were found on cuneiform tablets written in the Akkadian language. The site consists of one medium-sized multiperiod tell and two small single period mounds. The texts are mainly legal and business documents. They have previously been viewed as evidence for the age and veracity of certain parts of the Old Testament, especially of the Patriarchal age, but that attribution is now doubted by most scholars.

== Archeological site and tablets ==
Tablets from the site began appearing as early as 1896, but the first serious archaeological efforts only began in 1925 after Gertrude Bell noticed tablets appearing in the markets of Baghdad. The dig was mainly worked by Edward Chiera, Robert Pfeiffer, and Richard Starr under the auspices of the Iraq Museum and the Baghdad School of the American Schools of Oriental Research and later the Harvard University and Fogg Art Museum. Excavations continued through 1931. The site has 15 occupation levels. The hundreds of tablets and other finds recovered were published in a series of volumes. More finds continue to be published to this day.

To date, around 5000 tablets are known, mostly held at the Oriental Institute, the Harvard Semitic Museum and the Iraq Museum in Baghdad. Many are routine legal and business documents and about one quarter concern the business transactions of a single family. The vast majority of finds are from the Hurrian period during the second millennium BC with the remainder dating back to the town's founding during the Akkadian Empire. An archive contemporary to the Hurrian archive at Nuzi has been excavated from the "Green Palace" at the site of Tell al-Fakhar, 35 kilometres (22 mi) southwest of Nuzi. These tablets have been described as showing parallels between the Bible and Hurrian culture such as making a slave an heir and using a surrogate for a barren wife. Writing in The Oxford History of the Biblical World Wayne T. Pitard says "The appearance of Late Bronze Age parallels to certain marriage, inheritance, and family religious customs in Genesis cannot be used as evidence that such stories preserve ancient traditions of the second millennium, since most of these customs continued into the first millennium BCE when the Genesis narratives were written down. So the Nuzi texts have a limited, largely illustrative function."

== See also ==
- Book of Genesis
- List of artifacts in biblical archaeology

== Bibliography ==
- Nuzi Texts and Their Uses as Historical Evidence - By Maynard Paul Maidman - ISBN 1589832132
- A History of Israel - By John Bright - ISBN 9780664220686
