= Agriculture in Mesopotamia =

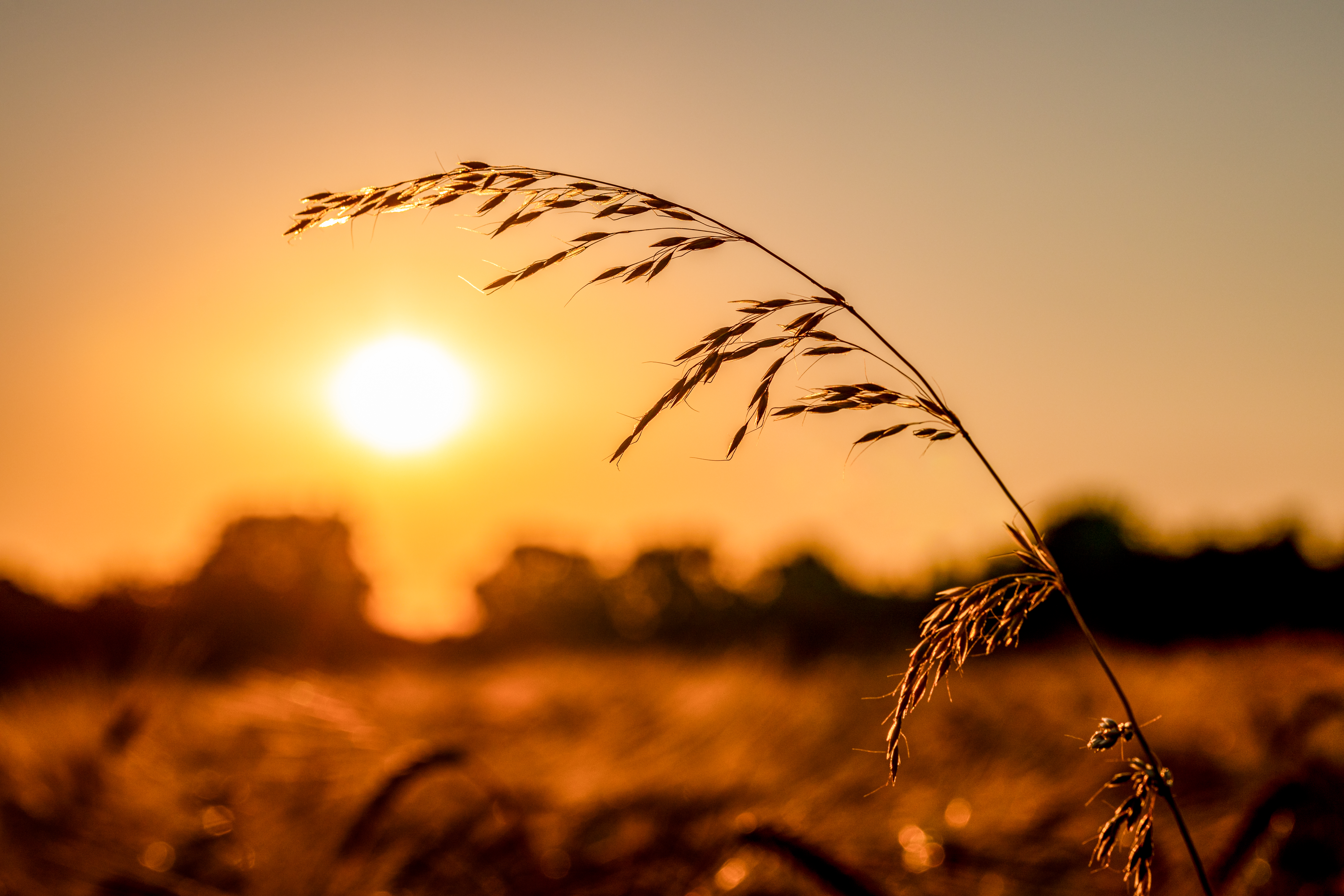
Barley, grown in a field

Agriculture was the main economic activity in ancient Mesopotamia. Operating under tough constraints, notably the arid climate, the Mesopotamian farmers developed effective strategies that enabled them to support the development of the first known empires, under the supervision of the institutions which dominated the economy: the royal and provincial palaces, the temples, and the domains of the elites. They focused above all on the cultivation of cereals (particularly barley) and sheep farming, but also farmed legumes, as well as date palms in the south and grapes in the north.

There were two types of Mesopotamian agriculture, corresponding to the two main ecological domains, which largely overlapped with cultural distinctions. Southern or Lower Mesopotamia, the land of Sumer and Akkad, which later became Babylonia received almost no rain and required large scale irrigation works which were supervised by temple estates, but could produce high returns. Northern or Upper Mesopotamia, the land that would eventually become Assyria, had enough rainfall to allow dry agriculture most of the time so that irrigation and large institutional estates were less important, but the returns were also usually lower.

== Climate ==
While developing models to describe the early development of settled agriculture in the Near East, reconstructions of climate and vegetation are a subject of consideration. During the glacial period, it is thought that lower temperatures or higher aridity resulted in sparse or non-existent forest cover similar to steppe type terrain in the area of the Zagros Mountains and varying forest cover in the territories of modern-day Turkey and Syria. Northwest Syria, dominated in ancient times by deciduous oak, is thought to have been less arid between 10,000 BCE and 7000 BCE than it is today. Scholars believe that wild cereal grasses probably spread with the forest cover, out from the glacial refugia westward into the Zagros.

== Topography ==
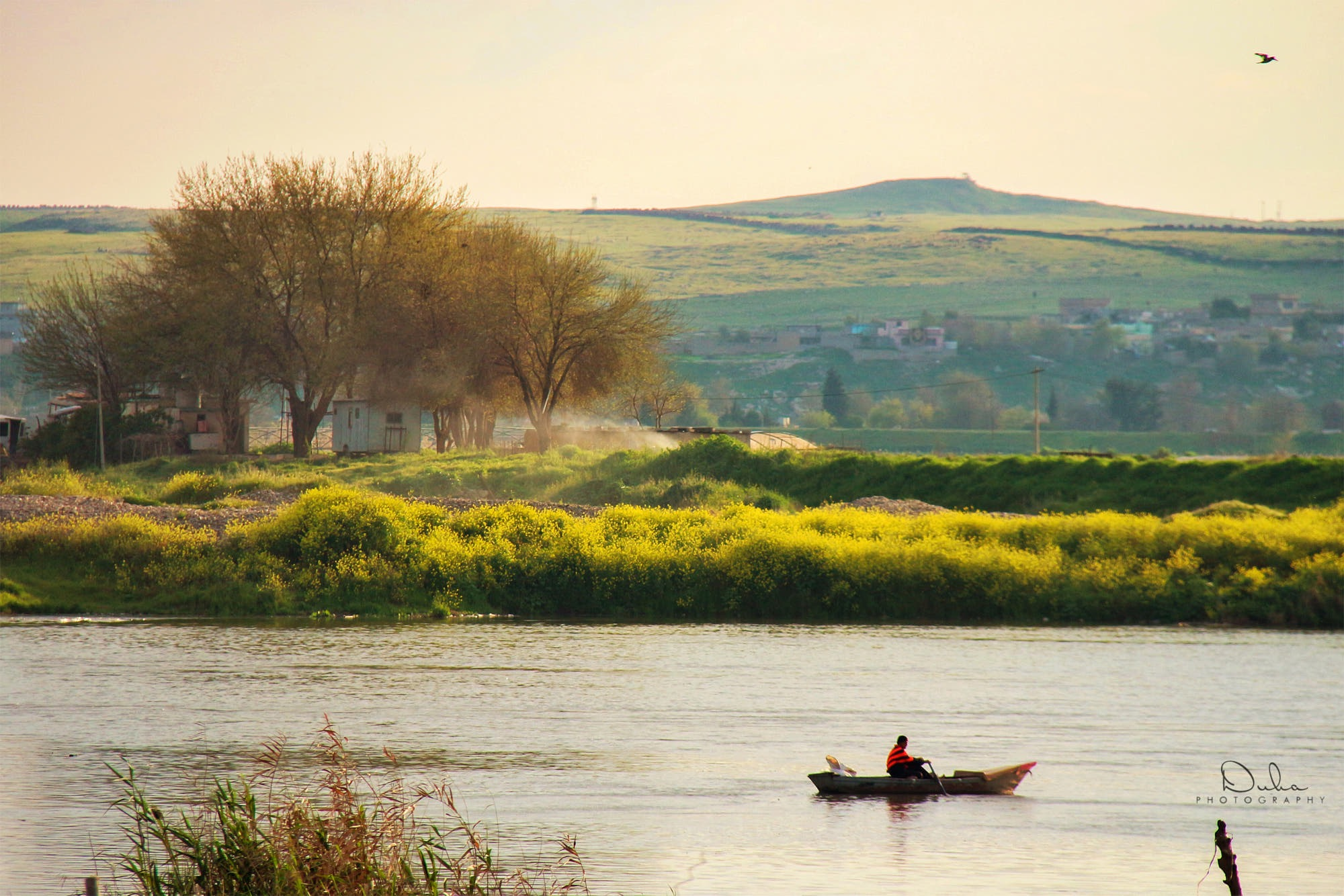
The Tigris flowing through the region of modern Mosul in Upper Mesopotamia.

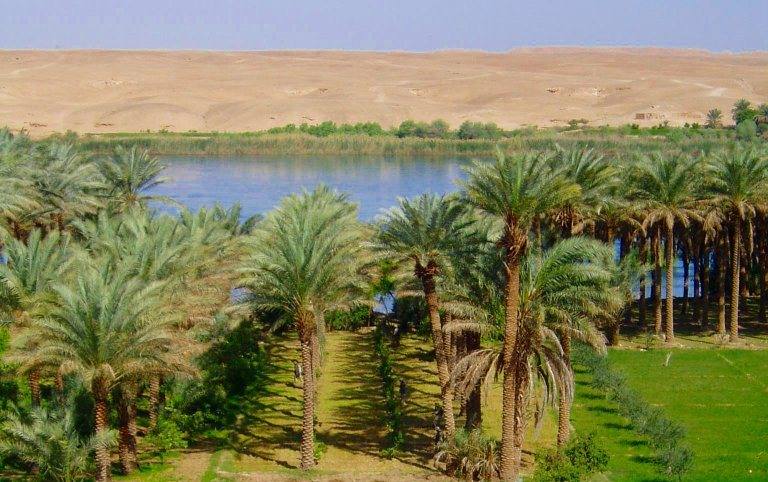
Palm orchard in the lower Euphrates valley.

The societies of ancient Mesopotamia developed one of the most prosperous agricultural systems of the ancient world, under harsh constraints: rivers whose patterns had little relation to the growth cycle of domesticated cereals; a hot, dry climate with brutal interannual variations; and generally thin and saline soil. Conditions in the north may have been more favourable because the soil was more fertile and the rainfall was high enough for agriculture without irrigation, but the scale of rivers in the south and the flat plains which made it easy to cut irrigation channels and put large areas under cultivation gave advantages to the development of irrigated farms which were productive but required constant labour.

The native wild grasses in this region were densely growing, highly productive species, especially the varieties of wild wheat and barley. These grasses and wild legumes like pea and lentil were used as food sources in the hunter-gatherer societies for millennia before settled agriculture was widespread.

=== Rivers ===
The two main watercourses of Mesopotamia, which give the region its name, are the Euphrates and the Tigris, which flow from Anatolia to the Persian Gulf. The Euphrates is around 2,800 km long and the Tigris is about 1,900 km. Their regime is of the pluvial-naval type, with high flow in spring as a result of melting snow and when rains fall in Upper Mesopotamia. This is more accentuated with the Tigris, which receives several tributaries from the Zagros during the second part of its course, while the Euphrates has only a minor tributary in Upper Mesopotamia. Thus its output is weaker, especially since it crosses flatter areas and has a wide bend in Syria which slows its flow. Floods of the rivers thus take place in spring—in April for the Tigris and in May for the Euphrates (shortly after or during the harvest). Their baseflow occurs in summer at the time of greatest heat, when evapotranspiration is very high, especially in the south. The variability of flow rate over the year is very great—up to 4:1. The discharge of the Euphrates and its floods were weaker than those of the Tigris, so it was on particularly on its banks that agricultural communities of southern Mesopotamia focused. In this region, the ground is very flat, leading to bifurcation, which results in islands and marshes, as well as sudden changes of course, which occurred several times in antiquity. Both rivers carry silt which raised them above the level of the surrounding plain, making it easy to irrigate the land surrounding them. However, it also meant that their floods had the potential to cause serious damage and could cover a vast area. The flatness of the region also meant that the phreatic zone and the stream bed were very close, causing them to rise in periods of flooding. In modern times, the Tigris and the Euphrates join to form the Shatt al-Arab which then debouches in the Persian Gulf, but in antiquity, their delta did not reach so far south, because it was created slowly by the deposition of alluvium.

Other watercourses in Mesopotamia are the rivers that flow into the Tigris and Euphrates. The tributaries of the former originate in the Zagros; from north to south they are the Great Zab, the Little Zab, and Diyala. Their courses have a rapid flow, on account of the steep relief and the gorges through which they flow, as well as the snowmelt in spring which leads to large floods in April/May. They carry a large amount of the alluvium which ends up in the Tigris. The Euphrates has two tributaries which meet it in southern Jazirah: the Balikh and the Khabur.

=== Relief ===
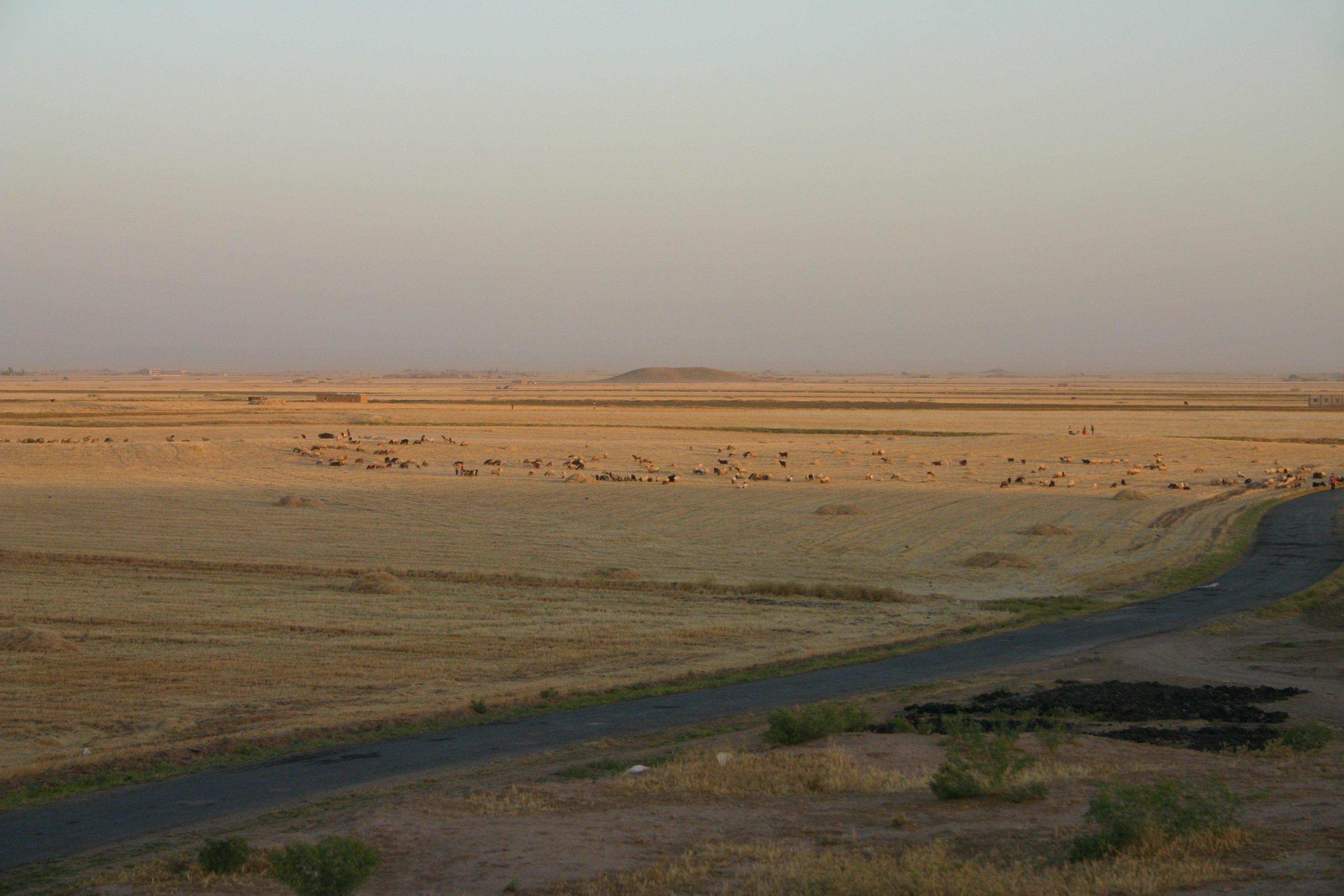
Typical view of farmland in the area north of Al-Hasakah, with an ancient tell visible on the horizon

The terrain of Mesopotamia is mostly flat, consisting of floodplains and plateaus. It is bordered by high mountains on the eastern side—the Zagros range, which is pierced by deep valleys and canyons with a northwest-southeast orientation (Great Zab, Little Zab, Diyala)—and by smaller mountains and volcanoes in Upper Mesopotamia (Kawkab, Tur Abdin, Jebel Abd-el-Aziz, Sinjar, Mount Kirkuk). Essentially, Upper Mesopotamia consists of plateaus which are slightly inclined to the east, rising from 200–500 m in altitude, and which are now known as Jazirah (from the Arabic, al-jazayra, 'the island'). Thus, the rivers flow through valleys which are 1–10 km wide. The southern half of Mesopotamia, which is the part properly called Mesopotamia from a geophysical point of view, since it is where the Tigris and Euphrates flow close to one another, is a vast plain, which is 150–200 km wide and has only a very slight incline, decreasing to the south until it is nearly non-existent. This encourages the development of river braiding, sudden changes of course, and the establishment of marshy areas.

=== Soil ===
The soil in Mesopotamia is mostly of the sort that is normal in arid climates: a shallow layer on top of the bedrock which is not very fertile. They are generally composed of limestone or gypsum with nutritive elements which enable plant growth, but have only a narrow layer in which the roots can grow. Deeper soil is found in the valleys and culverts of Upper Jazirah. In the more arid areas of Lower Jazirah and Lower Mesopotamia by contrast, the soil is generally sparse and very shallow (solonchak and fluvisol types) and mostly composed of gypsum. They degrade easily and irrigation accelerates both their erosion and their salinisation. However, the poverty and fragility of the soils of Southern Mesopotamia are largely compensated for by sheer area of flat land available for irrigation. In the north by contrast, there is better soil, but less land and there is more risk arising from the variation in precipitation.

== Human infrastructure ==
Mesopotamian farmers did a number of things in order to augment the land's potential and reduce its risks. The infrastructure that they created profoundly altered the land, particularly through the creation of irrigation networks in the south where the supply of water from the river was necessary for the growth of the crops. Thanks to textual sources it is partially possible to reconstruct the appearance of the Mesopotamian countryside and the different types of land exploited by the farmers.

=== Irrigation ===
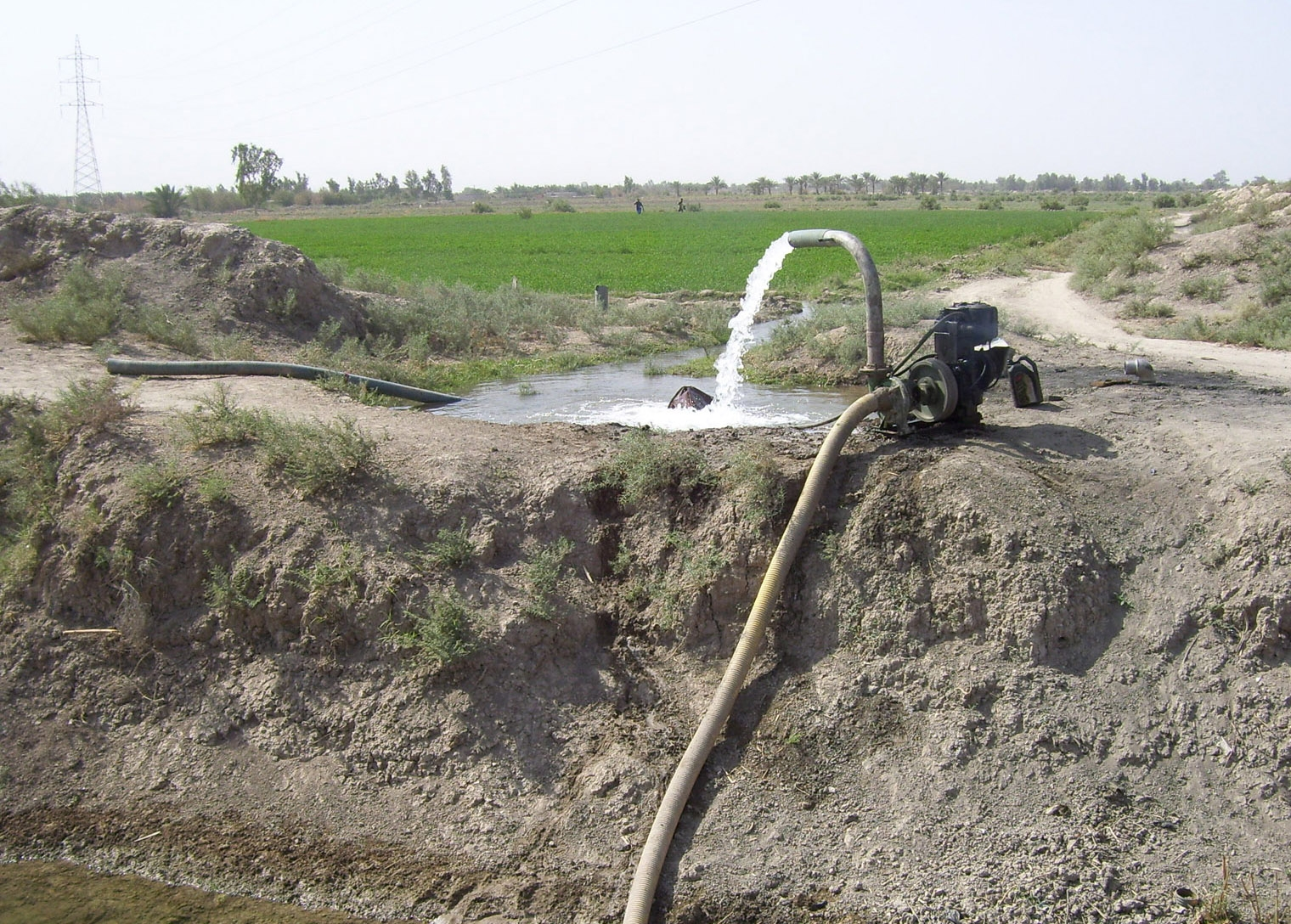
Modern-day irrigation ditch in Iraq, near Baghdad.

The first archaeological signs of irrigation in Mesopotamia appear around 6000 BC at Choga Mami in central Mesopotamia, during the Samarra culture (6200-5700 BC). Mesopotamia south of this site is very poorly attested in this period—it is possible that the first communities developed there at the same time and also made use of irrigation. Survival was only possible with the use of an irrigation system, since without it the viable agricultural area in this region was limited to the banks of the two great rivers. Canals were cut to bring the water that was needed for the plants to grow to the fields, but also to divert water and thus limit the damage from floods. When the water level was high, the larger canals became navigable and could be used for trade and communication. Irrigation was also adopted in areas where it was not absolutely necessary, in order to increase yields. Communities and rulers made the maintenance, repair, and dredging of irrigation infrastructure one of their highest priorities.

The water for irrigation was brought to the fields by canals. The largest of these were fed directly from the rivers and supplied water to smaller canals which supplied yet smaller channels, all the way down to small irrigation ditches. The system could also include raised canals and sometimes aqueducts, if the terrain required them. Some regulating mechanisms were in place to control the flow and the level of the water, such as closeable basins. The sediment carried in the rivers meant that their beds were higher than the fields on the floodplain, so the water could be brought to the fields using gravity alone, once a ditch had been cut in the side of the riverbank. However, mechanisms for raising water, like the shadoof and the noria, were in use from the first millennium BC. In some regions irrigation could also be effected from wells.

The irrigation network of Mari is well known from descriptions on small tablets from the first half of the 18th century BC relating to maintenance work and thus provides a useful case study. The tablets mention the 'mouth' (KA/pûm) where the water from the river entered the canal and deposits of clay had to be removed. The basic structure at this level was the muballitum, a mechanism which controlled the flow of water from the river and thus the water level of the canal. It was a barrier made out of wooden piles (tarqullum), reinforced with bundles of reeds and brush. The main canals (takkīrum) are distinguished from the minor calls (yābiltum) which flow from them. Valves (errētum) on the sides of the canals allowed water to be let out if the level rose too high. Ditches (atappum) were located at the end of the canal. Dams (kisirtum) were used to store water. Secondary basins were fed by terracotta pipes (mašallum). Maintenance of the canal was very intensive work: according to one letter, the governor of the district of Terqa had to mobilise nearly 2,000 men for the task and it seems that this force proved insufficient.

=== Fields and land division ===
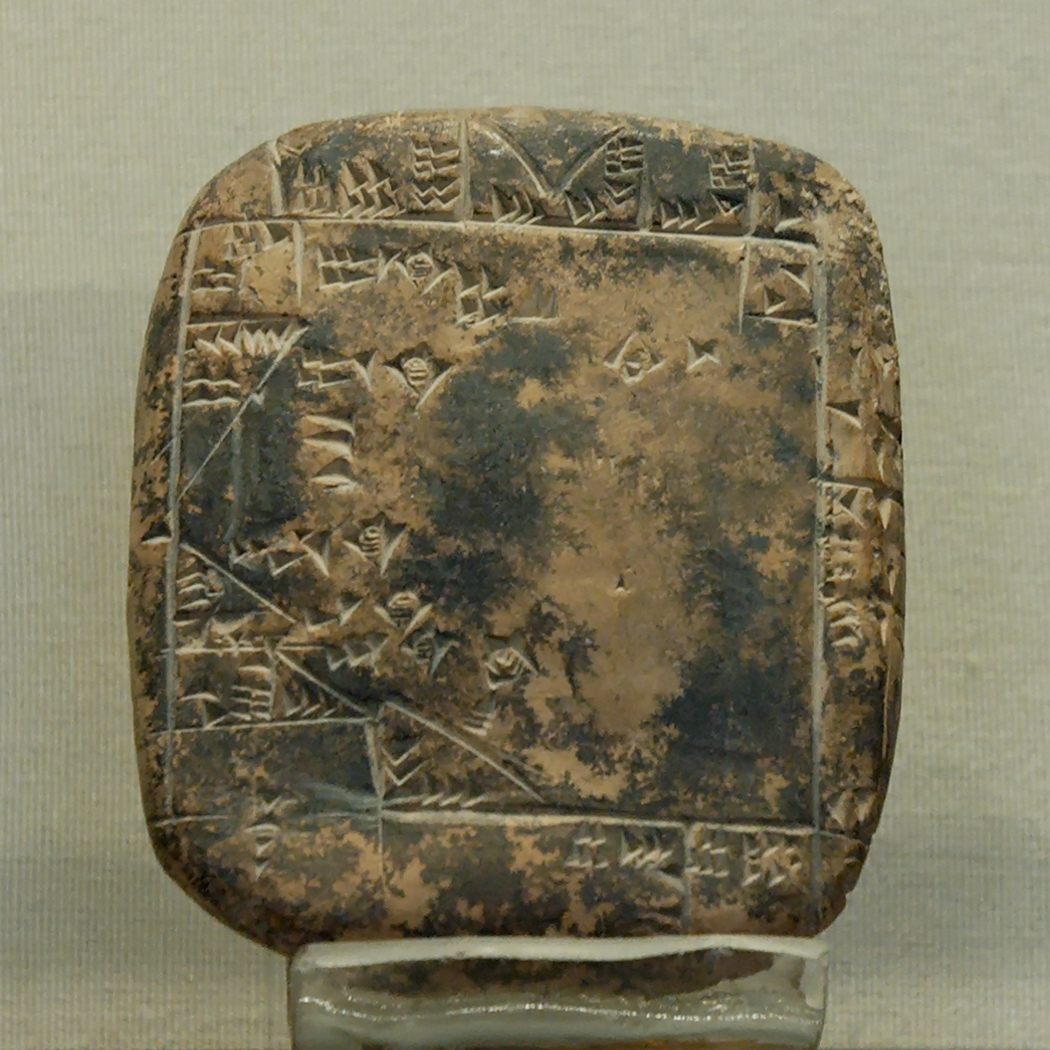
Tablet with a field plan, Umma, Ur III.

Various cuneiform documents contain descriptions of fields; about a hundred also depict field plans. The most common of these are small tablets. From the introduction of writing, the locations of fields were recorded. Under the Third dynasty of Ur, the first tablets appear with plans of fields which they describe. They were designed to help evaluate the returns that could be expected from the fields. As time went on, these descriptions grew more precise. The Neo-Babylonian and Achaemenid periods have furnished numerous documents of this type—some as tablets, but others as Kudurru (engraved stelae produced after a land grant). Generally, measuring and recording land took place when it was sold. The most precise texts specify the measurement of the sides, the owners of neighbouring plots, and divide the field into different parts based on the returns expected from them. Some of these documents may have been intended to inform people of the measurements made by surveyors and the estimated yields. The calculations of the area of a field are made by approximating the real shape of the field with regular geometric shapes which were easier to calculate—a rectangle for larger areas and triangles for any irregularities. The actual surveying was done with ropes (EŠ.GID in Sumerian, eblu(m) in Babylonian Akkadian, ašalu in Assyrian Akkadian). Surveyors are attested as specialised members of the royal administration in Ur III and the Old Babylonian periods.

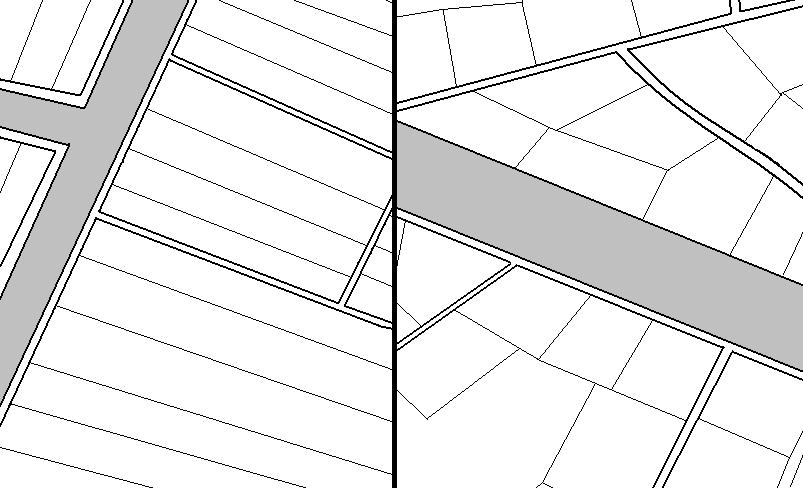
Representation of 'Sumerian' (left) and 'Akkadian' (right) field types, as proposed by Mario Liverani.

Through the analysis of these documents it is possible to reconstruct the appearance and location of the fields in ancient Mesopotamia. Fields in irrigated areas had to have direct access to a canal. This led to competition for access to the water sources and the width of fields was reduced in order to allow a larger number of them to cluster along the sides of the canals—a field was made larger by extending the length that it stretched away from the canal. The resulting fields were roughly rectangular, but much longer than they were wide, like the strips of wood in a parquet floor. According to Mario Liverani, this was the field layout found in Sumeria. Further north, around Akkad, the fields were wider—at least until the first millennium BC, when the elongated field layout seems to have spread to Babylonia as well. Liverani also argues that this layout was the result of central planning, designed to make optimal use of the area by ensuring the largest possible number of fields had access to the canal (and thus he attributes the spread of this type of layout to decisions of imperial authorities). Nothing like this layout is known from Upper Mesopotamia, except for the land around the city of Nuzi, where both elongated and broad fields are attested.

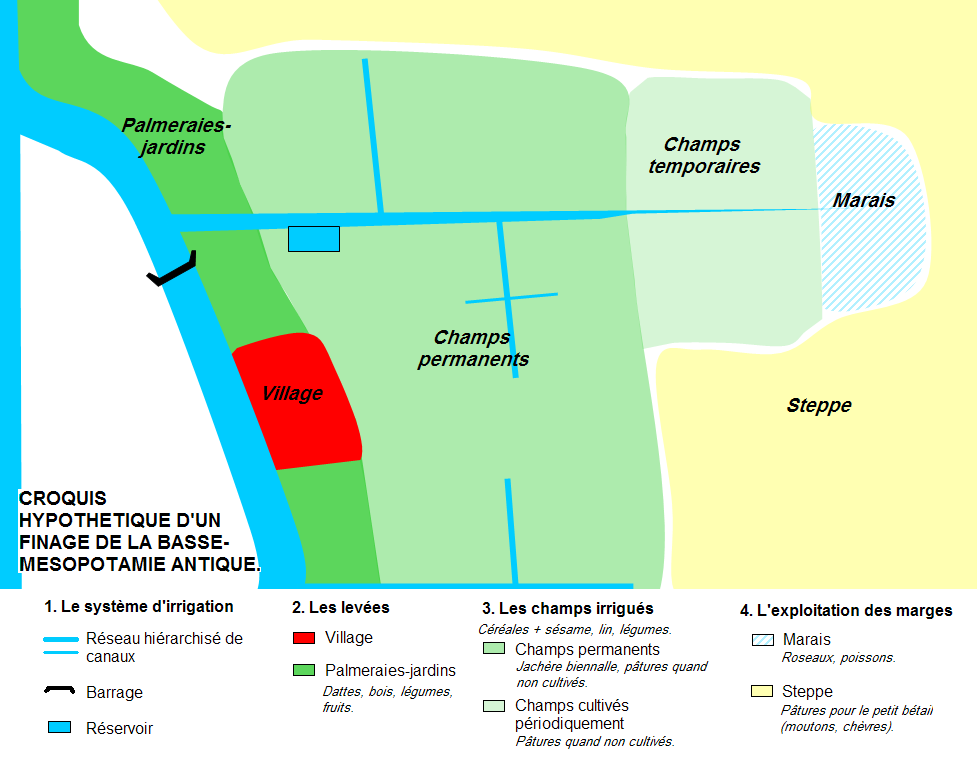
Hypothetical plan of a village's hinterland in ancient lower Mesopotamia.

In the areas of irrigated agriculture in the south, therefore, it was the irrigation canals that created the structure of agricultural land. The raised banks of the rivers were densely occupied spaces: Palmaries and orchards which needed to be close to the canals in order to be properly irrigated were located there, as were the villages. The most densely developed areas were located at the edge of the villages which formed the centre of the canal network (since the centres of these settlements were given over to non-agricultural purposes). As a canal stretched to the arid land at the edge of the irrigated area, the area that the canal was able to provide water to decreased, as did the quality of the soil. Uncultivated land was used to pasture farm animals. The edge of the irrigated area could also be formed by swampland, which could be used for hunting and fishing, or for growing reeds (especially in the far south of Mesopotamia). The line between the irrigated land and the desert or swampland was not static: fields could fall out of cultivation because there was too much salt in the soil and then desertification would follow; on the other hand, desert land could be brought under cultivation by extending the irrigation network. Similarly, marshland could be drained or expand at the edge of a recently irrigated area or following changes in the river's course.

In Upper Mesopotamia, areas of dry agriculture (Upper Jazirah and east of the Tigris) must be distinguished from those where irrigation was always required (Lower Jazirah). From the latter situation, the site of Mari is well-known, thanks to surviving texts: the cultivated zone was located on the low terraces of the Euphrates valley, where irrigation networks were developed, while the higher terraces were used for pasture, and the area furthest from the river (up to fifteen kilometres away) was a plateau that could be used for livestock. The topography of the north did not allow irrigation networks to extend as far as the broad flat plains of the south.

In the areas of dry agriculture in the Upper Jazirah, from the 4th to the 2nd millennium BC land was organised around fortified centres with a circular shape located on high points. The agricultural space around these centres was organised in concentric circles in a manner described by T.J. Wilkinson: a densely cultivated area around the fortified centre, then less intensely cultivated areas around secondary sites and finally a space used for pasturage. Because of the irregular rainfall, some areas of dry agriculture in the north came to be irrigated. For example, the countryside around Nuzi included both unirrigated and irrigated fields.

Archaeological surveys seem to indicate that the organisation of rural space in northern Mesopotamia changed at the end of the 2nd millennium BC, in line with the development of the Assyrian empire. The farmed area expanded and the Assyrian kings extended irrigation networks and gardens in many areas (especially around Nineveh).

=== Rural settlements ===
Texts and to a lesser degree archaeological survey allow us to discern the outlines of settlement in the Mesopotamian countryside. By contrast there has been little archaeological excavation of rural settlements of the historical period, since the focus has been on urban centres.

It seems that for the majority of its history, people in Lower Mesopotamia mostly lived in cities and the rise of village settlement only began in the second half of the second millennium BC when sites of more than two hectares constitute more than a quarter of known settlements. This 'ruralisation' of Babylonia continued in the following centuries. A large portion of the farmers must have resided in urban settlements, although some of these were quite small—surface area cannot decisively distinguish villages and cities (a site like Haradum, which is considered to be a city because of the buildings found in it, covered only 1 hectare). Nevertheless, texts indicate various types of rural settlement, whose exact nature is not easy to define: the É.DURU_{5}/kapru(m) were some sort of hamlet or large farm, but some settlements that seem to be villages were referred to with the same terms used to refer to cities (particularly URU/ālu(m)). The only definite 'village' that has been excavated in the south is the site of Sakheri Sughir near Ur, which dates to the archaic period, but only a very small area of the site has been excavated and only a few parts of buildings have been identified. Elsewhere, rural people are attested in texts living in isolated brick farmhouses, camps of tents like nomads, or in reed huts (huṣṣetu(m)) that were characteristic of the south. There were also centres—often fortified—which served as centres for the exploitation of large areas (dunnu(m) and dimtu(m), the latter literally meaning 'tower'). An example has been excavated in the Balikh valley at Tell Sabi Abyad which is a walled settlement measuring 60 x 60 metres containing a master's house, a steward's house, some administrative buildings, and a few other structures. Salvage excavations in the Hamrin basin in the Diyala valley have partially revealed several similar centres from the Kassite period, containing workshops of artisans (especially potters): Tell Yelkhi (a kind of rural manor), Tell Zubeidi, and Tell Imlihiye. Other things were also built in rural areas, such as cisterns, threshing floors, and granaries.

=== Risk management ===
The administration of the Mesopotamian countryside was also motivated by a desire to ameliorate various kinds of risk that could affect agricultural activities and rural and urban society more generally. The irrigation system was also designed to limit the risk of floods, by means of basins that could retain excess water and canals that could drain it away, as well as dams. The fragility of the soil, particularly in the south, also required management and specific cultural practices to protect it. The most simple of these was the practice of crop rotation, which was not difficult since there was no shortage of cultivable land in the region. The choice of crops and animals that were adapted to the dry climate and poor soils (barley, date palms, sheep) was another solution to this problem. The layout of the fields seems to have been designed to protect them from erosion: lines of trees were planted at the edges of the cultivated area to protect it from the winds, some areas were left fallow so that the plants and weeds would grow there and protect the soil from wind erosion. The practice of combining palm orchards and gardens enabled the large trees to protect smaller plants from the sun and harsh winds.

The largest problem for farmers in the south seems to have been the salinisation of the soil. Thorkild Jacobsen and Robert McC. Adams have argued that this caused an ecological crisis in Babylonia in the 18th-17th centuries BC. If this problem was really caused by the high salt content of the soil and their irrigation system brought a rising amount of salt-carrying water to the surface, then the ancient Mesopotamians seem to have developed techniques that ameliorated this issue: control of the quantity of water discharged into the field, soil leaching to remove salt, and the practice of leaving land to lie fallow. It is not certain that the salinisation of land in southern Mesopotamia actually did lead to a fall in output and crisis in the long-term, but it did constitute a constant year-to-year problem.

Another recurrent risk for Mesopotamian farmers was influxes of insects, particularly desert locusts, which could fall upon the fields in large numbers and devour all the crops. The governors of Mari fought them with water from the canals, trying to drown their larvae and drive off the adults, or by getting men and beasts to crush them.

== Crops ==
Mesopotamia had been on the margin of developments in the Neolithic and the origins of agriculture and pastoralism took place in Mount Taurus, the Levant, and the Zagros, but it clearly participated in the second phase of major changes which took place in the Near East over the course of the 4th millennium BC, which are referred to as the 'second agricultural revolution' or the 'revolution of secondary products' in the case of pastoralism. These changes were characterised by the expansion of cereal cultivation following the invention of the plough and irrigation; the expansion of pastoralism, especially the raising of sheep for wool, but also beasts of burden such as cattle and donkeys, and dairy animals; and cultivation of fruit trees, such as date palms, olives, grapes, etc. They were accompanied by the establishment of the first states, the first cities, and these institutions possessed vast fields of cereals and great herds of sheep.

From this time forward, the Mesopotamians possessed a great variety of agricultural products and also a significant quantity of domestic animals. This ensemble continued to be augmented over the millennia by imports from outside Mesopotamia and by local innovations (improvement to tools with the rise of metallurgy, new breeds of plant and animal, etc.). Throughout antiquity, agricultural produce centres on some basic elements, notably barley and sheep (along with date palms in the south). But gardens enabled the diversification of food sources, thanks especially to legumes. It must be remembered that ancillary activities like hunting, fishing, the exploitation of marshes and woods, were necessary complements to agriculture.

Textual sources include significant evidence for the rhythms of farming and herding, but the vocabulary is often obscure and quantification is difficult. The study of archaeological evidence to identify the remains of plants and pollen (archaeobotany and palynology) and animals (archaeozoology) consumed at ancient sites is also necessary. Much is still unknown, but recent studies, particularly those published in the eight volumes of the Bulletin of Sumerian Agriculture, have considerably advanced our knowledge.

=== Cereals ===
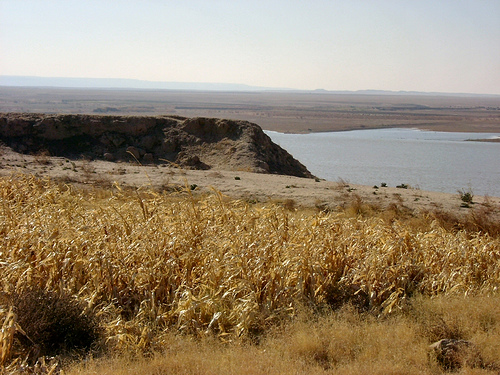
Field of cereal near the Euphrates in the northwest of modern Iraq.

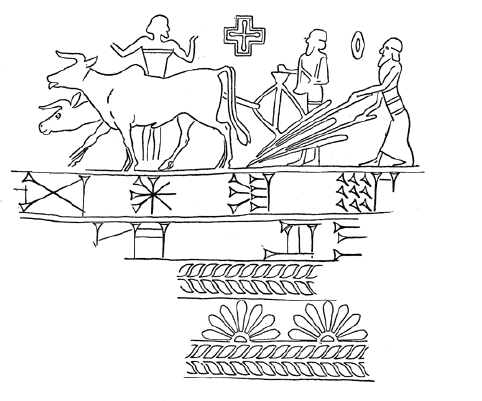
Seal impression from the Kassite period (late 14th century BC), representing a group of labourers pulling a plough.

Mesopotamia is a great cereal producer. Most important were barley (Sumerian ŠE/ Akkadian še'u(m)), because it was the best adapted to the dry, saline soil and to the hot temperatures of the region, while its short growing cycle meant it could reach maturity even in particularly hot, dry years. It was the main food of the population and was often used as a medium of exchange. Emmer wheat (ZIZ/zizzu(m)) was also cultivated, but in smaller quantities, as well as spelt (GIG/kibtu(m)). In the 1st millennium BC, rice (kurangu) was introduced, but was not very widely cultivated.

==== Barley ====
A Sumerian text known as the Farmer's Almanac (or Instructions of the Farmer) informs us about the techniques employed to cultivate barley in southern Mesopotamia. This information can be supplemented with that available in the agricultural management texts. The agricultural year is defined by several periods of intense work and other necessary maintenance of the fields: (Note: For attempts at holistic reconstruction of the Sumerian agricultural year, see: LaPlaca & Powell 1990, pp. 75–104, The Agricultural Cycle and the Calendar at Pre-Sargonic Girsu and Hruška 1990, pp. 105–114, Das landwirtschaftliche Jahr im alten Sumer: Versuch einer Rekonstruktion.)

- Firstly, towards the end of summer (August–September), the field must be irrigated in order to loosen up the desiccated soil after the summer heat. Then, at the beginning of autumn, work begins on the preparation of the soil. The plough employed is the ard (APIN/epinnu(m)), drawn by four oxen, arrayed two-by-two. The ard reaches only 15–20 cm into the earth, but this is sufficient in the thin soil of southern Mesopotamia. If necessary, however, the work could be completed with a hoe (AL/allu(m)) and a spade (MAR/marru(m)).
- Sowing then took place in the autumn (largely in October–November). A prior estimate of the quantity of grain that ought to be sown was carried out in order to ensure optimal production. The seeds and beasts of burden were prepared, and teams of labourers were formed. The ploughs were equipped with a seeder—a kind of funnel designed to leave the seed buried behind the plough as it turned the soil. The grain was planted at regular intervals of around 60–75 cm.
- At the end of autumn and during the winter, the field needed to be weeded and irrigated repeatedly. Apparently, no other techniques for improving the soil were undertaken at this time. The animals were removed from the seeded fields in order to avoid damaging them.
- In spring (April–May), the harvest began, just before the river level began to rise, or at the same time. This was a period of intense labour. The ears of wheat were cut with ceramic, stone, and metal sickles. The ears of wheat were collected in threshing areas where the grain was separated from the chaff using a threshing board (a wooden board pulled by oxen of donkeys, with flints attached, which separates the grain from the stems and cut up the straw), then winnowed. It is at this moment that the harvest is distributed between the different actors, in order to settle debts and pay rents. Then the grain is placed in storage, in June–July at the latest.

Cultural practices served to protect the productivity of the fields, especially from the danger of salinisation in the south. Biennial ley farming was generally practiced and sometimes fields were left fallow for longer periods of time. The soil was also washed regularly in order to expel the salt. Crop rotation may also have been practiced.

=== Date palms ===
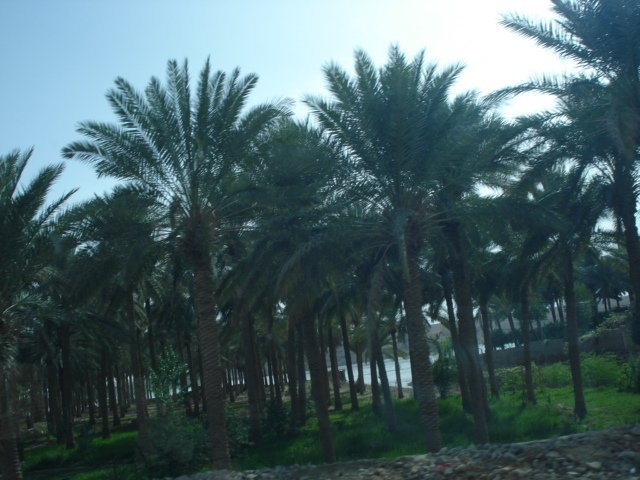
Palm orchard in modern Iraq, near Baghdad.

The cultivation of date palms (GIŠ.GIŠIMMAR/gišimarru(m)) played a major role in the south. This tree requires a lot of water and is naturally found along the edge of watercourses. It thrives in saline soils and high temperatures. Thus, conditions were very favourable for its development in lower Mesopotamia. The palm was cultivated in great palm orchards, which are represented in bas reliefs from the Neo-Sumerian period. They were irrigated and divided into multiple groups of trees that had been planted at the same time. The palm only begins producing dates (ZÚ.LUM.MA/suluppū(m)) in its fifth year and lives for about sixty years. Developing a palm orchard was therefore a medium-term investment and an orchard needed to be supplemented regularly by planting new trees. The Mesopotamians developed an artificial pollinisation system to maximise their return—the male pollen was placed on the female stamens at the top of the tree by hand with the aid of a ladder.

=== Other field crops ===
In addition to the cereals, other crops were cultivated in the irrigated fields, but played a less central role. They were sometimes referred to as 'minor' crops (ṣihhirtu(m)) in the Old Babylonian period. They include many plants:

- Flax (GADA/kitū(m)) was apparently not much cultivated in Mesopotamia before the 1st millennium BC, although it had been well-known since the Neolithic. It was mainly used for producing linen textiles, but its grains could also be eaten or used for the production of linseed oil.
- Sesame (ŠE.GIŠ.Ì/šamaššammū(m)) was the most important crop grown in the fields after cereals. It was introduced to Mesopotamia around the end of the 3rd millennium BC, from India. It required irrigation to grow. The seeds were planted in spring and the harvest took place at the end of the summer. It was used to produce sesame oil, which was used for food, hygiene, and as fuel for lamps. The seeds could also be eaten.
- Various legumes, such as chick peas (hallūru(m)), vetch (kiššanu(m)), and other kinds of pea, lentil, and beans were an important supplement to the cereals.
- Onions were also grown in the fields.

=== Garden and orchard crops ===
In the gardens/orchards (GIŠ.KIRI_{6}/kirū(m)), which were sometimes incorporated into the palmeries, there were various vegetables. which do not seem to have been focussed on a specific type of cultivar. The most commonly attested are green leaves, cucumbers, leeks, garlic, onion, legumes (lentils, chickpeas, beans), and various kinds of herbs. There were also fruit trees, especially pomegranates, figs, and apples, but also quinces and pears. The gardens of the Neo-Assyrian and Neo-Babylonian kings included a very great variety of crops, which are enumerated in texts that glory in these kings ability to bring together plants from throughout their domains. In particular, they made efforts to acclimatise the olive and cotton.

=== Vines ===
Grape vines grow mainly in the north of Mesopotamia and were not widespread in the south, where the climate is not favourable for them. Several Sumerian texts indicate that they were found in orchards, but only at their edges. On the other hand, vines were common in Upper Mesopotamia. In the 18th century BC, there was a cite south of Djebel Sindjar named Karanâ, which literally means "wine" (karānu(m) in Akkadian; GEŠTIN), indicating that there were many vines growing on the slopes of the hill. Documentation on wine is especially rich for the Neo-Assyrian period, when the kingdom's high dignitaries possessed substantial wineries, as attested by a cadastral document relating to territory near Harran. In the same period, distributions of wine were a common feature of life at the royal court. Grapes could be consumed as food or converted into wine. The process of winemaking is not attested in Mesopotamian texts. Wine is attested, but was drunk less often than beer, which remained the chief alcoholic drink of Mesopotamia. Instead, wine was a luxury product, with the best vintages produced in the mountainous regions bordering Mesopotamia (Syria, eastern Anatolia, the Zagros Mountains), and imported by the Mesopotamian royal courts, which seems to indicated that the wine produced in Mesopotamia itself was of comparatively low quality.

=== Animal husbandry ===
==== Sheep ====
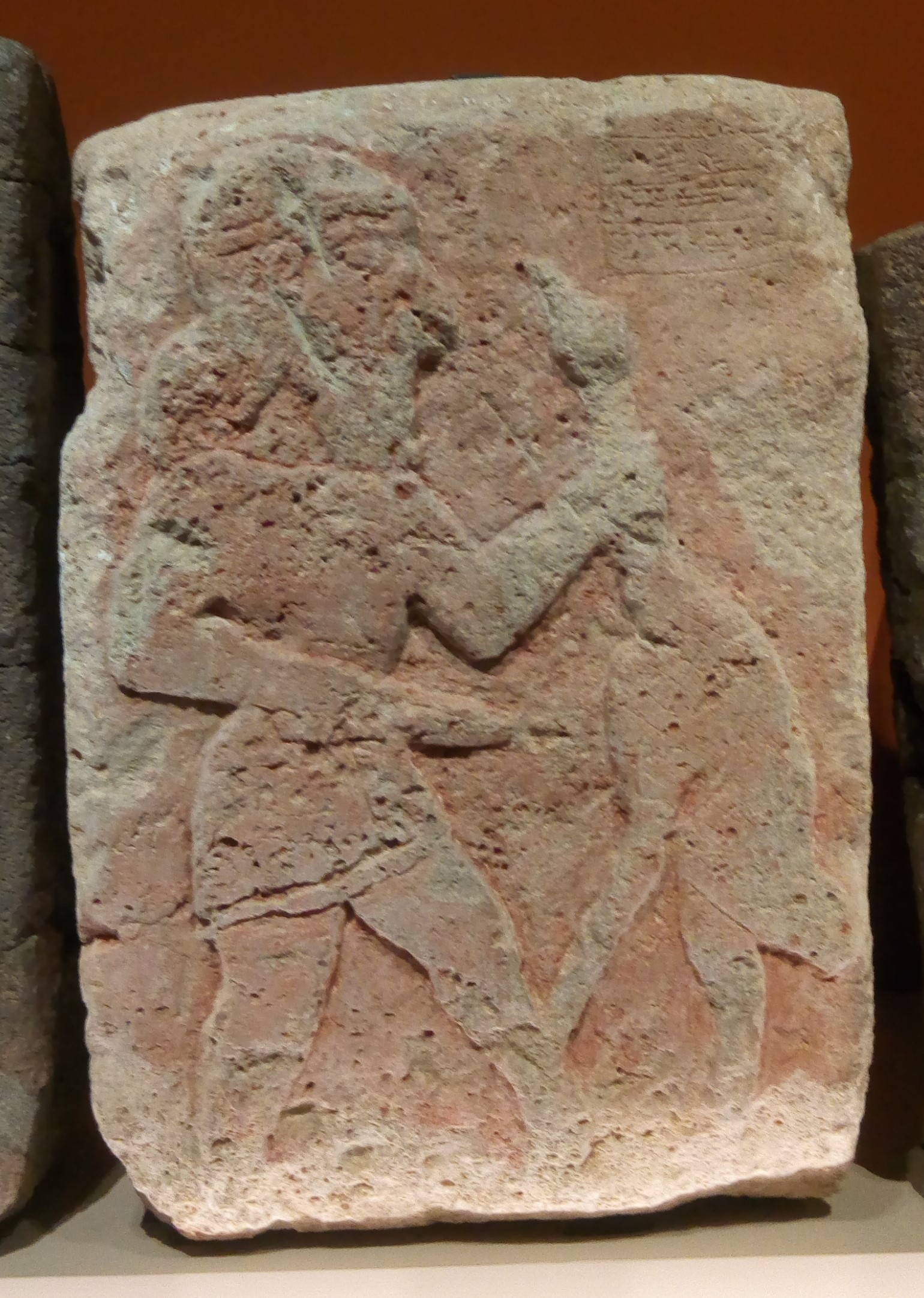
Bas-relief from the palace of Tell Halaf, 9th century BC, showing a man slaughtering a sheep

Sheep (UDU/immeru(m)) were by far the most common farm animal in Mesopotamia and numerous types are attested in textual sources. They were well adapted to the small areas of pasture in the region, notably the areas of steppe, as a result of their ability to survive off very little nourishment. Small-scale farmers kept sheep, but the largest and best known flocks are those that were owned by institutions, which could consist of hundred or thousands of animals. Several different practices are attested. Often, they were placed on uncultivated land at the edge of the inhabited area in order to graze. At other times, they were fattened up in stables (especially sheep that were to be sacrificed to the gods), and transhumance was practiced with the stock of temples in southern Mesopotamia, who sent their herds out to the better pastures in central and northern Mesopotamia. Care of sheep was generally entrusted to specialists, who watched over the herds and were responsible for any lost animals. The animals were raised primarily for their wool, which was an essential material for Mesopotamian workshops, but also for their meat and milk.

==== Cattle ====
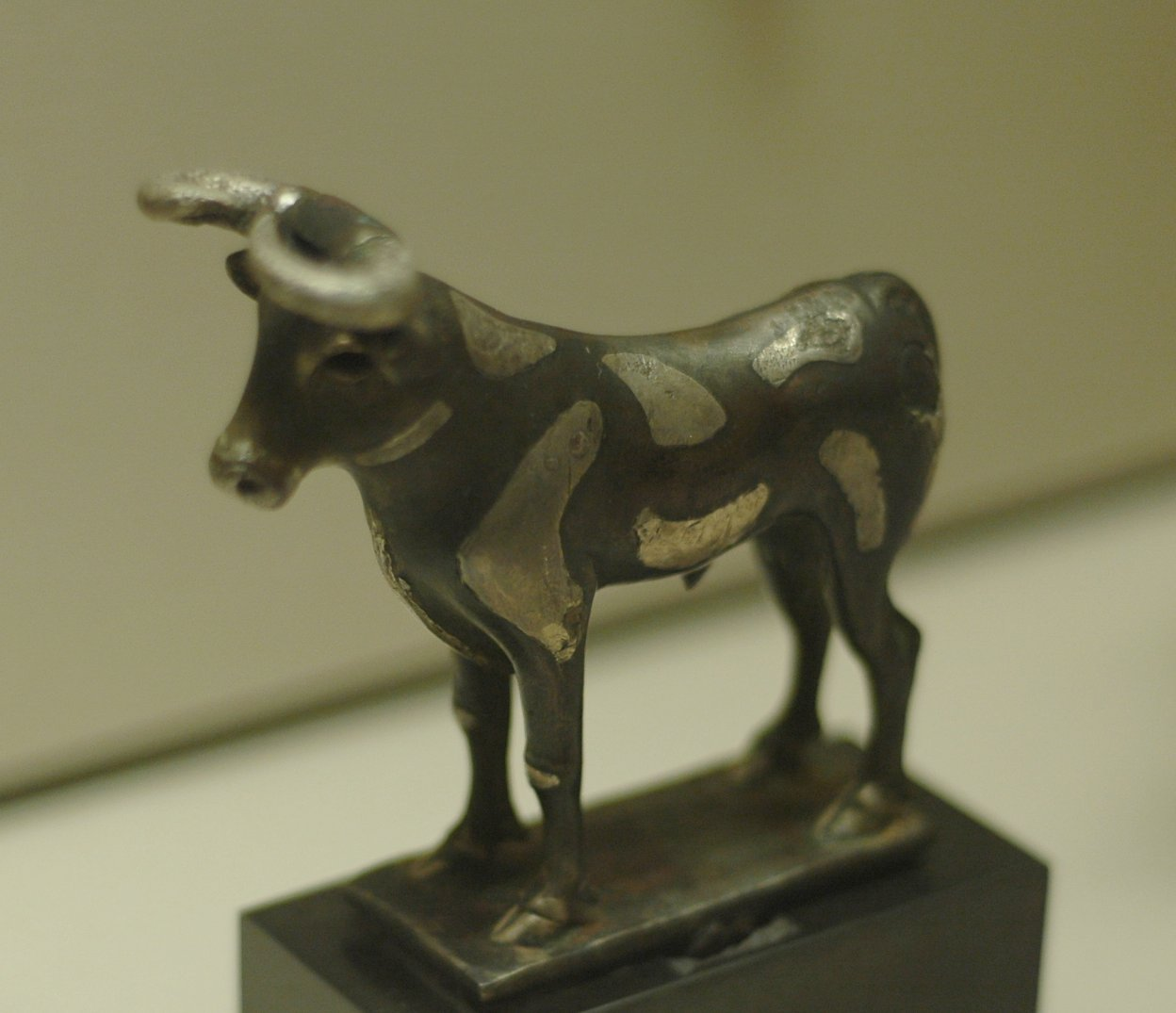
Bronze statuette of a bull inlaid with silver, Early Dynastic Period III, Louvre.

Cattle (GU_{4}, alpu(m) ) were more difficult to raise than sheep, but also more valuable. They were an essential part of Mesopotamian agriculture, notably because of their role as beasts of burden. Their importance is shown by the fact that they are the only domestic animals that were sometimes given names by their owners. Several texts relating to institutional estates inform us of the care taken of them. Weaned calves were fed on fodder composed of grain and reeds, and could be used to pull ploughs once they reached three years of age. Unlike smaller animals, working cattle could not survive off the meagre Mesopotamian pasture land and thus they had to receive rations, like humans, and thus were more expensive to maintain. Some cattle were raised for their meat and cows were valued for their milk.

==== Other domestic animals ====
Goats (ÙZ, enzu(o)) were often raised along with sheep and were often found on smallholdings. They required less water than sheep, survived better in arid environments, but they were clearly not farmed on the same scale, because their skins were not as important to the Mesopotamian economy as sheep's wool and their meat also seems to have been less valued. They were also milked.

Among the four major domestic animals of the Near East, pigs (ŠAH, šahū(m)) had a special place, since they were raised for their meat and fat but lacked any other economic role. They nevertheless seem to have been very widespread, being raised in small groups without much expense, at least until the 1st millennium BC, when they are mentioned in administrative texts less and less. In Neo-Babylonian times they are no longer present, and this disappearance is accompanied by the development of a negative picture of the animal in literary texts.

Equids were domesticated late in Mesopotamian history, with the donkey (ANŠE/imēru(o) ) only appearing clearly in the 4th millennium BC and the horse (ANŠE.KUR.RA/sīsu(m)) arriving from elsewhere around the beginning of the 2nd millennium BC. They were joined by the onager which could be tamed, and the mule. The donkey rapidly came to play an essential role as a beast of burden, allowing the development of a system of caravans for long-distance transportation. The horse rapidly became a highly valued animal among the elites, especially warriors. The training of horses was the focus of a great deal of attention. The large areas of pasture in Mesopotamia are located in the north, but pale beside the areas available outside Mesopotamia in western Iran and the Caucasus. Starting around 2000 BC and especially in the 1st millennium BC, the dromedary and the camel (ANŠE.A.AB.BA/ibilu) were introduced and came to play an important role as beasts of burden and transport. Their meat and milk was also consumed.

Other domestic animals included the dog (UR.GI_{7}, kalbu(m)), and those used by rulers for hunting were the object of special attention. Farmyard birds attested from the beginning of Mesopotamian history include geese, ducks, and pigeons. Chickens were introduced from India late in the period, around the beginning of the 1st millennium BC. Poultry were mainly raised for their meat and their eggs. Finally, apiculture was developed in Mesopotamia at the beginning of the 1st millennium BC. Before this, honey and beeswax were collected from wild hives.

=== Related activities ===
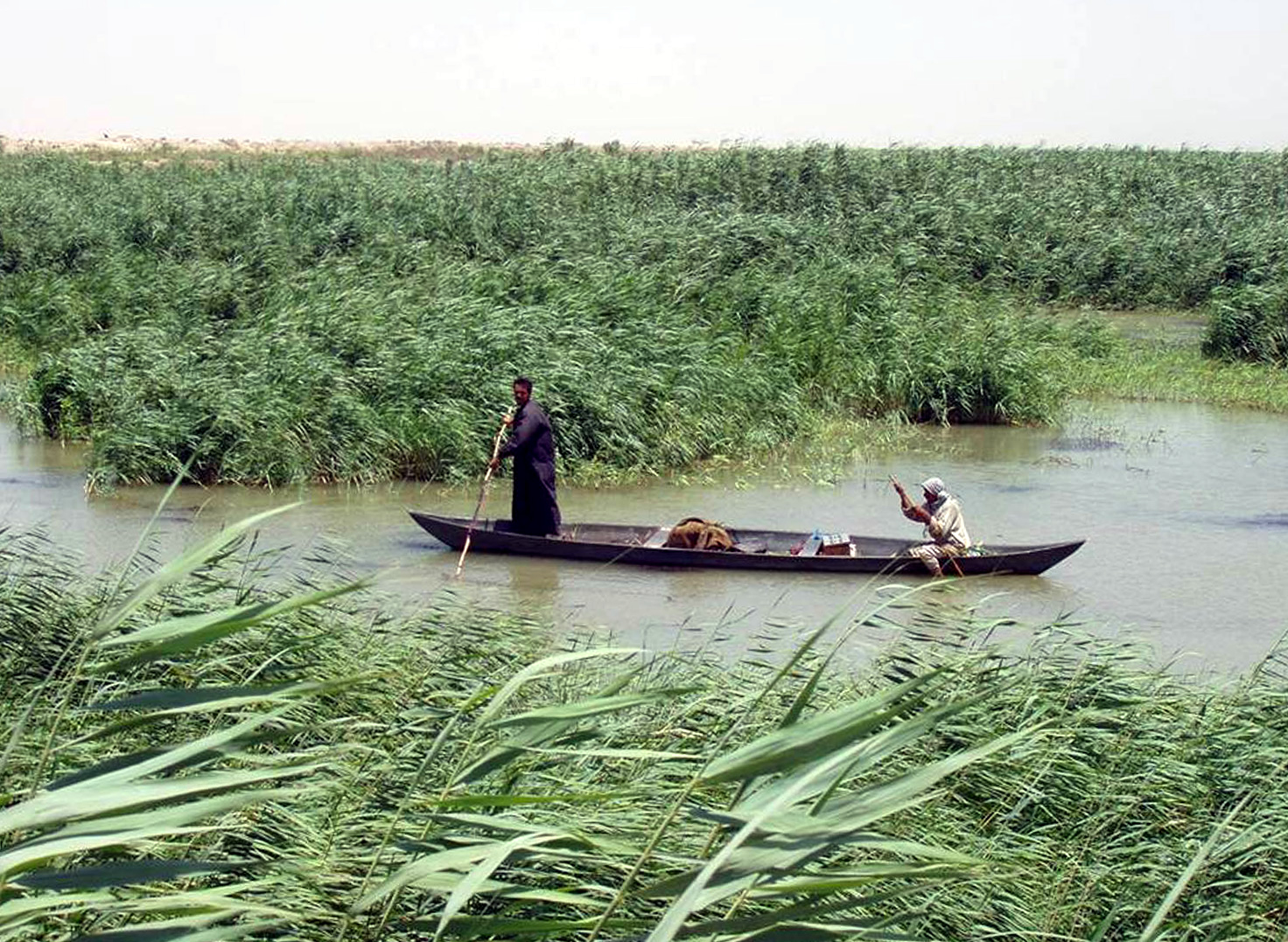
Mesopotamian Marshes in the south of modern Iraq.

==== Hunting and fishing ====
Human exploitation of the Mesopotamian environment also involved some activities which do not fall into the classes of agriculture or animal husbandry, but which are related to them. Hunting and fishing were important, primarily as a source of food, but by the historical period they played a secondary role compared to animal husbandry. There were specialist hunters and fishers employed by major institutions, but regular people also engaged in both activities. There were many wild animals that could be killed or captured: gazelles, goats, cattle, boar, foxes, hares, various birds, and even insects, as well as a large variety of fish which could be caught in the swamps, rivers, canals, and at sea in the Persian Gulf.

==== Reeds and timber ====
The numerous swamps in the south part of Mesopotamia supplied various kinds of reed (especially Phragmites australis) in great quantity. Reeds were collected for various purposes, notably the construction of buildings (huts, palisades, reinforcing chains in mud-brick walls, etc.), boats, baskets, and the reed pens used for inscribing cuneiform into clay tablets.

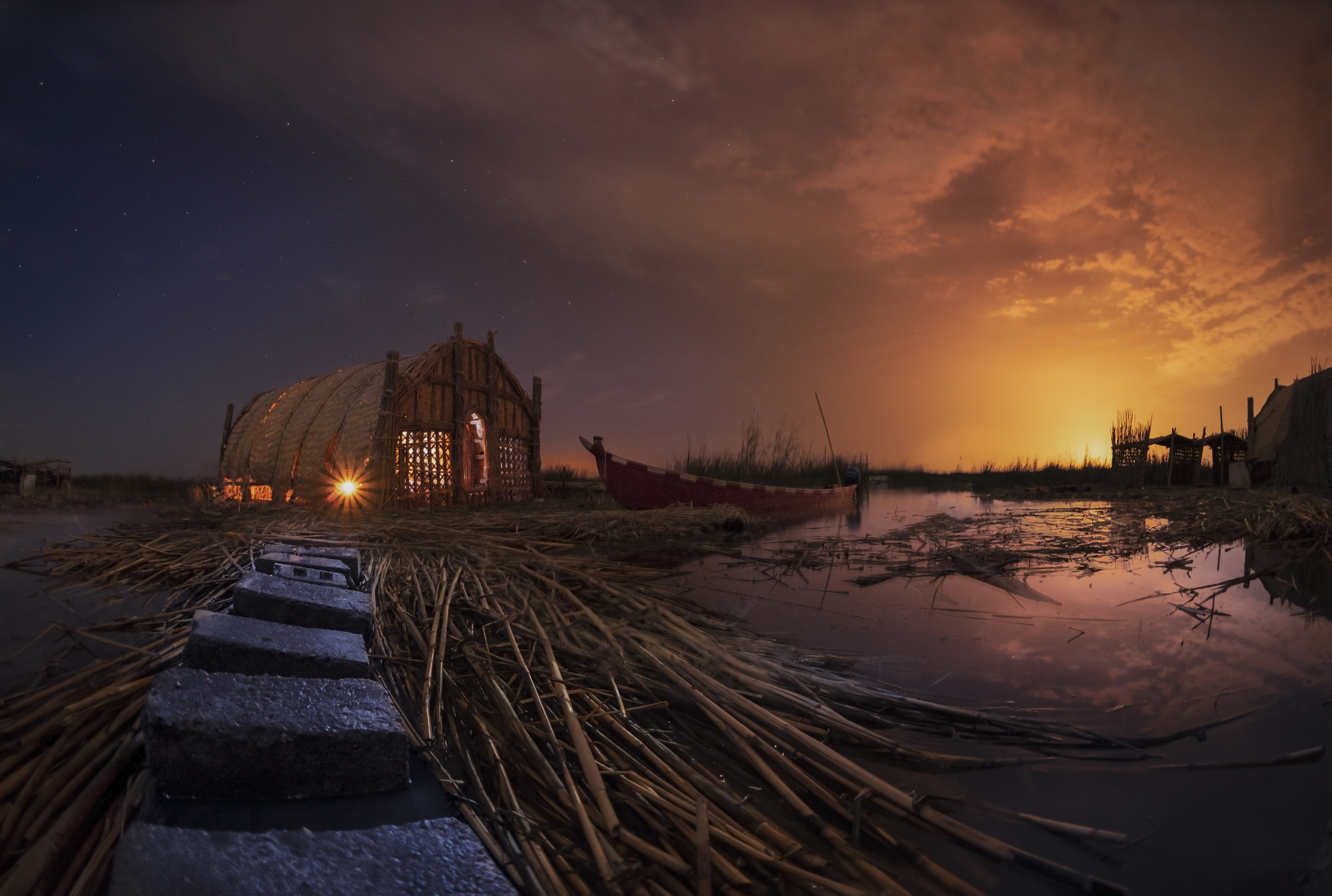
Mudhif is a traditional reed house built for at least 5,000 years, south of Iraq.

Ancient Mesopotamia also had an appreciable supply of timber, which has since largely disappeared as a result of over-exploitation. Most prominent were the date-palms, but there were also poplars, tamarisks, willows, junipers, and others, which were used for their wood as well as their fruit, wherever possible. This local timber was mainly used in small-scale construction; the great palaces and temples, as well as luxury wooden items, required quality timber imported from further afield (cedar of Lebanon, ebony, cypress, etc.). These foreign trees could also be planted in Mesopotamia (arboriculture), with stands of foreign timber attested in the south from the end of the 3rd millennium BC. Teams of lumberjacks were sent to tend to and harvest the forests of major institutions at the beginning of spring and autumn.

== Economic organisation of agriculture and animal husbandry ==
Reconstructing the organisation of the ancient economy from the surviving sources (mainly textual) faces numerous difficulties. Agricultural activity in ancient Mesopotamia is documented by tens of thousands of administrative documents, but they generally relate to a specific sector of the economy—the institutions of the royal palace and the temples, and, to a lesser degree, the private domains of the elites. It is their activities and initiatives which are the main source of information, and one of the ongoing debates in scholarship is whether they are representative of the majority of agricultural activity or if a large portion of the agricultural economy is unknown to us because it never required the production of written documentation. The theoretical models used to attempt to reconstruct how the Mesopotamian economy functioned and the goals of its actors thus play a decisive role in scholarly work. It appears, at any rate, that agriculture and animal husbandry involved a large part of the human resources of Mesopotamia, created various complex connections between individuals through different formal and informal agreements, and provided a large part of what was necessary for Mesopotamian society's subsistence.

=== Theoretical models ===
Analysis of ancient Mesopotamian society and its economy poses various problems of interpretation, when one attempts to operate at the general level of reconstructing the principles that guided the activities and choices of actors. Theoretical assumptions of researchers—even if unstated—have tended to guide their interpretations. Early in the history of study of cuneiform documents, there were attempts to apply frameworks developed from the study of other civilizations, which is especially notable in analyses of Mesopotamian society which describe it as "feudal" and in interpretations inspired by Marxist theories of the economy (especially the idea of the "Asiatic mode of production"). The approach of Max Weber has also provided some useful interpretations.

But the fundamental opposition in the analysis of ancient economies is the dichotomy between "formalists" and "substantivists", which is related to an earlier dichotomy between "modernists" and "primitivists".

The "formalist" model is based on the hypotheses of the neoclassical economics. It considers whether economic agents were or were not "rational", i.e. consumers are motivated by the goal of maximising their utility and producers by the goal of profit maximization. According to this model, the economy follows timeless, universal laws, the market exists in all societies and, in optimal conditions of pure and perfect competition, prices are fixed by supply and demand, permitting an efficient allocation of the means of production, and Pareto efficiency. In this case, one could use the tools of modern economic analysis to study ancient economies, which is why this position is characterised as "modernist".

By contrast, the substantivist model derives from the works of Karl Polanyi, who thought that pre-industrial economies were embedded in society and thus different civilizations had their own economic systems, not universal economic laws, and thus they could not be studied outside of their social context. On this point of view, individuals had their own "rationality" that would not be found in other societies in the same form. In this case, modern economic tools were not necessarily in operation and other factors like redistribution, reciprocity, and exchange must be considered first. Some researchers of this movement like J. Renger would even exclude the idea of profit in the ancient world at all, claiming that the ancients utilised surpluses solely to increase their prestige and to serve the cult of the gods.

This description of models represent extreme cases for their explanatory value, but in fact scholars studying the Mesopotamian economy rarely adopt such extreme positions. As M. Van de Mieroop recognises, there are many scholars who use tools of contemporary economic analysis on the ancient economy, while taking account of the specific details of the societies in question.

== See also ==
- Origins of agriculture in West Asia

== Bibliography ==
- Bottéro, J.; Kramer, S. N. (1989). Lorsque les Dieux faisaient l'Homme. Paris: Gallimard. ISBN 2070713822.
- Charpin, D. (2003). Hammu-rabi de Babylone. Paris: Presses universitaires de France. ISBN 2130539637.
- Englund, R. K. (1998). "Texts from the Late Uruk Period". In J. Bauer, R. K. Englund & M. Krebernik (ed.). Mesopotamien, Späturuk-Zeit und Frühdynastische Zeit. Fribourg et Göttingen: Universitätsverlag. pp. 15–233. ISBN 3-525-53797-2.
- Garelli, P.; Durand, J.-M.; Gonnet, H.; Breniquet, C. (1997). Le Proche-Orient asiatique, tome 1 : Des origines aux invasions des peuples de la mer. Paris: Presses universitaires de France. ISBN 9782130475279.
- Garelli, P.; Lemaire, A. (2001). Le Proche-Orient Asiatique, tome 2 : Les empires mésopotamiens, Israël. Paris: Presses universitaires de France. ISBN 2130471978.
- Grandpierre, V. (2010). Histoire de la Mésopotamie. Paris: Gallimard. ISBN 2070396053.
- Graslin-Thomé, L. (2009). Les échanges à longue distance en Mésopotamie au I^{er} millénaire : une approche économique. Paris: De Boccard. ISBN 2701802687.
- Huot, J.-L. (1989). Les Sumériens, entre le Tigre et l'Euphrate. Paris: Errance. ISBN 2903442967.
- Jas, R. M. (2000). Rainfall and agriculture in Northern Mesopotamia. Istanbul: Nederlands Historisch-Archeologisch Instituut te Istanbul. ISBN 9062580890.
- Joannès, F. (2000). La Mésopotamie au I^{er} millénaire avant J.-C. Paris: A. Colin. ISBN 2200261209.
- Joannès, F. (2001). Dictionnaire de la civilisation mésopotamienne. Paris: R. Laffont. ISBN 2221092074.
- Klengel, H.; Renger, J. (1999). Landwirtschaft im Alten Orient. Berlin: D. Reimer. ISBN 3496026529.
- Lafont, B. (1999). "Sumer, II. La société sumérienne, 1. Institutions, économie et société". Supplément au Dictionnaire de la Bible fasc. 72.
- Lafont, Bertrand; Tenu, Aline; Clancier, Philippe; Joannès, Francis (2017). Mésopotamie: De Gilgamesh à Artaban (3300-120 av. J.-C.). Paris: Belin. ISBN 978-2-7011-6490-8.
- LaPlaca, P. J.; Powell, Marvin A. (1990). "The Agricultural Cycle and the Calendar at Pre-Sargonic Girsu". In Postgate, J. N.; Powell, M. A. (eds.). Irrigation and Cultivation in Mesopotamia Part II. Bulletin on Sumerian Agriculture. Vol. 5. Cambridge: Sumerian Agriculture Group. pp. 65–104.
- Leick, G. (2007). The Babylonian World. Londres et New York: Routledge. ISBN 0415436257.
- Menu, B. (2004). La dépendance rurale dans l'Antiquité égyptienne et proche-orientale. Cairo: Institut français d'archéologie orientale. ISBN 2724703839.
- Van de Mieroop, M. (1999). Cuneiform Texts and the Writing of History. London and New York: Routledge. ISBN 0415195322.
- Potts, D. T. (1997). Mesopotamian Civilization: The Material Foundations. London: The Athlons Press. ISBN 0485930013.
- Postgate, J. N. (1992). Early Mesopotamia: Society and Economy at the Dawn of History (1st ed.). Taylor & Francis. doi:10.4324/9780203825662.
- Postgate, J. N. (2007). The Land of Assur & The Yoke of Assur: Studies on Assyria 1971-2005. Oxford: Oxbow Books. ISBN 9781782977414.
- Sanlaville, P. (2000). Le Moyen-Orient arabe, Le milieu et l'homme (in French). Paris: Armand Colin. doi:10.7202/022967ar. ISBN 9782200251604.
- Sasson, J. M. (1995). Civilizations of the Ancient Near East. New York: Scribner. ISBN 0684192799.
- Stol, Martin (1984). "Beans, Peas, Lentils and Vetches in Akkadian Texts". Bulletin on Sumerian Agriculture. 2: 127–139.
- Westbrook, R.; Beckman, G. M. (2003). A History of Ancient Near Eastern Law. Leiden: Brill.
- Wiggerman, F. A. M. (2011). "Agriculture as Civilization: Sages, Farmers and Barbarians". In K. Radner et E. Robson (ed.). The Oxford Handbook of Cuneiform Culture. Oxford: Oxford University Press.
- Hruška, B. (1990). "Das landwirtschaftliche Jahr im alten Sumer: Versuch einer Rekonstruktion" [The Agricultural Year in Ancient Sumer: An Attempt at Reconstruction]. Bulletin on Sumerian Agriculture (in German). 5. Cambridge: Sumerian Agriculture Group: 105–114.
