= Edward Chiera =

Italian-American archaeologist (1885–1933)

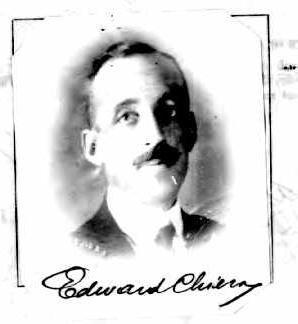
- Edward Chiera, 1924
- Born: August 5, 1885; Rome, Italy
- Died: June 20, 1933 (aged 47); Chicago, Illinois
- Scientific career
- Fields: archaeology Assyriology
- Workplaces: University of Chicago, University of Pennsylvania, American Schools of Oriental Research

Edward Chiera (August 5, 1885 – June 20, 1933) was an Italian-American archaeologist, Assyriologist, and scholar of religions and linguistics.

Born in Rome, Italy, in 1885, Chiera trained as a theologian at the Crozer Theological Seminary (B.D. 1911, Th.M. 1912). He completed his doctorate at the University of Pennsylvania (Ph.D. 1913). He was faculty of the University of Pennsylvania until 1927, at which time he joined the Oriental Institute of the University of Chicago.

Edward Chiera at Oriental Institute, Chicago, 1931.

Chiera was Annual Professor of the American Schools of Oriental Research (ASOR) at Baghdad in 1924 – 1925. At that time he conducted archaeological excavations in ancient Nuzi, near Kirkuk, Iraq, at the invitation of Gertrude Bell and sponsored by the Iraq Museum. His discovery and deciphering of the Nuzi Tablets was an important archaeological result. He traveled to Istanbul in 1924 and copied some fifty pieces of inscribed clay tablets from the Nippur collection. In the years that followed, he copied and translated more than two hundred literary tablets, among which Istanbul #2461 containing the oldest known love song and others with some of the Gilgamesh poems. This work gave scholars important new insights into Sumerian history and literature.

A pre-eminent scholar of ancient cuneiform languages, Chiera became Editor of the Chicago Assyrian Dictionary Project, a monumental work which had been started in 1921, and eventually took 85 years to complete. He was a close associate of the director and founder of the Oriental Institute, James Henry Breasted. Chiera also acted as a curator of the Museum of the Oriental Institute, and made significant acquisitions for its collections, in addition to his own discoveries.

Chiera led Oriental Institute excavations at Khorsabad, near Mosul, Iraq in 1928 - 1929, again with great success. The site of the ancient palace of King Sargon II was excavated. Valuable works of Assyrian art were recovered, including a colossal Lamassu which had guarded the entrance to the palace. He continued as field director of ASOR in 1931, in a joint expedition of ASOR and Harvard University. He was instrumental in the development of plans for the ASOR, for the Iraq Museum, and in the careers of other noted archaeologists.
