= Nuzzi =

Nuzzi is an Italian surname. Notable people with the surname include:

- Antonio Nuzzi (1926–2016), Italian Roman Catholic archbishop
- Ferdinando Nuzzi (1644–1717), Italian Roman Catholic cardinal
- Mariana Ximenes Nuzzi (born 1981), Brazilian actress
- Mario Nuzzi (1603–1673), Italian painter
- Olivia Nuzzi (born 1993), American political journalist
- Paolo Nuzzi (born 1939), Italian film director and screenwriter
