= Tell al-Fakhar =

- تل الفخار (Arabic)
- Location within Iraq Location within Near East
- 35°22′52″N 43°58′41″E
- Type: tell
- Location: Iraq, Iraq
- Region: Kirkuk Governorate

Site notes
- Height: 4.5 metre
- Length: 200 metre
- Width: 135 metre
- Excavation dates: 1967–1968; 1969
- Archaeologists: Yasin Mahmoud al-Khalesi

Tell al-Fakhar (also Tell al-Faḫar) (Arabic: تل الفخار, romanized: Tell al-Faḫḫar, lit. 'Pottery Mound') is a tell, or archaeological settlement mound, 45 kilometers southwest of the modern city of Kirkuk in Kirkuk Governorate, northeastern Iraq. Excavations revealed two occupation phases that were dated to the Mitanni/Kassite and Neo-Assyrian periods, or mid-second and early-first millennia BCE. The mid-second millennium phase consisted of a large building, dubbed the "Green Palace", where an archive of circa 800 clay tablets was found. It has been suggested that the site's name was Kurruḫanni but later researchers have called this into question.

== Location ==
The site measures 200 by 135 metres (656 by 443 ft) and is 4.5 metres (15 ft) high. It is located in an area where rainfed agriculture is possible and 2 kilometres (1.2 mi) north of the site is a wadi that carries water during the winter. There are numerous other tells in the region that show evidence for occupation from prehistoric periods up to the Islamic era. The important and contemporary site of Yorgan Tepe, ancient Nuzi, is located 25 kilometres (16 mi) east of Tell al-Fakhar.

== History ==
The excavation revealed two main occupation phases, termed Stratum II (Mitanni/Kassite; Late Bronze) and Stratum I (Neo-Assyrian; Iron Age). The proposed ancient name of Tell al-Fakhar is Kuruhanni.

=== Stratum II ===
In the Late Bronze, Stratum II belongs to the Mitanni Empire. The Green Palace is a large structure with at least 17 rooms, plastered up to six times and covered with green paint. The building had rooms in different sizes with drains and toilets, divided into private and public wings. In the public wing was a large room with benches along the walls that has been interpreted as a "reception hall" where the ruler could receive his guests. In front of the building was a large terrace paved with mudbricks.

At least 34 skeletons were found in the palace. The majority were located in 2 rooms and were associated with arrowheads and pieces of armour, suggesting that they died a violent death while defending the palace. This is also indicated by the fact that several doorways in the palace had been blocked, and that the palace was destroyed by a conflagration, as indicated by the burned walls and thick ash deposits on the floors. An archive of circa 800 clay tablets was found in the Green Palace, many of them also bearing seal impressions. Many have now been published. Because the tablets were found in all of the rooms of the palace, it has been suggested that the archive was scattered during the pillaging of the building. Other finds included pottery, gold and silver adornments, bronze armour scales, copper leaf-shaped spear and arrowheads, glazed and glass bottles and cylinder seals.

=== Stratum I ===
After the end of Stratum II, the site was abandoned for some time. The next occupation phase, Stratum I, was badly preserved. Parts of three different structures were excavated, but the walls were only preserved up to a height of three or four rows of mudbricks. In one building with rooms grouped around a courtyard, several kilns were found but their purpose is unclear. In the second building, two ovens were found while one room in the third contained a basin built of baked mudbricks. Except for pottery, no other finds were recorded from this occupation phase.

== Excavations ==
The site was excavated by the Directorate-General of Antiquities of Iraq under the direction of Yasin Mahmoud al-Khalesi during one season in the winter of 1967–1968 lasting from 22 October to 27 January. The excavation was prompted by the fact that the site was threatened by the development of an irrigation project in the region and because illegal digging activities had been carried out there, after which children had found clay tablets on the surface of the mound. A second season was carried out in 1969.

== See also ==
- Cities of the ancient Near East
