= Nuzi =

Ancient city in Mesopotamia

- Yorghan Tepe
- Location within Iraq
- 35°22′11.9″N 44°15′17.7″E
- Type: tell
- Location: Kirkuk Governorate, Iraq
- Region: Mesopotamia

Site notes
- Excavation dates: 1925-1931
- Archaeologists: Edward Chiera, Robert Pfeiffer, Richard Starr

Nuzi (Hurrian Nuzi/Nuzu; Akkadian Gasur) at modern Yorghan Tepe (also Yorgan Tepa and Jorgan Tepe), Iraq was an ancient Mesopotamian city 12 kilometers southwest of the city of Arrapḫa (modern Kirkuk) and 70 kilometers southwest of Sātu Qala, located near the Tigris river. It was occupied from the Ubaid period in the 5th millennium BC until late in the 2nd millennium BC then, after a period of abandonment, in the Parthian era. It reached major importance in the Akkadian Empire period when it was known as Gasur and again in the Mitanni period when its name was Nuzi.

== History ==
The site has about 15 occupational layers with 12 major strata several of which have subdivisions. The majority of excavation work at the site was on the Late Bronze Age levels with only some soundings to the older strata. Traces of Parthian era occupation were found on the surface.

=== Late Chalcolithic ===
Pottery sherds were found from the Halaf/Ubaid periods. In the Uruk period levels mudbrick construction occurred and finds included spouted vessels, bevel-rimmed bowls, a small copper animal figurine and a cache of drilled marble stamp and cylinder seals.

=== Early Bronze ===
Early dynastic pottery was found in one pit, from pavements and graves, with no interruption with the following Akkadian Empire occupation.

==== Akkadian Period ====
During the Akkadian Empire (c. 2334-2154 BC), the city was probably known as Gasur. There is some debate about whether the city name was Ga-sur^{ki} or Ga-sag^{ki}. It was a provincial seat of a governor known from a clay sealing reading: "Itbe-labba, govern[or] of Gasur" found at Tell Brak in modern Syria. 222 Akkadian Empire period (c. 2334–2154 BC) cuneiform tablets were found at the site. They are primarily dated to the time of rulers Naram-Sin and Shar-kali-sharri and written in Old Akkadian. A school tablet mentioned Tuṭṭanabšum, daughter of Naram-Sin. Finds at this level included stone figurines, a copper axe and copper daggers, a shell seal mounted on a copper pin, and 5 cylinder seals. Gasur had strong trading contacts with a number of cities including Assur, Sabum, Susa, and the city of Akkad.

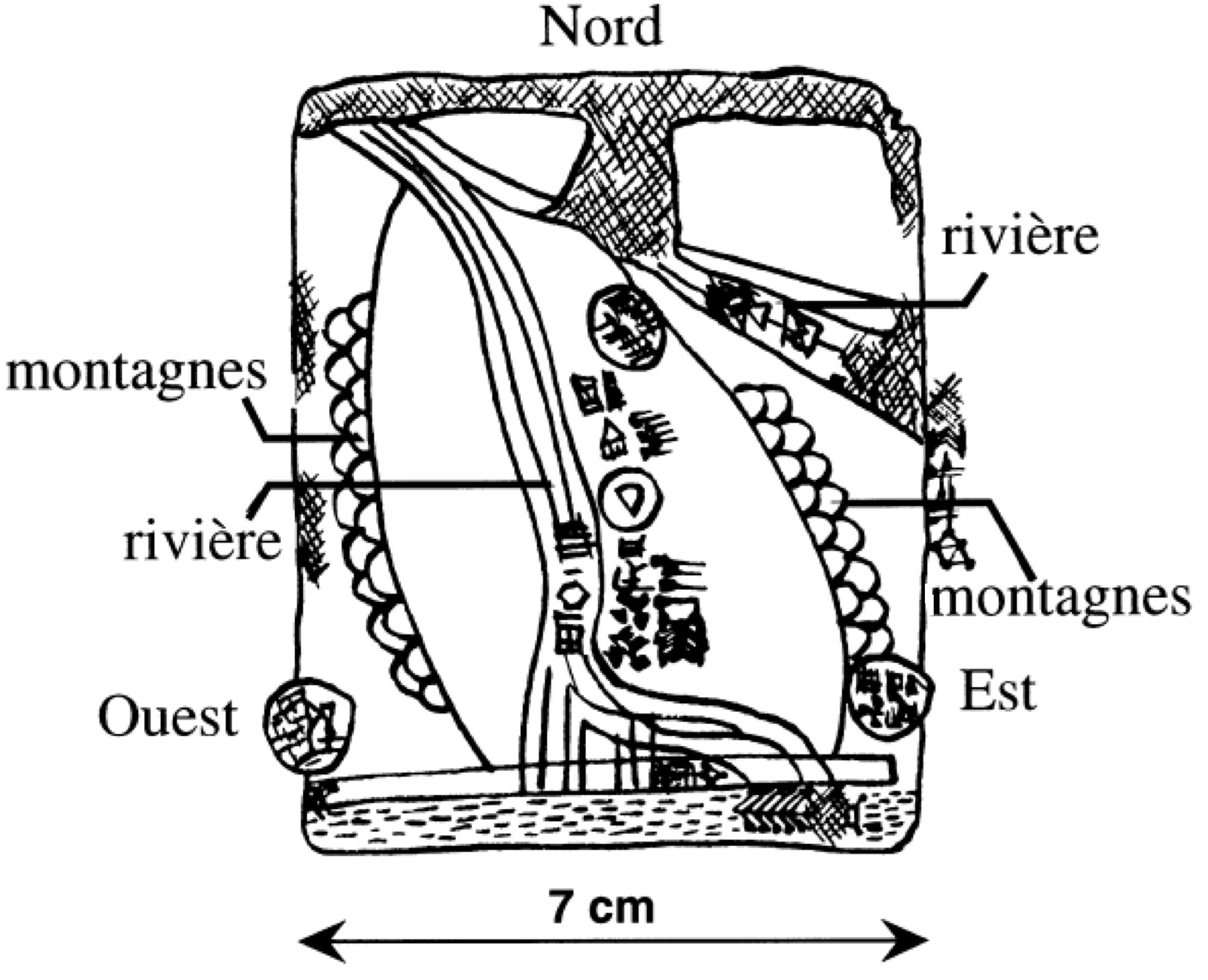
Sketch of the Nuzi map

The most famous item found at this level is the Nuzi map, the oldest known map discovered. Although the majority of the tablet is preserved, it is unknown exactly what the Nuzi map shows. The Nuzi map is actually one of the so-called Gasur texts, and predates destruction by fire of the city at this end of the Early Bronze Age. Gasur was a thriving commercial center, and the texts reveal a diverse business community with far-reaching commercial activities. It is possible that Ebla was a trading partner, and that the tablet, rather than a record of land-holdings, might indeed be a road map. The tablet, which is approximately 6 centimeters by 6.5 centimeters, is inscribed only on the obverse. It shows the city of Maskan-dur-ebla in the lower left corner, as well as a canal/river and two mountain ranges. The area below the Rahium river is labeled "20(bur) – 1(eše) of irrigated gardens, belonging to Azala".

==== Ur III Period ====
A stone plaque, of uncertain original provenance, was found at the temple of Istar at Assur reading "Ititi, the ruler, son of Ininlaba, dedicated (this object) from the booty of Gasur to the goddess Istar". Alternative reading of the inscription has Inanna vs Istar. The city name is written as Ga-sag^{ki} vs the Ga-sur^{ki} found at Gasur. The father's name means "Innin is a lion" (Innin is another name of Inanna) and is known from a text found at Yorghan Tepe. The name of Ititi is also found in 5 Yorghan Tepe texts. The city of Assur is also mentioned in those texts, once in the same form as the Ititi inscription. The sign forms have been dated to either the Akkadian period or shortly thereafter. An Ititi was appointed as governor of the northern province at Kazallu by Ur III ruler Shulgi (c. 2094–2046 BC). With the uncertainty on the degree of overlap between the Ur III empire and Akkadian Empire it is unclear if this is the same person.

=== Middle Bronze ===
The site was occupied to a lesser extent in the Ur III, Isin-Larsa, and Old Babylonian periods following a sack of the city. The relevant deposits were thick but without architectural remains. A few cuneiform tablets from this era were found.

=== Late Bronze ===
==== Mitanni Period ====
In the middle of the second millennium the Hurrians gained control of the town and renamed it Nuzi. The history of the site during the intervening period is unclear, though the presence of a few cuneiform tablets from Assyria indicates that trade with nearby Assur was taking place.

After the fall of the Hurrian kingdom of Mitanni Nuzi went into gradual decline. Note that while the Hurrian period is well known from full excavation of those strata, the earlier history is not as reliable because of less substantive digging. The history of Nuzi is closely interrelated with that of the nearby towns of Eshnunna and Khafajah.

==== Nuzi, a provincial town in the 14th century BC ====
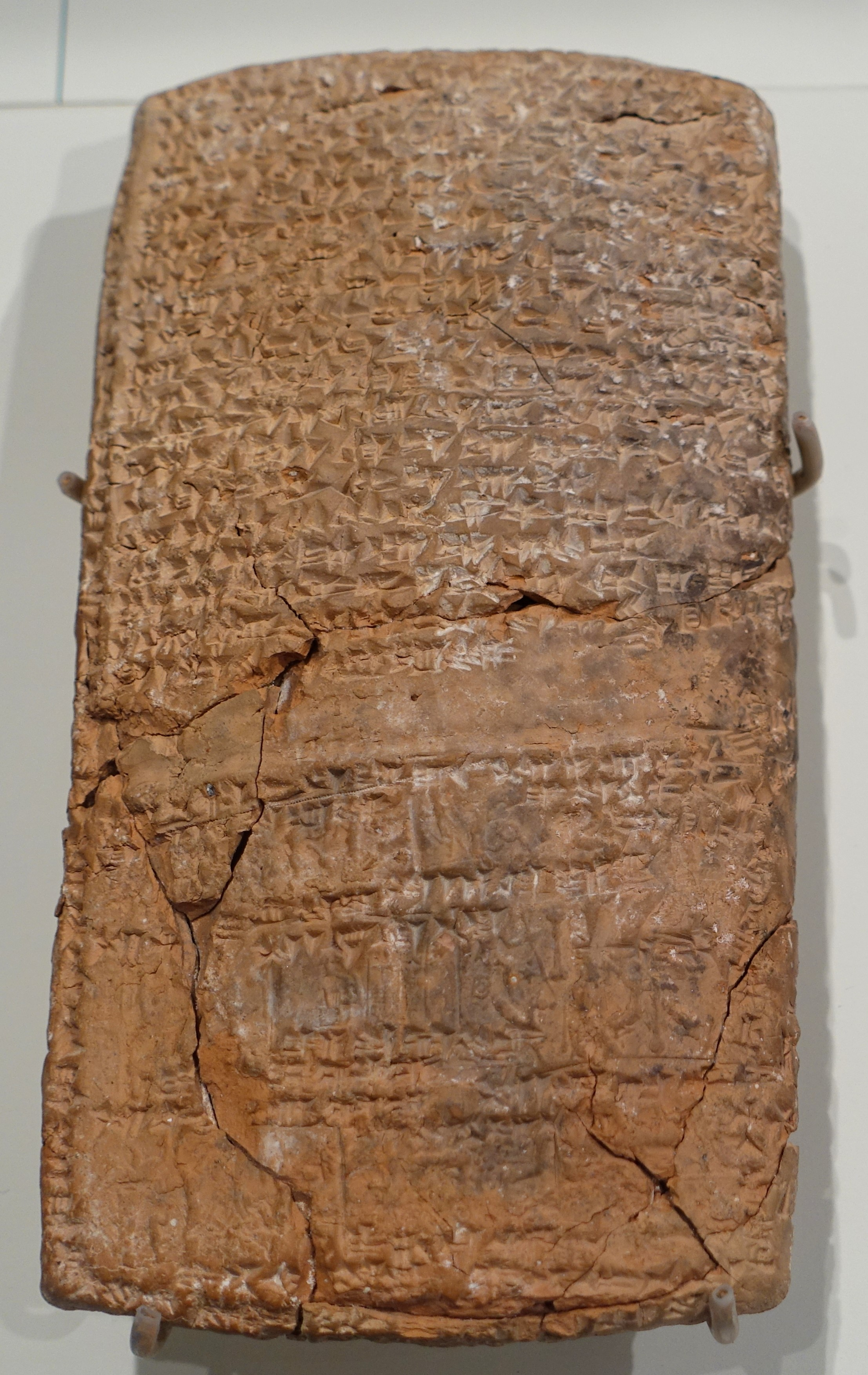
Tablet from Nuzi: legal dispute over land.

The best-known period in the history of Yorghan Tepe is by far one of the city of Nuzi in the 15th-14th centuries BC. At this time the central complex contained two temples (to Šawuška/Ištar and Teššub) and a palace. The tablets of this period indicate that Nuzi was a small provincial town of northern Mesopotamia at this time in an area populated mostly by Hurrians. Despite the presence of two temples most votive activity at Nuzi in this period is that of household religions with elements of ancestor worship where the eldest son inherits the family cult statue. Usually the tablets of Yorghan Tepe, Kirkuk, and Tell al-Faḫḫar are grouped together under banner of Nuzi tablets. Only 0.18% of tablets contained a date formula of any kind, generally local. They can, however, be chronologically ordered by internal clues such as the names of officials and prosopographical data.

==== Administration ====
Nuzi was a provincial town of Arrapḫa. It was administered by a governor (šaknu) from the palace. The tripartite palace, situated in the center of the mound, had many rooms arranged around a central courtyard. The functions of some of those rooms have been identified: reception areas, apartments, offices, kitchens, stores. The walls were painted, as was seen in fragments unearthed in the ruins of the building.

Archives that have been exhumed tell us about the royal family, as well as the organization of the internal administration of the palace and its dependencies, and the payments various workers received. Junior officers of the royal administration had such titles as sukkallu (often translated as "vizier", the second governor), "district manager" (halṣuhlu), and "mayor" (hazannu). Justice was rendered by these officers, but also by judges (dayānu) installed in the districts. Free subjects of the state were liable to a conscription, the Ilku, which consisted of a requirement to perform various types of military and civilian services, such as working the land.

== Archaeology ==
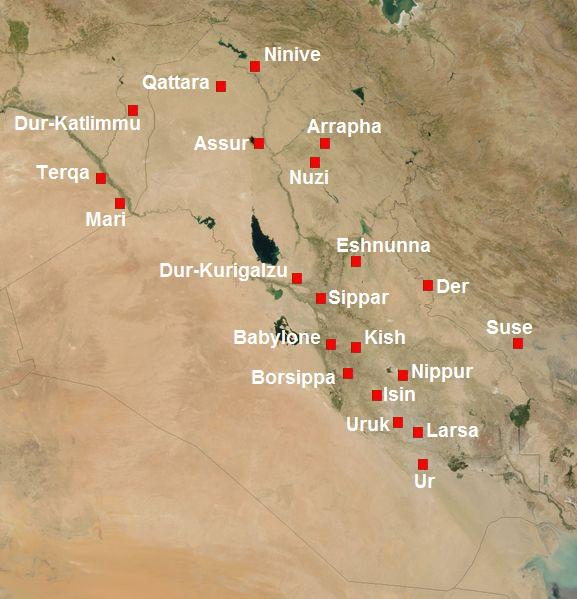
Mesopotamia - 2nd millennium BC

The site has a roughly square 200 meter by 200 meter main mound which was protected by a city wall. Only a small portion of the wall was excavated but gates are apparent by deep wadis in the northeast, southwest, and southeast. The city's main road, well drained, ran from the northeast gate to the southwest gate, separating the central temples and palace. A secondary road led from the southeast gate to join the main road. A number of private homes were excavated 200 meters north of the main mound on two small rises. Originally thought to be extramural residences it is now believed, partly on textual evidence, that there was an outer town with its own wall, now destroyed by modern agriculture.

The excavators defined a number of occupation strata. The Nuzi occupation lasted several centuries and its chronology is slightly disputed. The excavators dated Stratum II, the destruction of the city, at c. 1500 BC. Later work has proposed a more recent date of c. 1430-1330 BC. The stratigraphy is complicated because the excavators defined these main strata, "pavements", from a few deep soundings while specifying levels A through G for the temple and a different strata I—VIII for the northwest ridge and the southeast edge of the mound. The only correlation given was Temple A equals sounding Stratum I and "edge" Stratum II.

- Stratum I - Nuzi Post-Destruction level
- Stratum II - Nuzi Destruction level
- Stratum III - IV - Nuzi
- Stratum V - VII - Gasur/Nuzi transition, Lagash II to Old Babylonian
- Stratum VIII - IX - Gasur, Akkadian Empire, c. 2334–2154 BC
- Stratum X - XII - Prehistoric

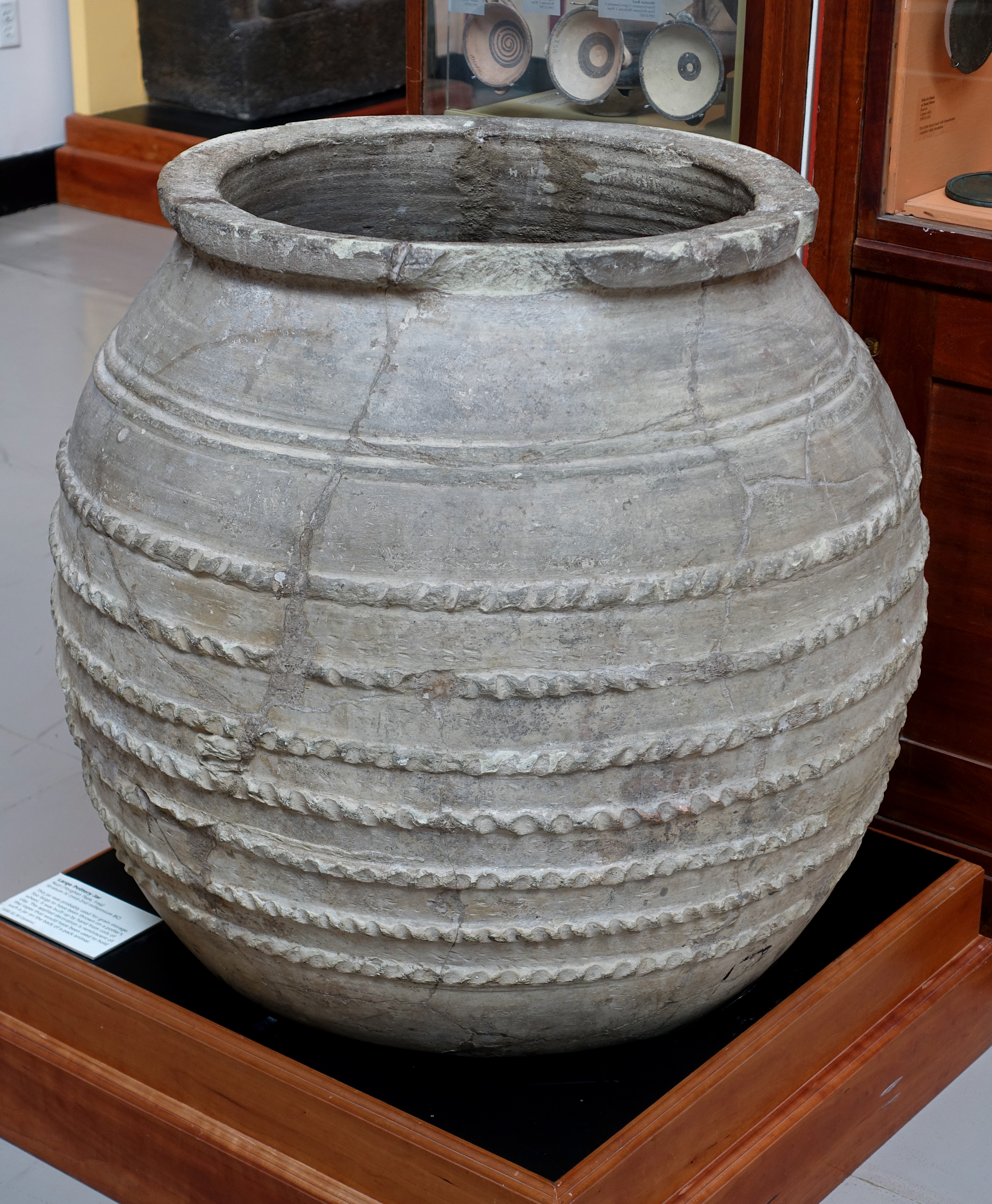
Large pottery jar, Nuzi, Yorghan Tepe, Iraq, Stratum IV, mid 2nd millennium BC - Harvard Semitic Museum

While tablets from Yorghan Tepe began appearing back as far as 1896, the first serious archaeological efforts began in 1925 after Gertrude Bell noticed tablets appearing in the markets of Baghdad. The dig was mainly worked by Edward Chiera, Robert Pfeiffer, and Richard Starr under the auspices of the Iraq Museum and the Baghdad School of the American Schools of Oriental Research and later the Harvard University and Fogg Art Museum. Excavations continued through 1931 with the site showing 15 occupation levels. A number of soundings were conducted at the prehistoric site of Kudis Sagïr about five kilometers to the south. The hundreds of tablets and other finds recovered were published in a series of volumes with ongoing publications.

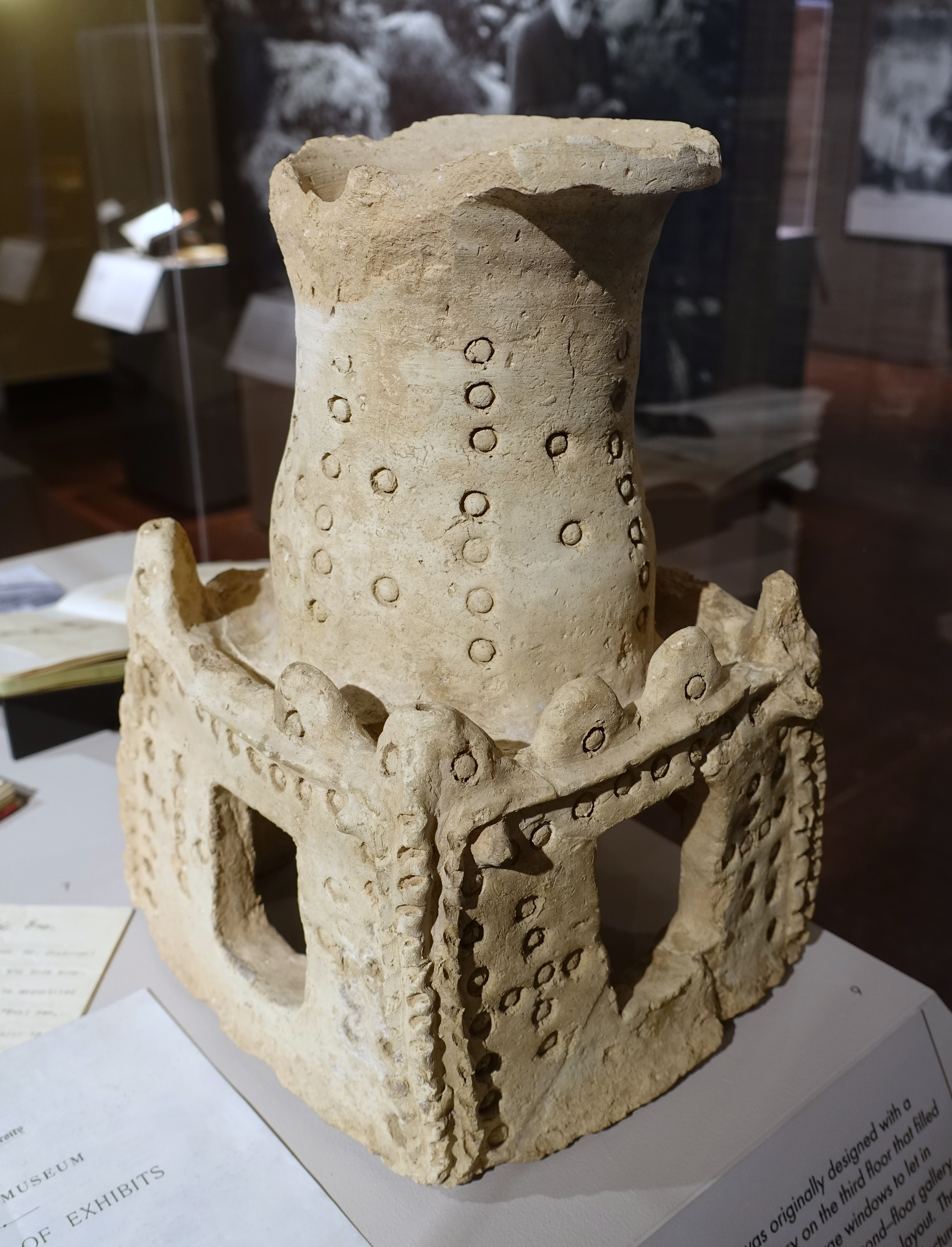
House-shaped offering stand, Yorghan Tepe, ancient Nuzi, Iraq, Stratum II, ceramic - Harvard Semitic Museum

To date, around 5,000 tablets are known, mostly held at the Oriental Institute, the Harvard Semitic Museum and the Iraq Museum in Baghdad. Those from Gasur are written in the Akkadian language while though from Nuzi are in a Hurrian influenced dialect of Akkadian. Many are routine legal and business documents with about one quarter concerning the business transactions of a single family, found the homes of Tehip-tilla and Surki-tilla on the northwest rise. The vast majority of finds come from the Hurrian period during the second millennium BC with the remainder dating back to the town's founding during the Akkadian Empire. A discovered sealing read "Saustatar, son of Parsatatar (Baratarna), king of Mitani" (the Mitanni Empire). An archive contemporary with the Hurrian archive at Nuzi has been excavated from the "Green Palace" at the site of Tell al-Fakhar, 35 kilometres (22 mi) southwest of Nuzi.

The temple area had seven occupation levels, Temple G (Gasur), Temple F (Gasur/Nuzi transition), and Temples A-E (Nuzi). Temple G was a single shrine which in Temple F was transformed into a double shrine. Temple A was contemporary with the Stratum II destruction level. All were of the "bent-axis" type. In the temple area a number of bronze objects were found, including a statue carved in the round, 9 sickles, 2 sun-discs, 2 crescents, 6 pins, 1 bell, 2 bracelets, and hundreds of small beads. One sickle was inscribed with "An. Ud. Za." and the sun-discs were 12 centimeters in diameter with "a circular depression(about 4 cm. across) surrounded by a circle of raised dots; around this center is a six-pointed star".

=== Nuzi ware ===
In 1948, archaeologist Max Mallowan called attention to the unusual pottery he found at Nuzi, associated with the Mitanni period. This became known as the Nuzi ware. Subsequently, this highly artistic pottery was identified all over in the Upper Mesopotamia.

== See also ==
- List of cities of the ancient Near East
- Nuzi texts
