= List of anonymously published works =

List of texts by unknown or deliberately unnamed writers

Throughout the history of literature, since the creation of bound texts in the forms of books and codices, various works have been published and written anonymously, often due to their political or controversial nature, or merely for the purposes of the privacy of their authors, among other reasons. This article provides a list of literary works published anonymously, either explicitly attributed to "Anonymous", or published with no specific author's name given.

A work that is published anonymously differs from works published under a pseudonym.

Not included in this list are works which predate the advent of publishing and general attribution of authorship, such as ancient written inscriptions (such as hieroglyphic or pictographical, transcribed texts), certain historical folklore and myths of oral traditions now published as text, and reference or plain texts (letters, notes, graffiti) recovered archaeologically, which are otherwise unimportant to literary studies. Religious texts and grimoires, which are often written anonymously, may appear, along with works initially written anonymously whose authors are now known.

This list is ordered alphabetically by title.

== Works predating the Common Era ==
=== Ancient Mesopotamian works ===
- Debate between bird and fish
- Enûma Eliš
- Hurrian hymn to Nikkal
- Inscriptions at Tell Abu Salabikh
  - Instructions of Shuruppak, attributed to the historically debatable Shuruppak
- Kesh Temple Hymn
- Mesopotamian City Laments
  - Lament for Ur
  - Lament for Sumer and Ur
  - Lament for Nippur
  - Lament for Eridu
  - Lament for Uruk
- Eridu Genesis

=== Ancient Egyptian works ===
- Ancient Egyptian funerary texts
  - Coffin Texts
  - New Kingdom funerary texts
    - Book of the Dead
    - Amduat
    - Spell of the Twelve Caves
    - The Book of Gates
    - Book of the Netherworld
    - Book of Caverns
    - Book of the Earth
    - Litany of Re
    - Book of the Heavens
  - Pyramid Texts
- Ancient Egyptian medical papyri

=== Ancient Greek works ===
- Marble
  - Seikilos epitaph

=== Other works ===
- I Ching
- The Aesop Romance

== Early classics ==
- Cantar de Mio Cid
- Beowulf
- De Dubiis Nominibus
- Dresden Codex
- Sir Gawain and the Green Knight
- The Second Shepherds' Play
- "Enchiriadis" texts
  - Scolica enchiriadis
  - Musica enchiriadis
- The Battle of Maldon
- Diaries of Court Ladies of Old Japan
- Gesta Hungarorum
- The Secret History of the Mongols
- St. Erkenwald
- Corpus Hermeticum
- Poetic Edda
- The Lady of Escalot
- One Thousand and One Nights

== 15th century ==
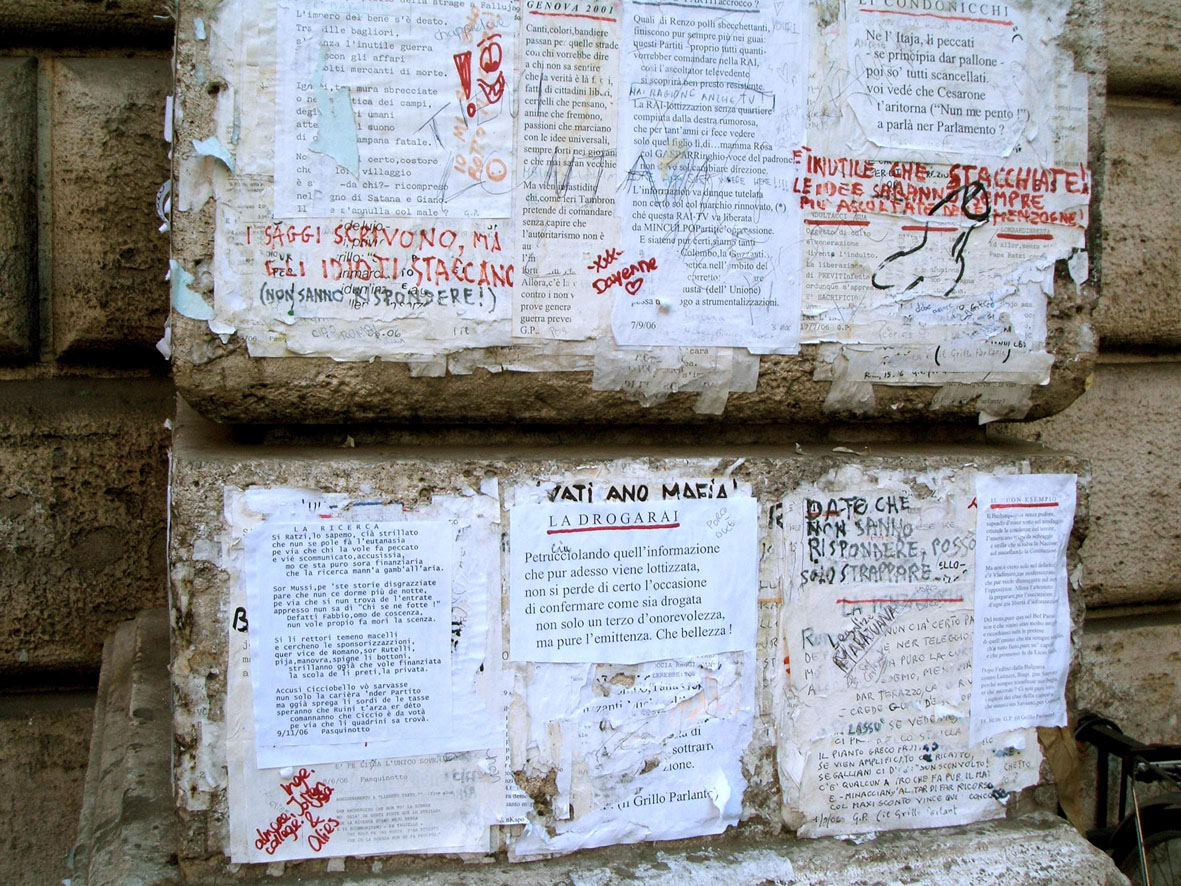
Modern pasquinades glued to the Pasquino statue in Rome.

- The Book of Dede Korkut
- The pasquinades (satirical poems) glued to the Talking Statues of Rome. They still appear from time to time.
- The Key of Solomon
- The Skibby Chronicle
- La Farce de maître Pierre Pathelin
- Hypnerotomachia Poliphili, published anonymously at the time, now considered likely to have been written by Francesco Colonna
- The Voynich manuscript

== 16th century ==
- Narrative of Some Things of New Spain and of the Great City of Temestitan
- Lazarillo de Tormes
- Chilam Balam

== 17th century ==
- Actio Curiosa
- Theophrastus redivivus
- The entire catalog of Pierre Marteau
- All works published after 1788 by Sylvain Maréchal
- Vertue Rewarded

== 18th century ==
- An Essay on the Principle of Population by T.R. Malthus, originally published anonymously
- Anti-Machiavel by Frederick the Great, originally published anonymously
- Dream of the Red Chamber by Cao Xueqin, originally published anonymously
- The Sorrows of Yamba by Hannah More, originally published anonymously
- Common Sense (pamphlet) by Thomas Paine, originally published anonymously
- Primitive Cookery
- Remarks on Cruelty to Animals
- The Animated Skeleton
- The Cavern of Death

== 19th century ==
- Frankenstein by Mary Shelley, originally published anonymously
- A Brief Inquiry into the Natural Rights of Man
- American Writers by John Neal, attributed to X.Y.Z.
- A Strange Manuscript Found in a Copper Cylinder by James De Mille, originally published anonymously.
- Democracy by Henry Adams, originally published anonymously.
- Brother Jonathan: or, the New Englanders by John Neal, published anonymously.
- Elizabeth and Her German Garden by Elizabeth von Arnim, originally published anonymously.
- Fantasmagoriana by Jean-Baptiste Benoît Eyriès, published anonymously.
- Logan by John Neal
- Memoirs of a Russian Princess
- Might is Right, published under the pseudonym "Ragnar Redbeard". The most commonly claimed authors are Arthur Desmond or Jack London.
- Romance of Lust, originally published anonymously but variously attributed to Edward Sellon or William Simpson Potter
- Seventy-Six by John Neal, attributed to "the author of Logan"
- Supernatural Religion: An Inquiry into the Reality of Divine Revelation by Walter Richard Cassels, originally published anonymously.
- Tales of the Dead, translated by Sarah Elizabeth Utterson, published anonymously.
- Tamerlane and Other Poems, the first published collection of poems by Edgar Allan Poe, originally published anonymously.
- The Log-Cabin Lady
- The Princess Ilsée
- The String of Pearls
- The Way of a Pilgrim
- The Great Organ in the Boston Music Hall
- Under the Greenwood Tree by Thomas Hardy, originally published anonymously.
- Vestiges of the Natural History of Creation by Robert Chambers (publisher, born 1802), as only revealed after his death

== 20th century ==
- Jack Pots by Eugene Edwards published in 1900 by Jamieson-Higgins. A collection of poker stories. Author is believed to be another pseudonym of S. W. Erdnase.
- The Autobiography of a Flea, erotic novel published in 1901.
- The Expert at the Card Table by S. W. Erdnase, a book on sleight-of-hand with cards for card advantage play and magic, self-published in 1902 in Chicago.
- Josefine Mutzenbacher, erotic novel published in 1906, presumably written by Felix Salten.
- The Autobiography of an Ex-Colored Man, the story of a young biracial man, was published anonymously in 1912 by James Weldon Johnson who revealed himself as the author in 1927.
- The Strange Death of Adolf Hitler, anonymously written 1939 book which claims that Adolf Hitler died in 1938 and was subsequently impersonated by look-alikes.
- Go Ask Alice, now known to have been written by Beatrice Sparks.
- A Woman in Berlin, an anonymous diary detailing experiences of a German woman as Germany is defeated in World War II.
- Primary Colors, published anonymously. Journalist Joe Klein was immediately suspected as the author. He originally denied it, but admitted authorship within six months.

== 21st century ==
- Bourbon Kid – ongoing supernatural horror series first published in 2000
- The Bride Stripped Bare – erotic novel published in 2003; soon after, the author was revealed as the Australian writer Nikki Gemmell.
- Through Our Enemies' Eyes: Osama Bin Laden, Radical Islam and the Future of America (2003) and Imperial Hubris: Why the West is Losing the War on Terror (2004) – both revealed to have been written by former CIA employee Michael Scheuer.
- Recipes for Disaster: An Anarchist Cookbook (2004) – published by the CrimethInc. collective.
- My Immortal (2006–2007) – work of fiction settled in the Harry Potter universe involving goth subculture which has become a cult phenomenon.
- Rolling Thunder (2005–2014) – eleven issues of "an anarchist journal of dangerous living" published by the CrimethInc collective.
- Diary of an Oxygen Thief (2006) – Dutch novel about the independent art, literature, and music scene in Brooklyn, New York.
- O: A Presidential Novel (2011) – ISBN 978-1-4516-2596-7, speculative novel about President Barack Obama's 2012 re-election campaign. The publishers, Simon & Schuster, claim that the book was written by someone who was "in the room" with the President.
- Lucy in the Sky (2012)
- Letting Ana Go (2013) – anonymous diary of an anorexic teenager, was published by Simon and Schuster with no discernible author.
- The Incest Diary (2017)
- A Warning (2019) – book written by "a senior Trump administration official" that expands upon the anonymous 2018 essay I Am Part of the Resistance Inside the Trump Administration from The New York Times. In the week before the 2020 election, Miles Taylor, indeed a senior Trump official, revealed himself as the author of both the book and original essay.

== See also ==
- Anonymity
  - Anonymity application
  - Anonymous blogging
  - Anonymous P2P
  - Anonymous remailer
  - Anonymous web browsing
- Anonymous work
  - Notname
  - List of anonymous masters
  - List of works published under a pseudonym
