= Aachener Chronik =

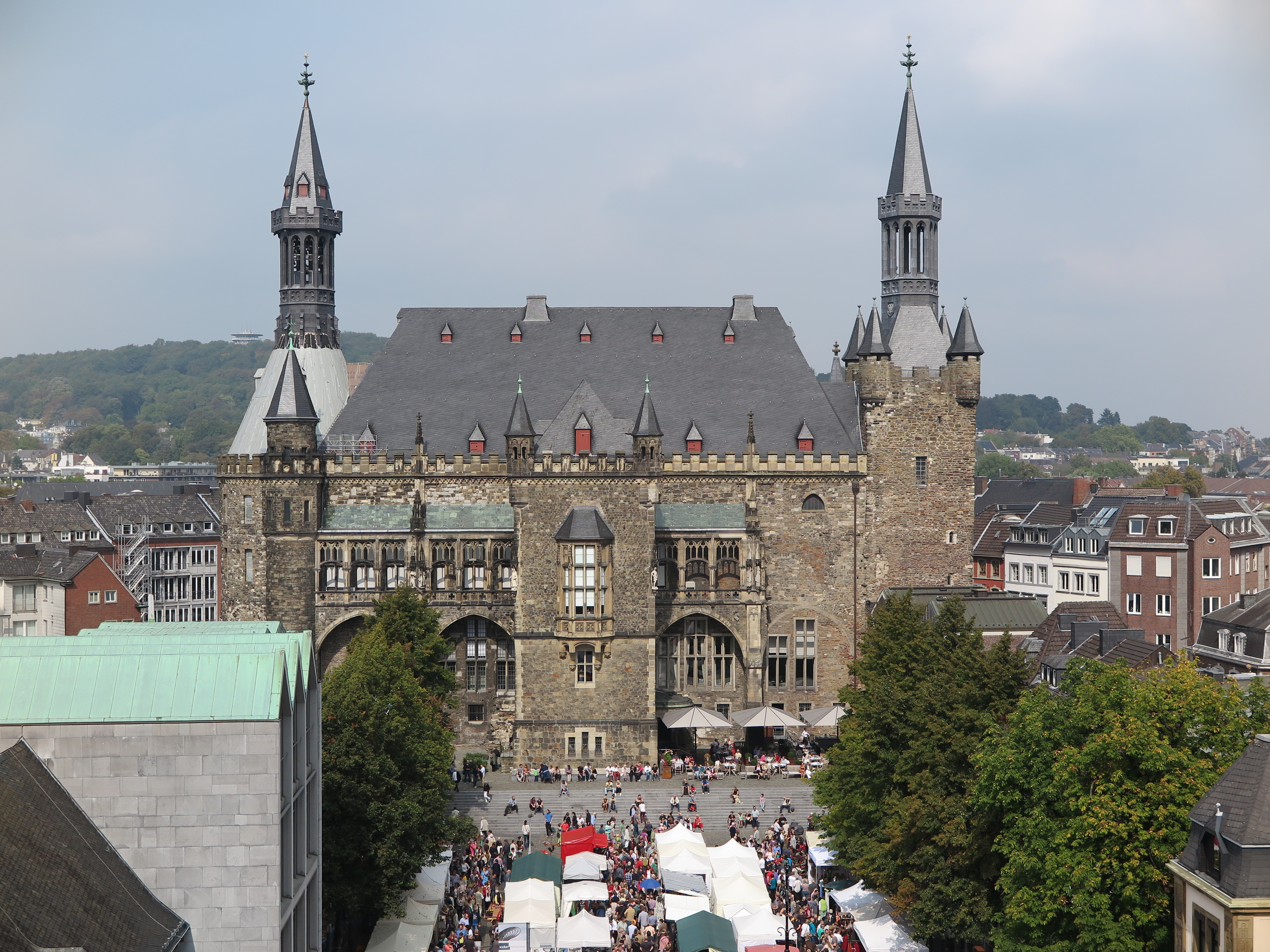
Aachen Town Hall

Aachener Chronik is a town chronicle dated to the late 15th century.

The chronicle is written in High German, although some portions of the earlier chapters use Low German references. The document is anonymous but was probably commissioned by the Aachen town council. It consists of annual entries from 770 to 1482.

The first four centuries of the annual comprise only 13 brief entries, while from 1428 the entries become longer narrative units.
