= I Am Part of the Resistance Inside the Trump Administration =

2018 anonymous essay

- The graphic published along with the essay
- Author: Published anonymously (later revealed to be Miles Taylor)
- Language: English
- Genre: Op-ed
- Published in: The New York Times
- Publication date: September 5, 2018
- Publication place: United States
- Media type: Newspaper
- Website: www.nytimes.com/2018/09/05/opinion/trump-white-house-anonymous-resistance.html

"I Am Part of the Resistance Inside the Trump Administration" is an anonymous essay published by The New York Times on September 5, 2018. The author was described as a senior Trump administration official. About a week before the 2020 United States presidential election, Miles Taylor, who had been deputy chief of staff to the Department of Homeland Security's secretary Kirstjen Nielsen when writing the essay, revealed himself as the author. The op-ed criticizes Donald Trump and states that many current members of the administration deliberately undermine his suggestions and orders for the good of the country. It also states that some cabinet members in the early days of the administration discussed using the Twenty-fifth Amendment to the United States Constitution as a way to remove the president from power.

The New York Times editorial board said that it knew the author's identity but granted the person anonymity to protect him from reprisal. The publication of this editorial was unusual because few New York Times pieces have been anonymously written. Trump expressed outrage at the content of the editorial and called for an investigation to determine who authored the editorial. The author's identity drew much speculation in the media, with over thirty administration officials denying their involvement. On November 19, 2019, a little over a year after publishing the editorial, Taylor went on to publish the book A Warning, also anonymously.

== Political environment ==
The essay was published on September 5, 2018. During the week that the article was published, the book Fear: Trump in the White House by political author Bob Woodward was being promoted in the media ahead of its September 11, 2018, release date. Woodward's book depicts the Trump administration as being engulfed in chaos and internal opposition to Trump's impulses. The day before the essay's publication, the US Senate Committee on the Judiciary began public hearings on controversial US Supreme Court candidate Brett Kavanaugh. The timing was two months prior to the 2018 US elections and has been questioned as a possible calculated diversion, although The New York Times editorial board denied this. The essay praised US Senator John McCain, whose death occurred eleven days prior to its publication.

== Contents ==
The author of the essay writes that they and many of their colleagues deliberately fail to follow some directives from the president when they feel the proposal would be bad for the country, "working diligently" to block his "worst inclinations". The author writes: "The root of the problem is the president's amorality. Anyone who works with him knows he is not moored to any discernible first principles that guide his decision making." The author expresses support for a traditional Republican Party platform, particularly the Tax Cuts and Jobs Act of 2017, while disagreeing strongly with the foreign policy of the first Donald Trump administration, and taking pride in colleagues' efforts to shift that policy in regard to Russia. The paper's editorial page editor summarized the column's perspective as that of "a conservative explaining why they felt that even if working for the Trump administration meant compromising some principles, it ultimately served the country if they could achieve some of the president's policy objectives while helping resist some of his worst impulses". The author disavowed any resemblance to the deep state conspiracy theory, saying: "This isn't the work of the so-called deep state. It's the work of the steady state."

== Identity of the author ==
There was much speculation about the identity of "Anonymous". The New York Times said that they were working with a single author, not a group of officials, and that the text was lightly edited by them but not for the purpose of obscuring the author's identity. They said that the definition of "senior administration official" was used in regular practice by journalists to describe "positions in the upper echelon of an administration, such as the one held by this writer".

The newspaper's editorial page editor, op-ed editor, and publisher knew the identity of the author. Patrick Healy, the newspaper's politics editor, said that no identifying information had been leaked to The New York Times's newsroom. The agreement between the newspaper's editorial department and the author did not prevent the newspaper's news department from investigating the identity of the author.

According to James Dao, the paper's editorial page editor, the author was introduced to them by a trusted intermediary, and the author's identity was verified by background checking and direct communication. Dao said the use of a vaguely described anonymous identity was believed to be necessary to protect the author from reprisal, "and that concern has been borne out by the president's reaction to the essay". In response to a reader's question about whether the paper might have to reveal the author's name, Dao replied: "We intend to do everything in our power to protect the identity of the writer and have great confidence that the government cannot legally force us to reveal it."

Several theories about who wrote the op-ed were offered. Some theories looked at which administration officials have a record of using certain words that appear in the essay. Specifically, the theories focused on the use of steady state, lodestar, and first principles. Some offshore bookmakers took bets on who the anonymous author was, with Vice President Mike Pence being the favorite at one site, while then-Attorney General Jeff Sessions led the field at another.

More than thirty administration officials, including the actual author Miles Taylor, denied authoring the editorial:

- Alexander Acosta, Secretary of Labor
- Alex Azar, Secretary of Health and Human Services
- John R. Bolton, National Security Advisor
- Ben Carson, Secretary of Housing and Urban Development
- Elaine Chao, Secretary of Transportation
- Dan Coats, Director of National Intelligence
- Kellyanne Conway, Presidential Counselor
- Betsy DeVos, Secretary of Education
- Zachary Fuentes, deputy chief of staff
- Nikki Haley, Ambassador to the United Nations
- Gina Haspel, Director of the CIA
- Kevin Hassett, Chairman of the Council of Economic Advisors
- Sarah Huckabee Sanders, White House Press Secretary
- Jon Huntsman Jr., Ambassador to Russia
- Larry Kudlow, Director of the National Economic Council
- Robert Lighthizer, Trade Representative
- Jim Mattis, Secretary of Defense
- Don McGahn, White House Counsel
- Linda McMahon, Administrator of the Small Business Administration
- Steven Mnuchin, Secretary of the Treasury
- Mick Mulvaney, Director of the Office of Management and Budget
- Kirstjen Nielsen, Secretary of Homeland Security
- Ajit Pai, Chairman of the Federal Communications Commission
- Mike Pence, Vice President of the United States
- Sonny Perdue, Secretary of Agriculture
- Rick Perry, Secretary of Energy
- Mike Pompeo, Secretary of State
- Wilbur Ross, Secretary of Commerce
- Jeff Sessions, Attorney General
- Raj Shah, White House Principal Deputy Press Secretary
- Joseph Simons, Chairman of the Federal Trade Commission
- Miles Taylor, chief of staff to former Homeland Security secretary Kirstjen Nielsen
- Melania Trump, First Lady of the United States
- Andrew R. Wheeler, Acting Administrator of the Environmental Protection Agency
- Robert Wilkie, Secretary of Veterans Affairs
- Christopher A. Wray, Director of the Federal Bureau of Investigation
- Ryan Zinke, Secretary of the Interior

US Senator Rand Paul suggested that the president force members of his administration to take polygraph examinations. Presidential advisers considered polygraph exams as well as requiring officials to sign sworn affidavits. Reports surfaced that the administration came up with a list of about a dozen people who are suspected to have authored the editorial. By September 7, Trump said that the US Department of Justice should open an investigation to determine who wrote the essay; however, the Justice Department would only be able to open an investigation if it is determined that the editorial publicized classified information in the United States.

On October 28, 2020, Taylor came forward as "Anonymous".

== Reactions ==
Trump responds to the news of the anonymous essay.

=== Trump ===
According to "aides and allies" quoted anonymously by NBC News, President Trump's private reaction to the anonymous op-ed was "volcanic". Via Twitter, he stated that the author was "failing" and "probably here for all the wrong reasons". He also questioned whether the aide was another "phony source" invented by the "failing New York Times", tweeting: "If the GUTLESS anonymous person does indeed exist, the Times must, for National Security purposes, turn him/her over to government at once!" He later tweeted: "TREASON?"

=== Other politicians ===
White House press secretary Sarah Huckabee Sanders called the author a "coward" and said that they should resign. Some Democrats, including Robby Mook and Peter Daou, criticized the author for not doing enough to stop Trump. US Representative Jimmy Gomez commended the author for speaking out against the president but criticized them for maintaining anonymity, saying: "This is the problem with a lot of Republicans, including in the House: they privately say he's wrong, but they don't do anything about it." Former president Barack Obama warned that the op-ed should be viewed as a sign of "dangerous times" rather than as a source of comfort, criticizing the actions of the author as undemocratic.

=== Media ===
Political scientist Elizabeth N. Saunders commented that while it is accurate that staff within administrations often push back on the sitting president's views and that staff leak things to the press, the extent to which senior advisers within the Trump administration push back against him is "essentially unprecedented". Cato Institute scholar Julian Sanchez questioned the author's motives, believing that the editorial would make Trump "even more paranoid" and cause capable staffers to be succeeded by "loyalist nuts and/or Trump family members". Dan Gillmor, a technology writer at Arizona State University, dismissed the essay as "an act of trolling." Margaret Sullivan of The Washington Post called it "an exercise in ego" and criticized its "turgid prose" but ultimately agreed with the decision to publish it. Former George W. Bush speechwriter David Frum chastised the author for staying anonymous and warned that the essay would increase Trump's paranoia: "Things will be worse after this piece. They will be worse because of this piece." Slate published a satirical response essay titled "I Am Part of the Police Department Inside This Bank Robbery".

== Followup book ==
On October 22, 2019, the anonymous author wrote a book about his experiences inside the White House; it was released on November 19, 2019, to mixed reviews.

== See also ==
- List of anonymously published works
- The New York Times anonymous publications
- Primary Colors, a political novel originally published anonymously
