= Lucy in the Sky (novel) =

2012 young adult novel

- First edition
- Author: Anonymous
- Language: English
- Genre: young adult coming-of-age
- Publisher: Simon and Schuster Books for Young Readers
- Publication date: 2012
- Publication place: United States
- ISBN: 9781442451858 (paperback edition)
- OCLC: 1056740433

Lucy in the Sky is a 2012 book about a Santa Monica middle-class girl who suffers from drug addiction and alcoholism, much to the horror of her preppy brother, Cam, who is torn between loyalty and fear for her safety. The book was published anonymously with no discernible author. Released under various imprints of Simon and Schuster, the book received largely negative reviews from critics, being compared to older predecessor Go Ask Alice, which was also about drug addiction but set more-so around LSD and hippie counterculture. Lucy in the Sky is set in the modern 2000s era.

== Plot ==
An unnamed teenage diarist recalls living with her middle-class parents and preppy brother in Santa Monica; the diarist's only friend is her brother, Cam, who receives more admiration and hopes to go to University of California, Berkeley after high school. The two siblings, nevertheless, are close companions and share a bond by attending yoga classes. Yoga class is where the diarist meets Ross, another teenager who shares drugs with the diarist not long after her 16th birthday, during a party for said birthday. Ross remains her friend, but gets her hooked on drugs and later alcohol, leading the diarist to experiment with numerous illicit substances including marijuana, cocaine and other things. She claims to experience vivid high periods complemented by hallucinations, which only makes her even more fascinated with druggie culture and an edgy crowd of high school kids who all partake in substance abuse. The diarist stops attending school, and Cam, who has no interest in drugs, grapples with his loyalty to his sister versus the desire to report her behaviour to their parents. A 20-year-old man named Blake expresses sexual interest in the younger diarist, and snorts a line of cocaine with her. The diarist also hopes to emulate Lauren, one of the addicts in her social group. Lauren is beautiful, wealthy, wears designer clothes and has a snobby personality. The diarist's grades begin slipping, and Cam is horrified by her change in personality, as she becomes more mean-spirited and vicious. She finds that her newfound friends are more flawed than they appear to be, particularly when she is nearly raped while high and none of them are surprised by this. As time goes on, intermingled with periods of blackout drunkenness, the diarist experiments with meth and heroin. After a DUI is issued to her, she is forced to go to Alcoholics Anonymous meetings, which she hates, and to face her parents and Cam. She gets clean and sober after a length of self-reflection and more meetings, but then she relapses and dies, leaving only her diary behind.

== Reception ==
Lucy in the Sky received mostly negative reviews from critics, who compared the book to Go Ask Alice and also considered it too ineffective and silly in its approach to the subject matter of substance abuse. Publishers Weekly stated, "echoing the theme and structure of Go Ask Alice, this inelegant cautionary tale paints an appropriately horrific picture of addiction, but offers little insight beyond what is taught in drug education programs." Kirkus Reviews appreciated the addition of the character Cam as the unnamed diarist's older brother, stating, "Cam is one of the most compelling, and readers see him struggling to balance his loyalty to his sister against his concern for her safety", however Kirkus also disliked the book's ending, saying of it, "the book's cautionary ending feels abrupt and ineffective, perhaps because scaring readers straight was never really the point."

== See also ==
- List of anonymously published works
