= Andrew Cassels (merchant) =

British merchant

Andrew Cassels (1811 – 2 August 1886) was a British merchant who traded in India and England. He was a member of the Council of India from 1874 to 1884.

== Biography ==
Born in an old Scottish family, his father resided for some years at Manchester, where he was an associate of John Peel, MP, head of Messers John Peel and Co. He spent some years in Europe, chiefly in Italy. In 1843, Andrew Cassels opened for Peel a branch of the firm in Bombay, which eventually traded as Messers. Peel, Cassels, and Co. Two of his brothers, including Walter Richard Cassels, were also involved with the firm, which failed in about 1885.

Returning to England in either 1851 or around 1854, he continued in business in Manchester for some years. He was also a director of the Metropolitan Railway Company and a long-serving chairman of the Chartered Bank of India, Australia and China. He was elected a director of the Manchester Chamber of Commerce in 1861, resigned in 1868 when he moved to London to sit on the Council of India, to which he was appointed through pressure from the Manchester Chamber of Commercial on Lord Salisbury, the Secretary of State for India. He retired from the Council in 1884 on the expiry of his term.

He died in 1886.
