= Bourbon Kid =

Novel series by an anonymous British author

- The Book With No Name; The Eye of the Moon; The Devil's Graveyard; The Book of Death
- Author: Anonymous
- Language: English, French, German, Spanish
- Genre: Horror, thriller, black comedy
- Publisher: Ten Speed Press (first printing), Michael O'Mara Books
- Published: 2000–2012
- Media type: Print

The Bourbon Kid series is a horror/thriller series by an anonymous British author. The series began with The Book With No Name, which was originally published in 2006 through Lulu.com, but has since been re-released through Michael O'Mara Books. The books center on a supernatural serial killer only known as the "Bourbon Kid". The first book in the series was initially written with the intent to make it a Western novel, with the author choosing to move the series to the present day partway through the book.

The Bourbon Kid series has been published in multiple languages, including Spanish, French, German, Polish and English.

== Background ==
The first book in the series, The Book With No Name, was initially published on the internet due to a lack of interest from publishers. The author stated that this was due to him refusing to give the publishers his name as well as the book not fitting into any specific genre. In an interview with L'Express the author mentioned that he had begun working on a fourth book in the series entitled The Book of Death, but temporarily shelved it due to the writing process becoming too unpleasant. The book was later published in France due to a successful Facebook campaign by fans of the author. It was subsequently published in German, English and Spanish. Sales of the books exceed 3 million copies.

== Synopsis ==
The series premise centers on antihero Bourbon Kid, who as a teenager becomes a supernatural serial killer after drinking some tainted alcohol. As the series progresses, he becomes hunted by several different groups of people and must find a way to stop the evil plans of various villains. In 2013, the author began a new series featuring another serial killer known as The Red Mohawk. In 2015 the Bourbon Kid and Red Mohawk teamed up in The Plot to Kill the Pope.

== Bibliography ==
1. The Book With No Name (2006)
2. The Eye of the Moon (2008)
3. The Devil's Graveyard (2010)
4. The Book of Death (2012)
5. The Red Mohawk (2013)
6. Sanchez: A Christmas Carol (2014)
7. The Plot To Kill the Pope (2016)
8. The Day It Rained Blood (2017)
9. The Greatest Trick the Devil Ever Pulled (2019)
10. Showdown With the Devil (2021)
11. Killing The Elite (2023)
12. The Return of Hitler (2025)

In 2011, the author has contributed to a story titled "Cadavre exquis: l'ai-je bien descendu?" published in French in the magazine L'officiel #959, October 2011, within a four-page story written by eight people. As described in the magazine, in order of appearance to the reader: François Bégaudeau, Bourbon Kid – the famous unknown author, Mazarine Pingeot, Philippe Besson, Clémence Boulouque, Thibault de Montaigu, David Foenkinos and Nicolas Bedos

== Film adaptation ==
In 2011, it was announced that rights to the series had been purchased by Don Murphy, with the intention of turning the series into a feature film. It was later announced in July 2012 that the series was now in development with Fox Television Studios to become a television series entitled Pulp.

In 2014, it was reported in Variety magazine that Tobey Maguire and Alexandra Milchan were producing an adaptation of The Red Mohawk. In 2015, Belga Films began working on development of a movie based on The Book With No Name.
