= Memoirs of a Russian Princess =

1890 anonymous erotic novel

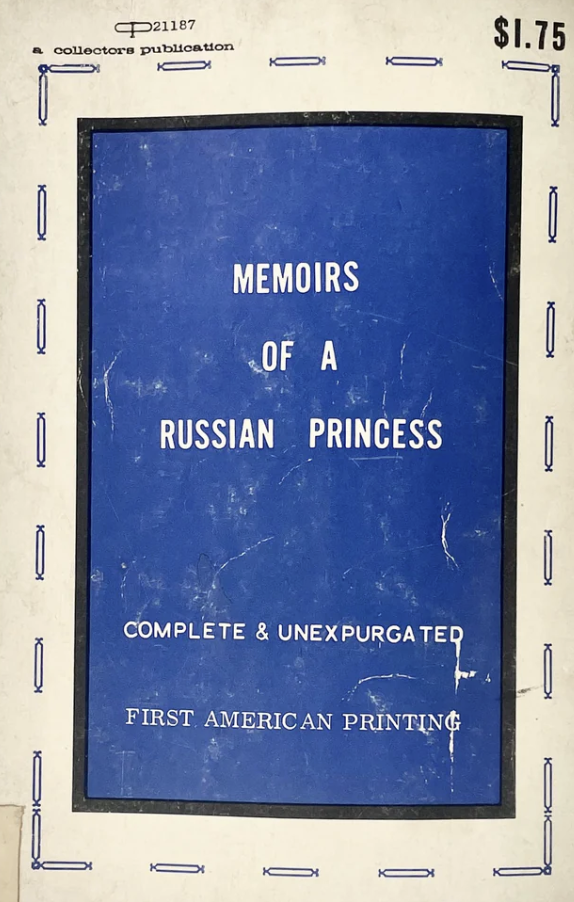
- Author: Anonymous
- Publication date: 1890

Memoirs of a Russian Princess is an 1890 erotic novel written by an anonymous author known as "Katoumbah Pasha" or "Pasha Katoumbah." The book is set in Russia during the late 18th century and is purportedly based on the intimate diary of "Vavara Softa", the daughter of a powerful Russian boyar named "Dimitri".

It was also published in French, Spanish, Japanese and Dutch and was reprinted in English in 1907 and in the 1930s. It was reprinted in 1967 by Grove Press.

It is included in a Dutch anthology or erotic fiction in 1983.
