= Lament for Sumer and Ur =

Poem

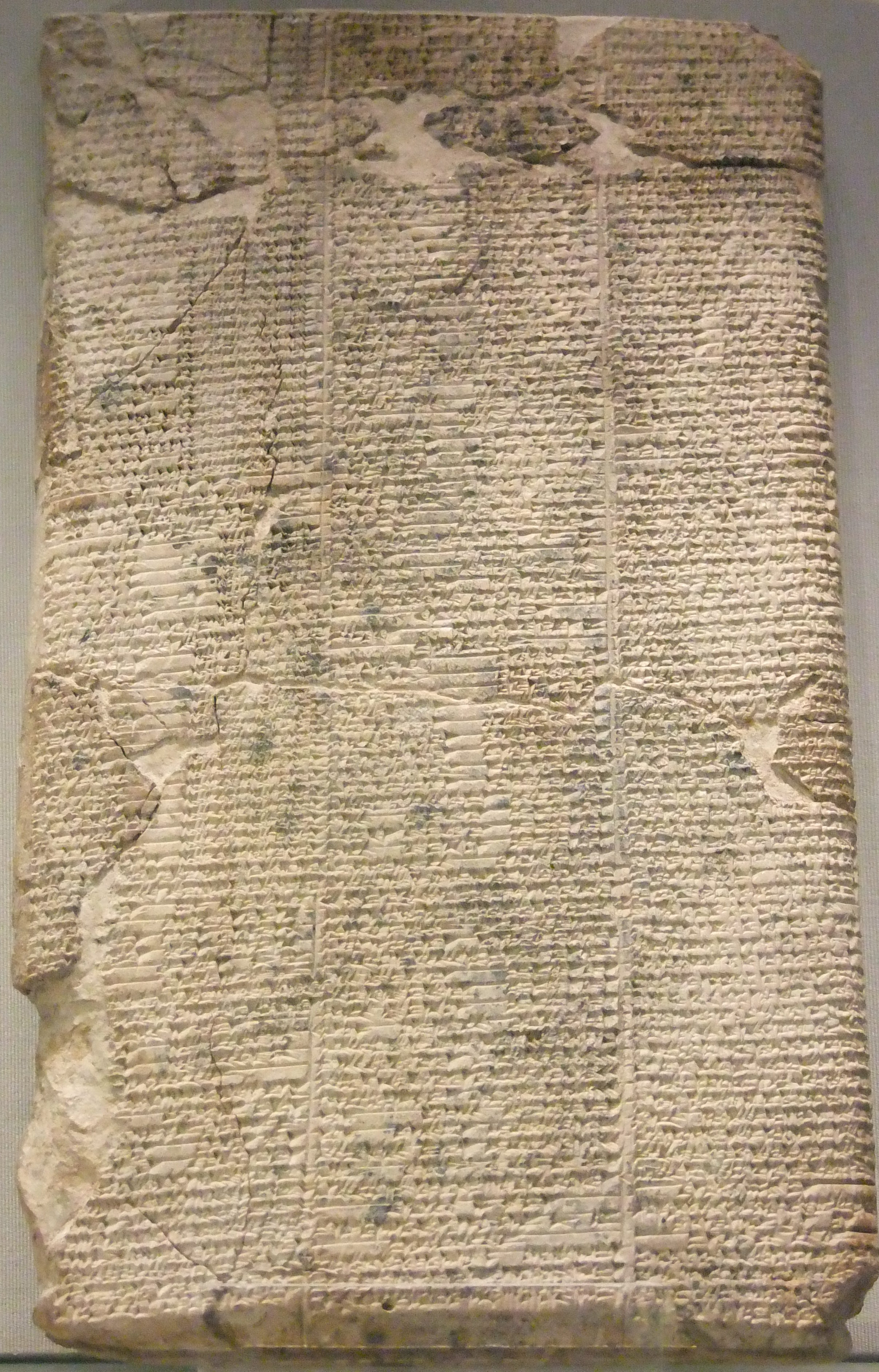
The Lament for Ur at the Louvre Museum in Paris

The lament for Sumer and Urim or the lament for Sumer and Ur is a poem and one of five known Mesopotamian "city laments"—dirges for ruined cities in the voice of the city's tutelary goddess.

The other city laments are:

- The Lament for Ur
- The Lament for Nippur
- The Lament for Eridu
- The Lament for Uruk

In 2004 BCE, during the last year of King Ibbi-Sin's reign, Ur fell to an Elamite army leading by king Kindattu of Shimashki. The Sumerians decided that such a catastrophic event could only be explained through divine intervention and wrote in the lament that the gods, "An, Enlil, Enki and Ninmah decided [Ur's] fate"

The literary works of the Sumerians were widely translated (e.g., by the Hittites, Hurrians and Canaanites). Sumeria historian Samuel Noah Kramer wrote that later Greek as well as Hebrew texts "were profoundly influenced by them." Contemporary scholars have drawn parallels between the lament and passages from the Bible (e.g., "the Lord departed from his temple and stood on the mountain east of Jerusalem (Ezekiel 10:18-19)."
