= The New York Times anonymous publications =

Op-eds published anonymously in the New York Times

The New York Times occasionally allows the publication of an anonymous op-ed piece when there is concern over the consequences of publishing the author's real name. Only a handful of anonymous pieces have been published by The New York Times throughout its history. The context and process of anonymous publications were discussed with readers in 2018, under the form of a "Frequently Asked Questions" article.

== List ==
Date	Title	Anonymity rationale	Context	Author's identity
January 23, 1972	Why Do Homosexual Playwrights Hide Their Homosexuality?	"[Only] the rich, the self-employed or the social outcast has nothing to fear from being labeled a homosexual. Freedom, even in 1972, is something one must be able to afford. No one who has a regular desk job in industry – as I do – can be startled by my action. They know that instant dismissal, as well as investigation of their friends, would follow as a matter of course."	In the Arts and Leisure section. The author, identified by the pseudonym Lee Barton, writer of the play Nightride, was concerned by social and economic consequences of outing.	Remains anonymous
January 4, 1990	The Soviets' Terminal Crisis	"The following article is adapted from the conclusion of a longer historical analysis to be published under the pseudonym 'Z' in the Winter issue of Daedalus, Journal of the American Academy of Arts and Sciences. Daedalus is withholding the author's name from all parties at the author's request. (Although it is not the New York Times's usual practice to withhold an author's identity, it is honoring Daedalus's commitment)."	Dissolution of the Soviet Union	Martin Malia self-exposed later in 1990.
June 18, 2009	A Different Iranian Revolution	"This article was written by a student in Iran who, for reasons of safety, did not want to be identified by his full name."	In the context of then-ongoing 2009 Iranian protests.	Remains anonymous
January 14, 2016	Living Under the Sword of ISIS in Syria	"[The author being from] Raqqa using a pen name to protect him from being targeted by the Islamic State".	Author lived in Raqqa city, then controlled by Islamic State group.	Remains anonymous
March 31, 2016	A Syrian Refugee’s Message to the European Union	"[Author] asked that her surname be withheld because she fears telling her story could endanger her family in Syria or affect her asylum claim" and "a Syrian refugee in Greece, using her first name only because her family in Syria faced threats".	Syrian Civil War, Refugees of the Syrian Civil War, European migrant crisis.	Remains anonymous
June 25, 2018	What My 6-Year-Old Son and I Endured in Family Detention	"The author wrote on the condition of anonymity because of the gang-related threats she and her family face in the United States and in El Salvador" and threat of deportation, the author being an undocumented immigrant in the U.S. and asylum seeker.	Immigrant detentions and family separations under the direction of Donald Trump.	Remains anonymous
September 5, 2018	I Am Part of the Resistance Inside the Trump Administration	"[A]t the request of the author, a senior official in the Trump administration whose identity is known to us and whose job would be jeopardized by its disclosure. We believe publishing this essay anonymously is the only way to deliver an important perspective to our readers."	One and a half years after Donald Trump became President of the United States, calls for impeachment, frequent White House leaks and coming 2018 United States elections.	Miles Taylor self-exposed on October 28, 2020.
