= Lament for Uruk =

Sumerian lament

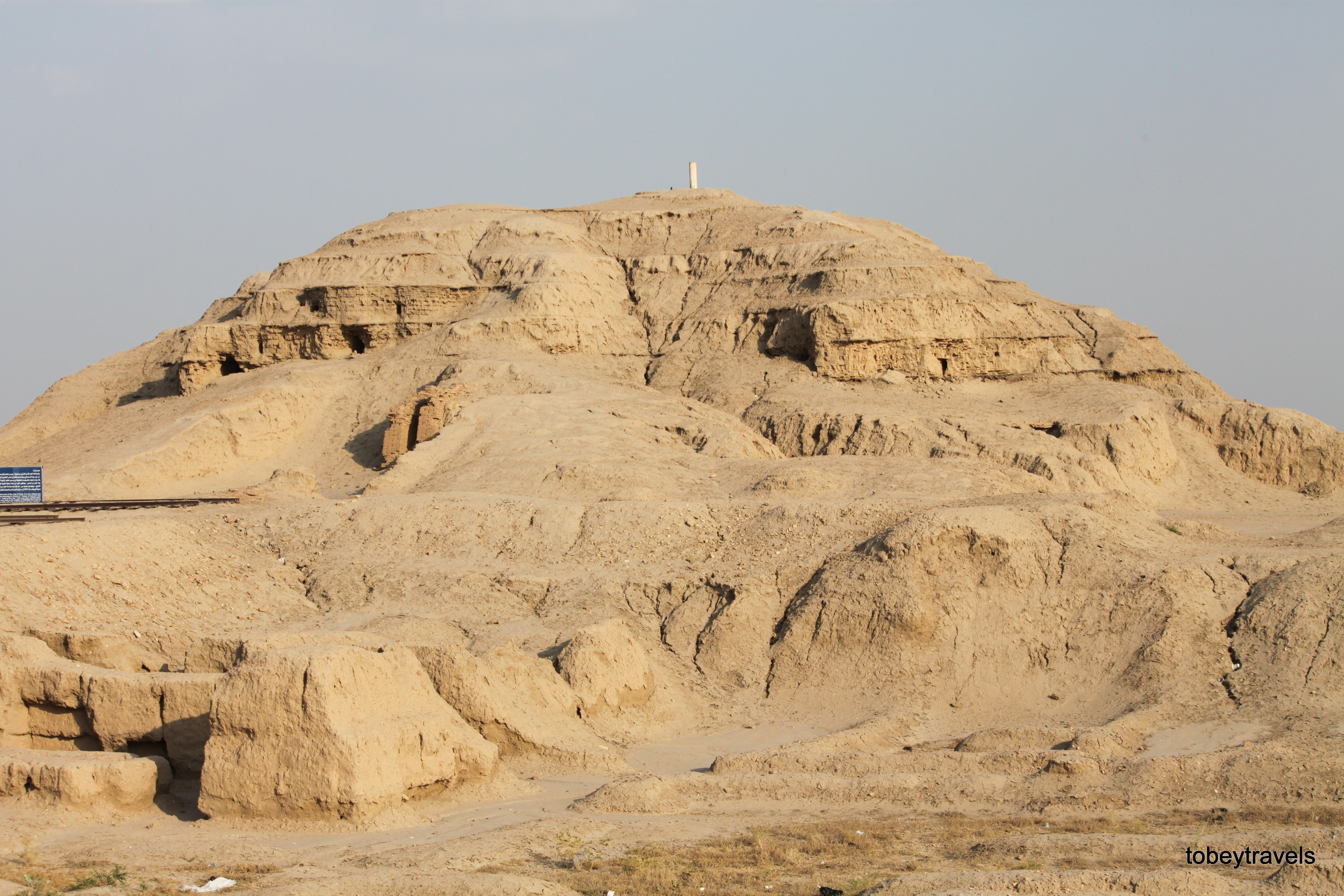
Remains of a ziggurat in Uruk

The Lament for Uruk, also called the Uruk Lament or the Lament for Unug, is a Sumerian lament. It is dated to the Isin-Larsa period.

== History ==
The Lament for Uruk is one of five known Mesopotamian "city laments"—dirges for ruined cities in the voice of the city's tutelary goddess, recited by elegists called gala. It was inspired by the Lament for Ur.

First written in c. 1940 BCE, the Lament was recopied during the Hellenistic period, when Babylonia had again been overrun by foreigners.

Map of Mesopotamia around the time of the writing of the Lament for Uruk

== Text ==
The Lament is 260 lines long, being composed of 12 kirugu (sections, songs) and 11 gišgigal (antiphons).

Numbered by kirugu, the lament is structured as follows:

1. storm of Enlil (storm in Uruk)
2. storm of Enlil (storm in Uruk)
3. storm of Enlil (storm in Sumer)
4. weeping goddess; the poet addresses Sumer
5. weeping goddess; the poet addresses Uruk
6. weeping goddess; the poet addresses Uruk (?)
7. lost
8. lost
9. lost
10. lost
11. prayer; the poet addresses the gods
12. prayer; the poet addresses Inanna

It is composed in the standard emegir dialect of Sumerian.

== See also ==
- The Lament for Sumer and Ur
- The Lament for Ur
- The Lament for Eridu
- The Lament for Nippur
