= Lament for Nippur =

Sumerian lament

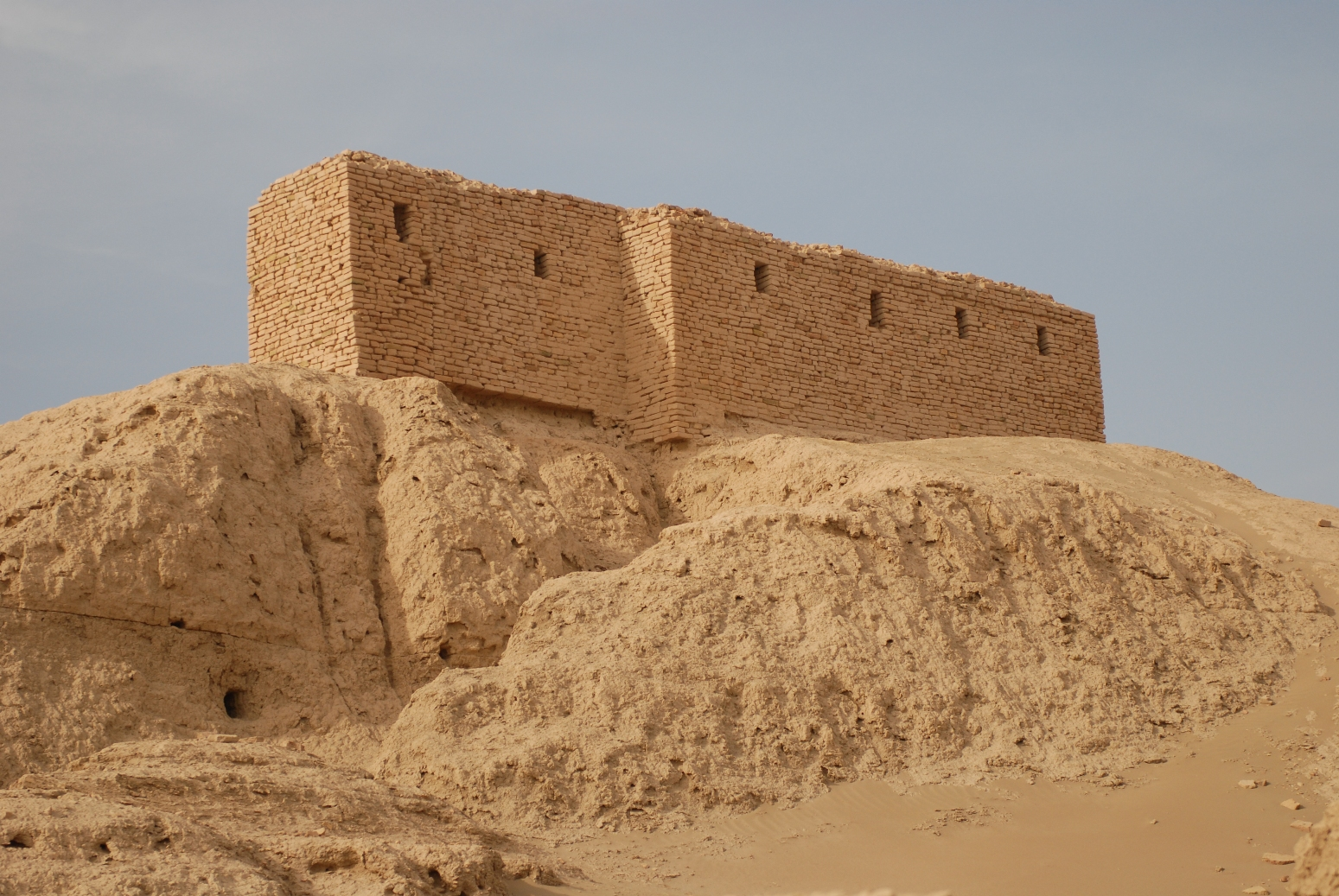
Remains of the Ekur (mountain temple) in Nippur: the Lament reads, The brickwork of E-kur gave you only tears and lamentation -- it sings a bitter song of the proper cleansing-rites that are forgotten! It weeps bitter tears over the splendid rites and most precious plans which are desecrated -- its most sacred food rations neglected and ...... into funeral offerings, it cries "Alas!". The temple despairs of its divine powers, utterly cleansed, pure, hallowed, which are now defiled!

The Lament for Nippur, or the Lament for Nibru, is a Sumerian lament, also known by its incipit tur_{3} me nun-e ("After the cattle pen..."). It is dated to the Old Babylonian Empire (c. 1900–1600 BCE). It is preserved in Penn Museum on tablet CBS13856.

It is one of five known Mesopotamian "city laments"—dirges for ruined cities in the voice of the city's tutelary goddess.

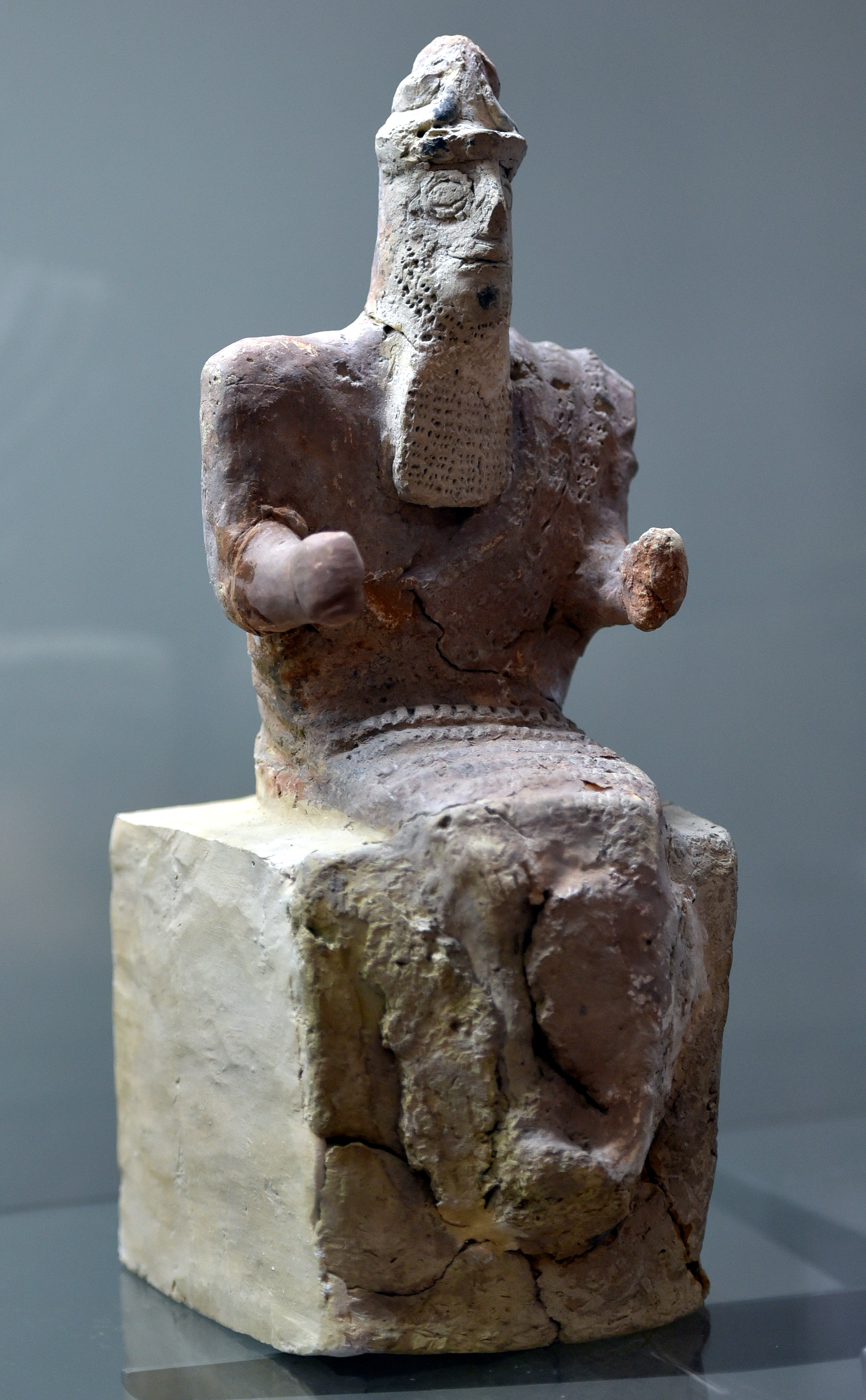
Statuette of the storm god Enlil from Nippur, c. 1800–1600 BCE.

Map of Mesopotamia around the time of the writing of the Lament for Nippur

== Text ==
The Lament is composed of 9 kirugu (sections, songs) and 8 gišgigal (antiphons) followed by 3 more kirugu.

Numbered by kirugu, the lament is structured as follows:

1. storm of Enlil; Enlil destroys Nippur
2. weeping goddess; Nippur addresses Enlil
3. storm of Enlil; Enlil destroys Nippur
4. weeping goddess; the poet addresses Nippur
5. storm of Enlil; Ishme-Dagan recreates Nippur
6. weeping goddess; the poet addresses Nippur
7. storm of Enlil; Ishme-Dagan recreates Nippur
8. storm of Enlil; Enlil recreates Nippur
9. storm of Enlil; Ishme-Dagan recreates Nippur
10. storm of Enlil; Enlil recreates Nippur
11. storm of Enlil; Ishme-Dagan recreates Nippur
12. storm of Enlil; Enlil recreates Nippur

It includes passages in the emesal, a sociolect used by high-status women, showing the importance of women's voices in city laments; emesal is also found in the Lament for Ur.

== See also ==
- The Lament for Sumer and Ur
- The Lament for Ur
- The Lament for Eridu
- The Lament for Uruk
