= City Lament =

Poetic elegy for a lost or fallen city

A City Lament is a poetic elegy for a lost or fallen city. This literary genre, from around 2000 BCE onwards, was particularly prevalent in the Mesopotamian region of the Ancient Near East. The Bible's Book of Lamentations, concerning Jerusalem around 586 BCE, contains some elements of a city lament.

== Features ==
In the five known Mesopotamian City Laments, the lament is written in voice of the city's tutelary goddess.

The destruction of the city, the mass killing of its inhabitants, and the loss of its central temple are vividly described. Special attention is given to the divine sphere, where the gods order the destruction of the city, the city patron gods implore against this, but in vain. The patron gods are exiled to live as deportees in foreign cites, lamenting their devastated shrine. Subsequently, they return from exile and renew their former existence.

== Mesopotamia ==
The Lament for Ur, or Lamentation over the city of Ur is a Sumerian lament composed around the time of the fall of Ur to the Elamites and the end of the city's third dynasty around 2000 BCE.

The Lament for Sumer and Ur concerns the events of 2004 BCE, during the last year of King Ibbi-Sin's reign, when Ur fell to an army from the east. The Sumerians decided that such a catastrophic event could only be explained through divine intervention and wrote in the lament that the gods, "An, Enlil, Enki and Ninmah decided [Ur's] fate".

The Lament for Eridu. Unlike Ur or Akkad we don't have a good idea of how Eridu actually fell, or when other than in the Early Dynastic period. The Sumerian King List simply says "Then Eridug fell and the kingship was taken to Bad-tibira". This lament also describes how the loss of favor with the gods led to its fall.

There was also a Lament for Uruk and a Lament for Nippur. A fragmentary Lament for Kesh and Malgium has also been found.

The literary works of the Sumerians were widely translated by, for example, the Hittites, Hurrians and Canaanites. Samuel Noah Kramer suggests that subsequent Greek as well as Hebrew texts "were profoundly influenced by them." Contemporary scholars have drawn parallels between the lament and passages from the Bible (e.g. "the Lord departed from his temple and stood on the mountain east of Jerusalem (Ezekiel 10:18-19)."

== Hebrew Bible ==
In the Jewish tradition, this genre also appears over a millennium later in the Hebrew Bible, particularly in reference to the destruction of Jerusalem by Nebuchadnezzar II of Babylon in the sixth century BCE. The similarities are, however, of motif rather than of form; in other respects, the Hebrew genre is quite different from its Sumerian predecessors.

=== Lamentations ===
The Book of Lamentations shares some motifs with earlier Mesopotamian laments. Whereas the Mesopotamian laments are in the voice of the city's tutelary goddess, Lamentations, with its monotheistic background, is instead tenderly addressed as "Daughter Jerusalem" and "Daughter Zion".

Like its Mesopotamian predecessors, it personifies the city, grieves over its destruction by God, and prays that calamity will overtake its destroyers. Unlike them, God does not weep over the destroyed sanctuary, nor does it portray a rebuilding, nor give praise for such a prospect.

=== Other occurrences ===
Much of the postexilic scroll of Isaiah concerns the destroyed and restored city of Jerusalem.

Laments can also be found in the Book of Jeremiah, the Book of Amos, the Book of Ezekiel and Psalm 137.

== Bibliography ==
- Hayes, John H. (1998). "The Songs of Israel". In McKenzie, Steven L.; Graham, Matt Patrick (eds.). The Hebrew Bible Today: An Introduction to Critical Issues. Westminster John Knox Press. ISBN 9780664256524.
