= De Dubiis Nominibus =

De Dubiis Nominibus ("On Doubtful Nouns") is a 7th-century document, possibly from Bordeaux, by an anonymous author. It is an alphabetically sorted list of words whose gender, plural form or spelling was in question by the author. The author attempted to resolve the questions through citations from classical and Christian authors with notes next to each word.
