= Walter Richard Cassels =

English poet and theological critic (1826–1907)

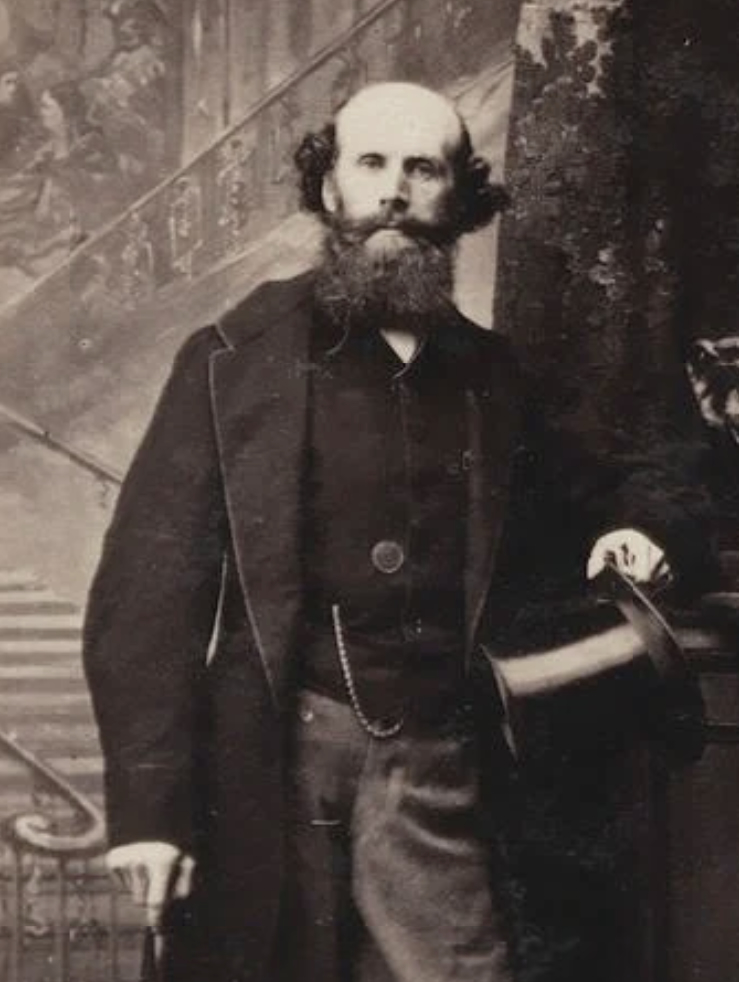
- Cassels in 1863
- Born: 4 September 1826; London, England
- Died: 10 June 1907 (aged 80); London, England
- Occupations: Writer, merchant
- Writing career
- Notable work: Supernatural Religion

Walter Richard Cassels (4 September 1826 – 10 June 1907) was an English poet and theological critic best known as the author of Supernatural Religion (1874).

== Early life ==
Cassels was born in London, the youngest son of Robert Cassels and Jean Scougall. His father was a British consul at Honfleur. In the 1850s, he published two volumes of poetry, and spent three years in Italy, where he befriended the poets Robert and Elizabeth Browning. He later became a partner with two of his brothers, Andrew and John, in the firm of Peel, Cassels & Co. in Bombay, India. In 1862, he published a monograph on the Bombay cotton industry. After serving on the Legislative Council of Bombay from 1863 to 1865, Cassels returned to England.

== Supernatural Religion ==
In 1874, Cassels published an anonymous two-volume work entitled Supernatural Religion: An Inquiry into the Reality of Divine Revelation, in which he challenged the credibility of miracles and the validity of the New Testament. The work at once attracted attention, and resulted in much speculation about the identity of the anonymous author. Theologian Otto Pfleiderer remarked that "Never before had such a systematic attack, based upon solid learning, been made in English upon the external evidences of the Christian religion." Many books and articles were written in response to the criticism of Christianity made in Supernatural Religion. The most famous of these rebuttals is a series of essays by Bishop J. B. Lightfoot, which were subsequently collected and published as a book. In 1877, Cassels added a third volume to Supernatural Religion, and a fully revised edition was published in 1879. Cassels published a series of anonymous replies to Bishop Lightfoot and other critics in magazine articles and as notes or prefaces to reprints of Supernatural Religion. These replies were also compiled as a book in 1889. Abridged popular editions of Supernatural Religion in a single volume were published in 1902 and 1905.

== Later life ==
News of Cassels' authorship of Supernatural Religion began to leak out in 1895, after he published a series of signed articles on theology. However, Cassels never publicly acknowledged his authorship of Supernatural Religion. Little is known about his private life, or of how he acquired his extensive knowledge of early Christianity. It is known that he collected art and was a Fellow of the Royal Photographic Society. He never married and died in London on 10 June 1907.

== Works ==
- Eidolon, or the Course of a Soul; and other poems. William Pickering: London, 1850.
- Poems. Smith, Elder & Co.: London, 1856.
- Cotton: An Account of its Culture in the Bombay Presidency. 1862.

=== Published anonymously ===
- Supernatural Religion: An Inquiry into the Reality of Divine Revelation.
  - Longmans & Co.: London, 1874 (Volumes I and II). Six editions, 1874–1876. Volume III, 1877.
  - Complete Edition (3 vols), 1879.
  - Popular edition (in 1 volume), 1902, Watts & Co. (Reprinted 1905.)
- A Reply to Dr. Lightfoot's Essays. Longmans & Co.: London, 1889.
- The Gospel according to Peter: A Study. Longmans & Co.: London, 1894.

== Bibliography ==
- Lee, Sidney, ed. (1912). "Cassels, Walter Richard" . Dictionary of National Biography (2nd supplement). Vol. 1. London: Smith, Elder & Co.
- Tracks of a Rolling Stone (1905), Henry J. Coke.
- "Matthew Arnold and 'The Author of Supernatural Religion': The Background to God and the Bible", by Jerold J. Savory. SEL: Studies in English Literature 1500–1900, Autumn 1976 (Vol 16 no 4), pp. 677–91.
- "Male Diagnosis of the Female Pen in Late Victorian Britain: Private Assessments of Supernatural Religion", by Alan H. Cadwallader. Journal of Anglican Studies, Vol. 5, No. 1, pp. 69–88 (2007).
