= A Strange Manuscript Found in a Copper Cylinder =

1888 novel by James De Mille

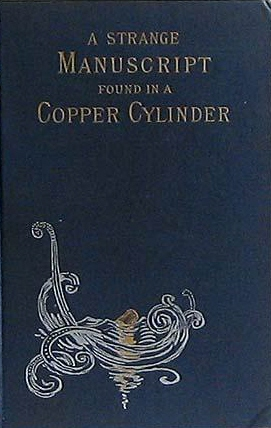
- Cover
- Author: James De Mille
- Language: English
- Genre: Fantasy novel Science fiction
- Publisher: Harper & Brothers
- Publication date: 1888
- Publication place: Canada
- Media type: Print (Hardback)
- Pages: 291 pp
- ISBN: 978-1515037941

A Strange Manuscript Found in a Copper Cylinder is an 1888 novel by the Canadian writer James De Mille. It was serialized posthumously and anonymously in Harper's Weekly, and published in book form by Harper and Brothers of New York City in 1888. It was serialized subsequently in the United Kingdom and Australia, and published in book form in the United Kingdom and Canada. Later editions were published from the plates of Harper & Brothers' first edition during the late 19th and early 20th centuries.

The satirical and fantastic romance is set in an imaginary semi-tropical land in Antarctica inhabited by prehistoric monsters and a cult of death-worshipers called the Kosekin. Written many years before it was published, it is reminiscent of Edgar Allan Poe's The Narrative of Arthur Gordon Pym of Nantucket (1838) and anticipates the exotic locale and fantasy-adventure elements of works of the "Lost World genre" such as Arthur Conan Doyle's The Lost World (1912) and Edgar Rice Burroughs' The Land That Time Forgot (1918), as well as innumerable prehistoric world movies based loosely on these and other works. The title and locale were inspired by Edgar Allan Poe's MS. Found in a Bottle (1833).

It was unfortunate for De Mille's reputation as a writer that this work was published after She (1887) and King Solomon's Mines (1885). Although H. Rider Haggard's works were well known by then, the actual composition of De Mille's romance pre-dated the publication of the popular romances and his ideas were not in the least derivative from Haggard's better known works.

== Synopsis ==
The main story of the novel is the narrative of the adventures of Adam More, a British sailor shipwrecked on a homeward voyage from Tasmania. After passing through a tunnel of volcanic origin, he finds himself in a "lost world" of prehistoric animals, plants and people sustained by volcanic heat despite the long Antarctic night. In this strange volcanic world, More finds a well-developed human society that, in the tradition of topsy-turvy worlds of folklore and satire (compare Sir Thomas More's Utopia (1516), Erewhon (1872) by Samuel Butler, or Charlotte Perkins Gilman's Herland (1915)) has reversed the values of the Victorian era. Wealth is scorned and poverty is revered, death and darkness are preferred to life and light, and, rather than accumulating wealth, the natives seek to divest themselves of it as quickly as possible.

A secondary plot and framing device concerns four yachtsmen who find Adam More's manuscript sealed in a copper cylinder. They comment on More's report, and one of them identifies the Kosekin language as a Semitic language, possibly derived from Hebrew.

== Critical reception ==
Contemporary reviews of the novel, unaware that it was written earlier, were coloured by the prior release of She and King Solomon's Mines by H. Rider Haggard. A review in The New York Times, 21 May 1888, notes that "if the author of 'A Strange Manuscript' were living he would find it a quite hopeless task to persuade people that he had not read and imitated She and King Solomon's Mines" while a review in the Brooklyn Daily Eagle, 3 June 1888, called the book a "somewhat belated story". Both reviews, along with a July 1888 review in The Week, a Toronto newspaper, commented positively on the illustrations by Gilbert Gaul.

== See also ==
- Lost World (genre)

== Bibliography ==
- A Strange Manuscript Found in a Copper Cylinder was first published in nineteen installments in Harper's Weekly, Vol. 32, from January 7, 1888 (No. 1620) to May 12, 1888 (No. 1638). Each installment was accompanied by an illustration by Gilbert Gaul.
- De Mille, James. A Strange Manuscript Found in a Copper Cylinder. First American Edition. Harper and Brothers, New York, 1888.
- De Mille, James. A Strange Manuscript Found in a Copper Cylinder. First British Edition. Chatto and Windus, London, 1888.
- De Mille, James. A Strange Manuscript Found in a Copper Cylinder. First Canadian Edition. Robinson, Montreal, 1888.
- De Mille, James. A Strange Manuscript Found in a Copper Cylinder. New Canadian Library Edition. McClelland and Stewart, Toronto, 1969.
- De Mille, James. A Strange Manuscript Found in a Copper Cylinder. Edited by Malcolm Parks. Carleton University Press, Ottawa, 1986. ISBN 0-88629-039-2 (hardcover), ISBN 0-7735-2167-4 (paperback)
- De Mille, James. A Strange Manuscript Found in a Copper Cylinder. Edited by Daniel Burgoyne. Broadview Press, Peterborough, 2011. ISBN 978-1-55111-959-5.
