= James De Mille =

Canadian novelist (1833–1880)

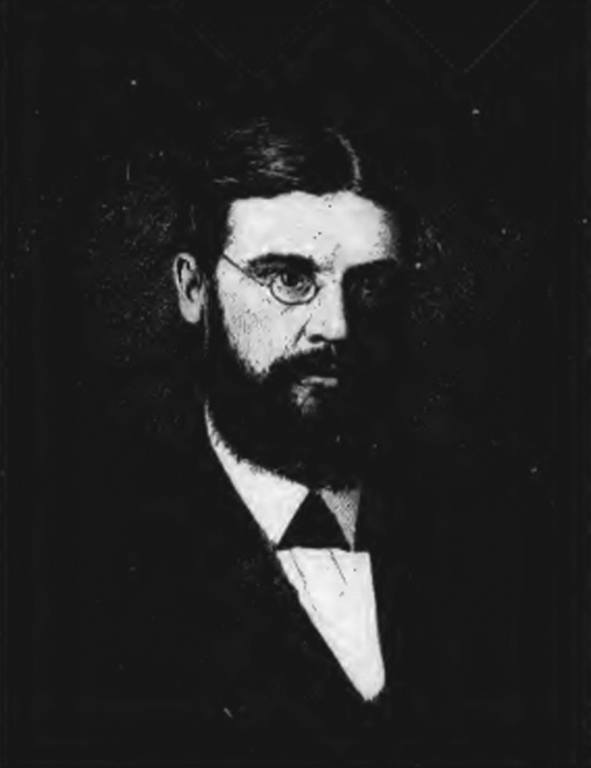
- Born: 23 August 1833; Saint John, New Brunswick, Canada
- Died: 28 January 1880 (aged 46); Halifax, Nova Scotia, Canada
- Occupation: Novelist

James De Mille (23 August 1833 – 28 January 1880) was Canadian novelist and academic. He was a professor at Dalhousie University, Nova Scotia, and published numerous works of popular fiction from the late 1860s through the 1870s.

== Life ==
De Mille was born in Saint John, New Brunswick, son of the merchant and shipowner, Nathan De Mille. He attended Horton Academy in Wolfville and spent one year at Acadia University. He then travelled with his brother Elisha Budd to Europe, spending half a year in England, France and Italy, scenes of which became settings for many of his works. Soon after his return to North America, he attended Brown University, from which he obtained a Master of Arts degree during 1854. He married Anne Pryor, daughter of the president of Acadia University, John Pryor, and was there appointed professor of classics. He served there until 1865 when he accepted a new appointment at Dalhousie as professor of English and rhetoric. He continued to write and teach at Dalhousie until his early death at the age of 46.

== Works ==
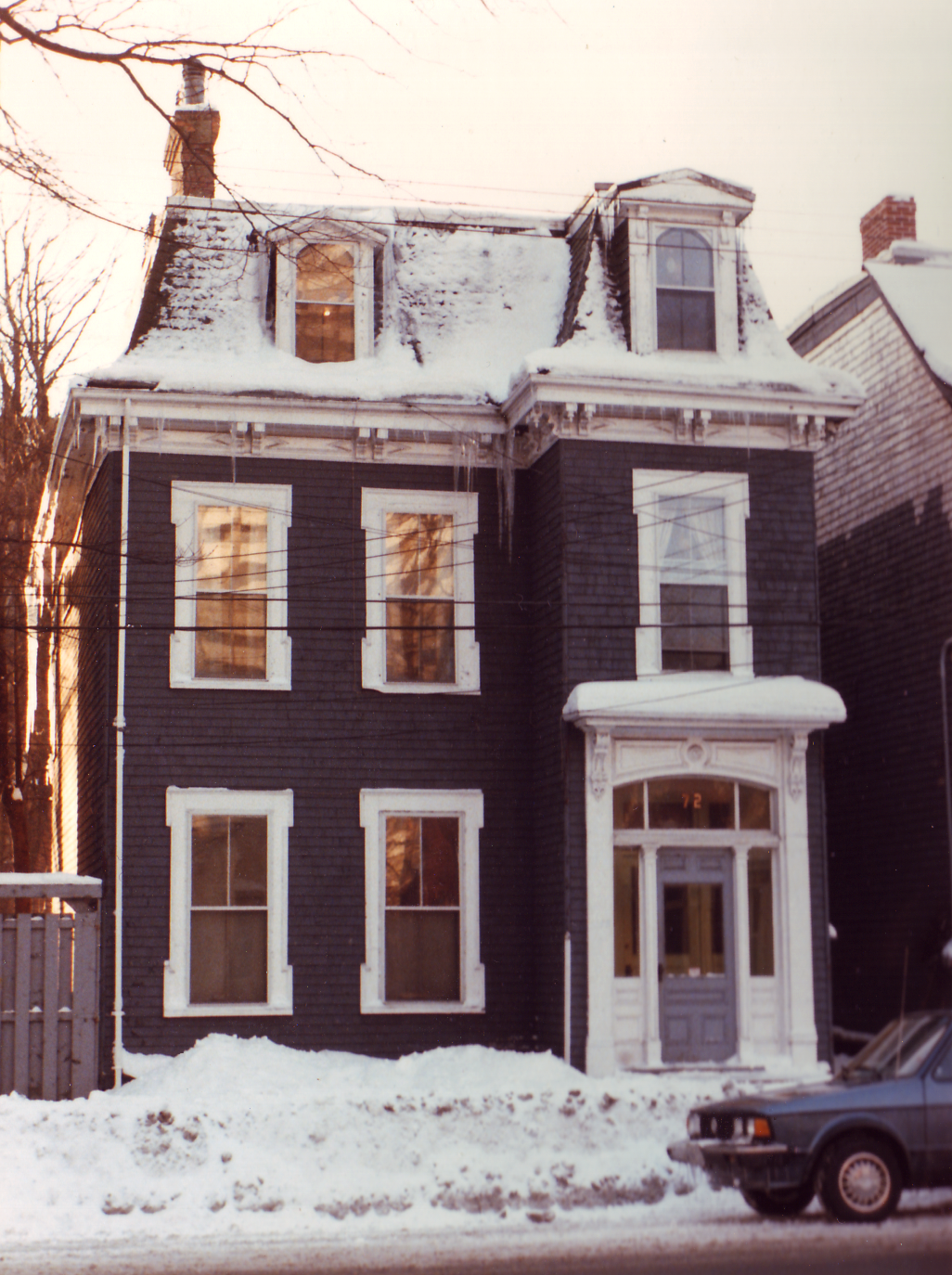
James De Mille's residence at 72 South Park Street, Halifax.

His most popular work with contemporaries, and the work for which he is most known presently, is A Strange Manuscript Found in a Copper Cylinder, which was serialized posthumously in the magazine Harper's Weekly, and published in book form by Harper and Brothers of New York City, in 1888.

Other works included the 1867 historical novel Helena's Household: A Tale of Rome in the First Century (the 1890 edition was subtitled : An Ideal of Roman Life in the Time of Paul and Nero), and the following:

- A Book for Boys: Containing Stories of Boys Who Won Their Way to Honor or Wealth by Obedience, Industry, and Piety (1860?)
- The Martyr of the Catacombs: A Tale of Ancient Rome (1865) -- originally published under the pseudonym, "An Anonymous Christian"
- A Week at Forestdale, Being a Summer Idyl (1868)
- A Castle in Spain (1869)
- Cord and Creese (1869)
- The Lady of the Ice (1870)
- The Cryptogram (1871)
- The American Baron (1872)
- A Comedy of Terrors (1872)
- The Dodge Club; or Italy in 1859 (1873)
- An Open Question (1873)
- The Seven Hills (1873)
- The Lily and the Cross: A Novel / Tale of Acadia (1874)
- The Living Link (1874)
- Among the Brigands (1875)
- The Babes in the Wood, a Tragic Comedy: A Story of the Italian Revolution of 1848 (1875)
- John Wheeler's Two Uncles, or Launching Into Life: A Story for Boys (1877)
- The Winged Lion; or Stories of Venice (1877)
- Old Garth: A Story of Sicily (1883)
- A Strange Manuscript Found in a Copper Cylinder (1888)
- Behind the Veil: A Poem (1893)
- Nest of Pyrates: Pirate Verse from the Seven Seas
- Sweet Maiden of Passamaquoddy

The B.O.W.C. Club series:

- The Brethren of the White Cross: A Book for Boys (aka The "B.O.W.C.") (1869)
- The Boys of Grand Pre School (1870)
- Lost in the Fog (1870)
- Fire in the Woods (1871)
- Picked Up Adrift (1872)
- The Treasure of the Seas (1873)

Nonfiction:

- The Early English Church (1877)
- The Elements of Rhetoric (1878)

Many of DeMille's books were originally published in serial form in such periodicals as Harper's Weekly.
