= Eridu =

Archaeological site in Iraq

- 𒉣𒆠 (Sumerian) تل أبو شهرين (Arabic)
- Tell Abu Shahrain
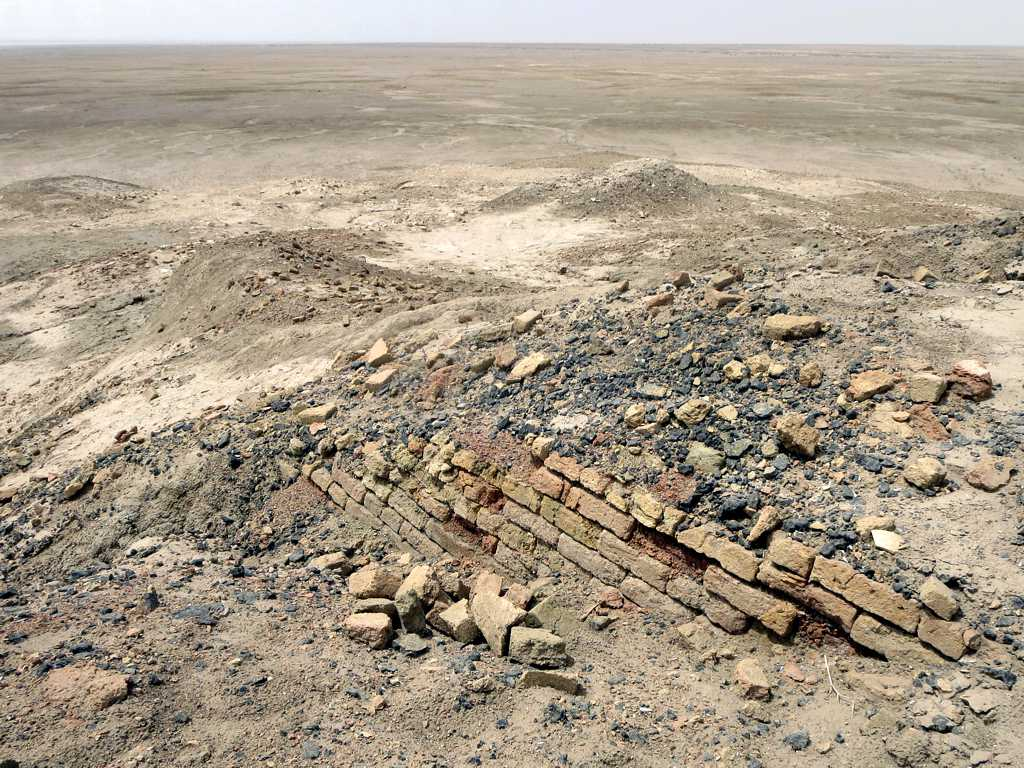
- Ruins of a ziggurat at Eridu

- Location within Iraq
- 30°48′57″N 45°59′46″E
- Type: Ancient city
- Periods: List: Ubaid period; Uruk period; Early Dynastic period; Akkadian period; Gutian period; Ur III period; Isin-Larsa period; Old Babylonian period; Middle Babylonian period; Neo-Babylonian period
- Location: Al-Batha Subdistrict, Nasiriyah District, Dhi Qar Governorate, Iraq
- Region: Lower Mesopotamia, Mesopotamia, West Asia

History
- Built: c. 5500-5300 BC
- Abandoned: c. 600 BC

Site notes
- Area: At most 10 ha (25 acres)
- Excavation dates: 1855, 1918–1919, 1946–1949, 2019, 2022
- Archaeologists: John George Taylor, R. Campbell Thompson, H. R. Hall, Fuad Safar, Seton Lloyd, Franco D’Agostino, Philippe Quénet

UNESCO World Heritage Site
- Official name: Tell Eridu Archaeological Site
- Part of: Ahwar of Southern Iraq
- Criteria: Mixed: (iii)(v)(ix)(x)
- Reference: 1481-007
- Inscription: 2016 (40th Session)
- Area: 33 ha (0.13 sq mi)
- Buffer zone: 1,069 ha (4.13 sq mi)
- Coordinates: 30°49′1″N 45°59′45″E

Eridu (Sumerian: 𒉣𒆠, romanized: NUN.KI; Sumerian: eridug^{ki}; Akkadian: irîtu) was a Sumerian city located at Tell Abu Shahrain (Arabic: تل أبو شهرين), also Abu Shahrein or Tell Abu Shahrayn, an archaeological site in Lower Mesopotamia. It is located in Dhi Qar Governorate, Iraq, near the modern city of Basra. Eridu is traditionally considered the earliest city in southern Mesopotamia based on the Sumerian King List. Located 24 km (15 mi) south-southwest of the ancient site of Ur, Eridu was the southernmost of a conglomeration of Sumerian cities that grew around temples, almost in sight of one another. The city gods of Eridu were Enki and his consort Damkina. Enki, later known as Ea, was considered to have founded the city. His temple was called E-Abzu, as Enki was believed to live in Abzu, an aquifer from which all life was thought to stem. According to Sumerian temple hymns, another name for the temple of Ea/Enki was called Esira (Esirra).

"... The temple is constructed with gold and lapis lazuli, Its foundation on the nether-sea (apsu) is filled in. By the river of Sippar (Euphrates) it stands. O Apsu pure place of propriety, Esira, may thy king stand within thee. ..."

One of the religious quarters of Babylon, containing the temple called the Esagila as well as the temple of Annunitum, among others, was also named Eridu.

== Archaeology ==
=== Topography ===
Eridu is located on a natural hill in a basin approximately 15 miles (24 km) long and 20 feet (6.1 m) deep, which is separated from the Euphrates River by a sandstone ridge called the Hazem. This basin, the As Sulaybiyat Depression (formerly: Khor en-Nejeif), becomes a seasonal lake (Arabic: Sebkha) during the rainy season from November to April. During this period, it is filled by the discharge of the Wadi Khanega. Adjacent to eastern edge of the seasonal lake are the Hammar Marshes.

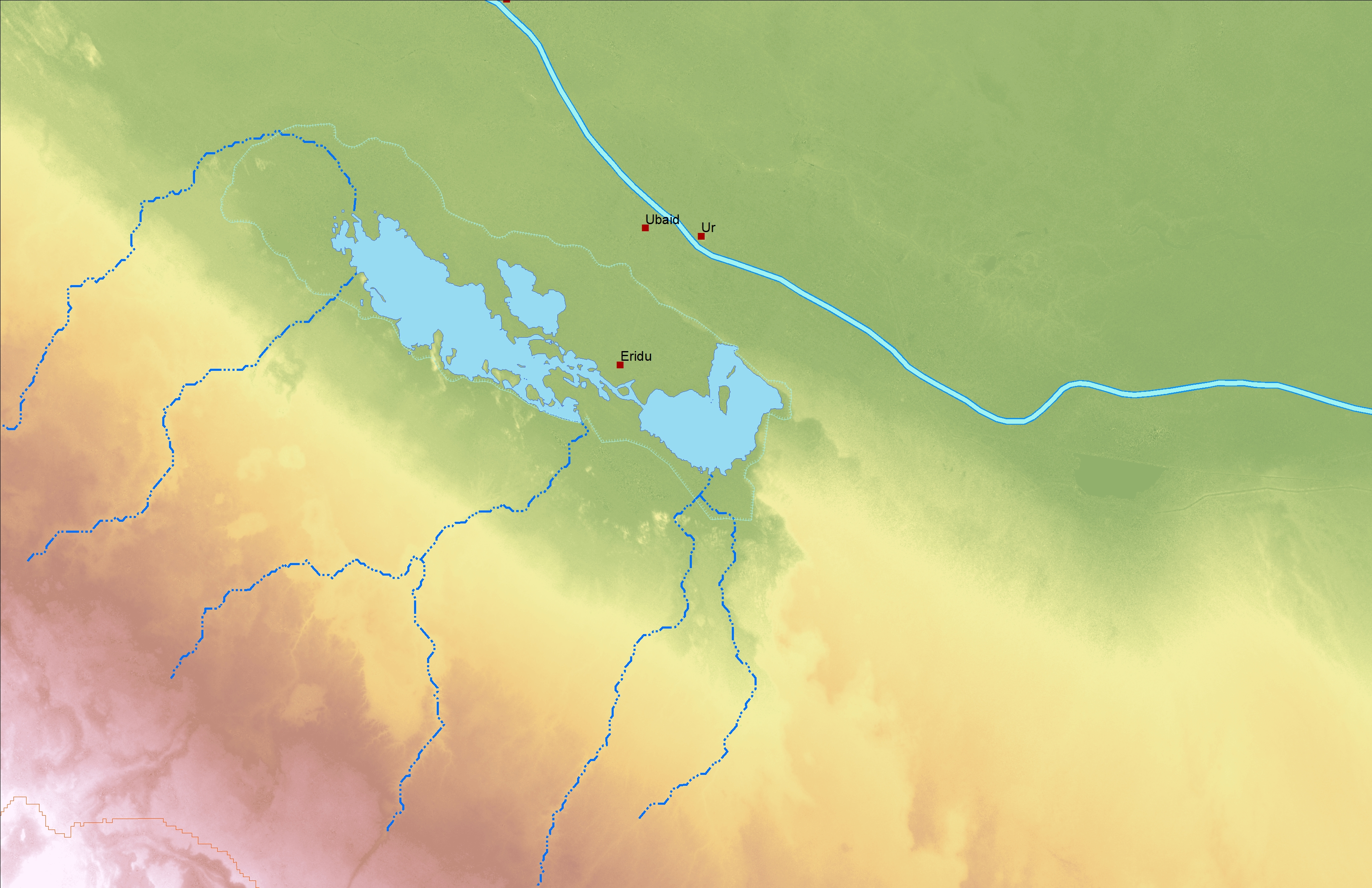
Eridu context c. 5000 BC

In the 3rd Millennium BC a canal, Id-edin-Eriduga (NUN)^{ki} "the canal of the Eridug plain", connected Eridu to the Euphrates River, which later shifted its course. The path of the canal is marked by several low tells with 2nd Millennium BC surface pottery and later burials. The site contains 8 mounds:

- Mound 1 – Abū Šahrain, 580 by 540 metres (1,900 ft × 1,770 ft) c. 18 hectares (c. 4.5 hectares within the perimeter of the temenos wall) in area NW to WE, 25 metres (82 ft) in height, Enki Temple, Ur III Ziggurat (É-u₆-nir) Sacred Area, Early Dynastic plano-convex bricks found, Ubaid Period cemetery (30°49’01.62” N, 45°59’46.57” E)
- Mound 2 – 350 by 350 metres (1,100 ft × 1,100 ft) c. 7 hectares in area, 4.3 metres (14 ft) in height, 1 km (0.62 mi) N of Abū Šahrain, Early Dynastic Palace, remnants of city wall built with plano-convex bricks
- Mound 3 – 300 by 150 metres (980 ft × 490 ft) c. 0.2 hectares in area, 2.5 m (8.2 ft) high, 2.2 km (1.4 mi) SSW of Abū Šahrain, Isin-Larsa pottery found
- Mound 4 – 600 by 300 metres (2,000 ft × 980 ft) c. 10 hectares in area, 2.5 km (1.6 mi) SW of Abū Šahrain, Kassite pottery found
- Mound 5 – 500 by 300 metres (1,600 ft × 980 ft) c. 25 hectares in area, 3 m (9.8 ft) high, 1.5 km (0.93 mi) SE of Abū Šahrain, Neo-Babylonian and Achaemenid periods
- Mound 6 – 300 by 200 metres (980 ft × 660 ft) in area, 2 m (6.6 ft) high, 2.5 km (1.6 mi) SW of Abū Šahrain
- Mound 7 – 400 by 200 metres (1,300 ft × 660 ft) in area, 1.5 m (4.9 ft) high, 3 km (1.9 mi) E of Abū Šahrai
- Mound 8 – Usalla, flat area, 8 km (5 mi) NW of Abū Šahrain, Hajj Mohammed and later Ubaid

In the early 1990s a dyke was constructed around Mounds 1-5 in preparation for the area being used as a reservoir. This defines the "Eridu Archaeological Area".

=== History of exploration ===
The site was initially excavated by John George Taylor, the British Vice-counsel at Basra, in 1855. Among the finds were inscribed bricks enabling the identification of the site as Eridu. Excavation on the main tell next occurred by R. Campbell Thompson from April 10 until May 8, 1918, and H. R. Hall from April 21 until May 8, 1919, who also conducted a survey in the area around the tell. An interesting find by Hall was a piece of manufactured blue glass which he dated to c. 2000 BC. The blue color was achieved with cobalt, long before this technique emerged in Egypt. This lump of glass is currently dated to the 21st century BC or even earlier, and is considered as perhaps the earliest such glass object in the world in the History of glass. It was produced during the Akkadian Empire or the early Ur III period.

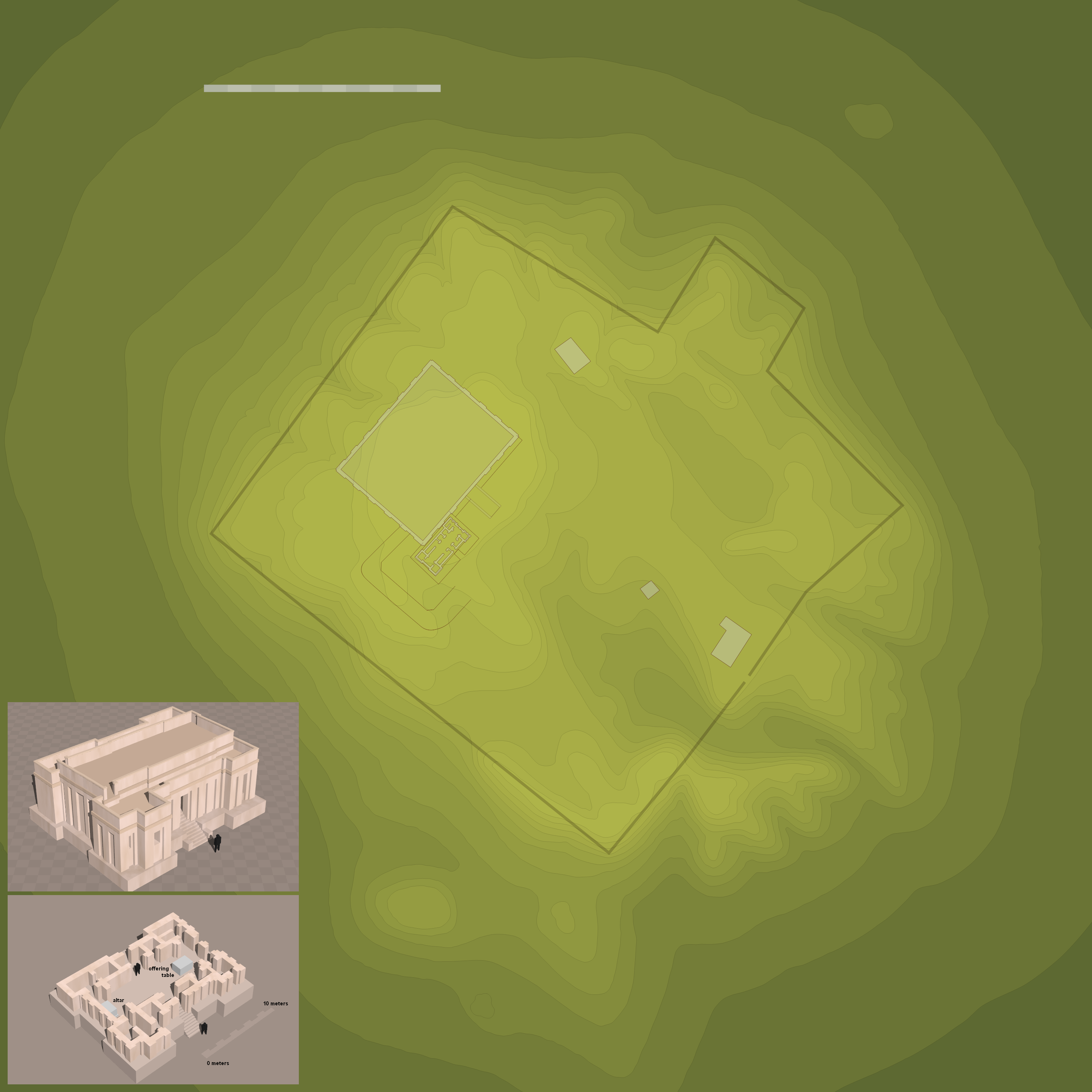
E-abzu temple of Eridu

Excavation there resumed from 1946 to 1949 under Fuad Safar and Seton Lloyd of the Iraqi Directorate General of Antiquities and Heritage. Among the finds were a Ubaid period terracotta boat model, complete with a socket amidship for a mast and hole for stays and rudder, bevel-rimmed bowls, and a "lizard type" figurine like those found in a sounding under the Royal Cemetery of Ur. Soundings in the cemetery showed it to have about 1000 graves, all from the end of the Ubaid period (Temple levels VI and VII). In a deep sounding to virgin soil on the southwest slope of Mound 1 they found a sequence of 17 Ubaid Period superseding temples and an Ubaid Period graveyard with 1000 graves of mud-brick boxes oriented to the southeast. The temple began as a 2 m × 3 m (6 ft 7 in × 9 ft 10 in) mud brick square with a niche. At Level XI it was rebuilt and eventually reached its final tripartite form in Level VI. In Ur III times a 300 square meter platform was constructed as a base for a ziggurat. These archaeological investigations showed that, according to A. Leo Oppenheim, "eventually the entire south lapsed into stagnation, abandoning the political initiative to the rulers of the northern cities", probably as a result of increasing salinity produced by continuous irrigation, and the city was abandoned in 600 BC. In 1990 the site was visited by A. M. T. Moore who found two areas of surface pottery kilns not noted by the earlier excavators.

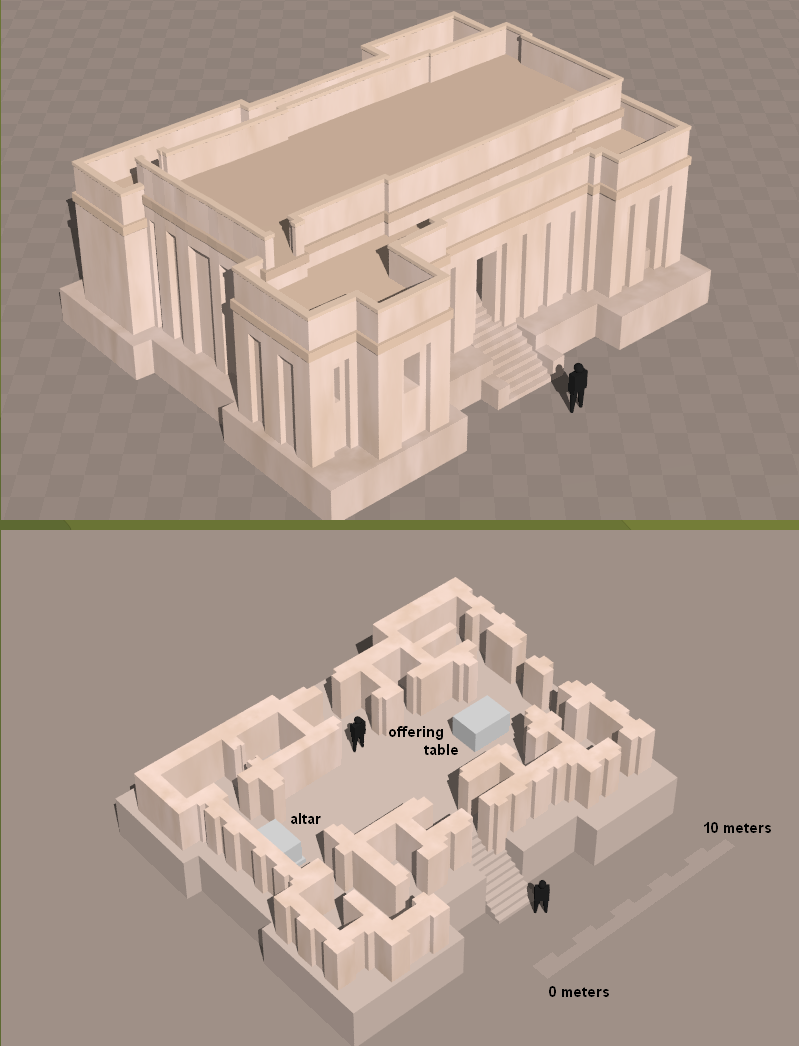
Large buildings, implying centralized government, started to be made. Eridu Temple, final Ubaid period

In March 2006, Giovanni Pettinato and S. Chiod from Rome's La Sapienza University claimed to have discovered 500 Early Dynastic historical and literary cuneiform tablets on the surface at Eridu "disturbed by an explosion". The tablets were said to be from 2600 to 2100 BC (rulers Eannatum to Amar-Sin) and be part of a library. A team was sent to the site by Iraq's State Board of Antiquities and Heritage which found no tablets, only stamped bricks from Eridu and surrounding sites such as Ur. Nor was there a permit to excavate at the site issued to anyone. At this point Pettinato stated that they had actually found 70 inscribed bricks. This turned out to be stamped bricks used to build the modern Eridu dig-house. The dig-house had been built using bricks from the demolished Leonard Woolley's expedition house at Ur (clearly spelled out in the 1981 Iraqi excavation report to avoid confusion to future archaeologists). Most of the bricks in question were returned to Ur in 1962 for use in restoration efforts.

In October 2014, Franco D’Agostino visited the site in preparation for the coming resumption of excavation, noting a number of inscribed Amar-Sin brick fragments on the surface. In 2019, excavations at Eridu were resumed by a joint Italian, French, and Iraqi effort which included the University of Rome La Sapienza and the University of Strasbourg, directed by F. D’Agostino and P. Quenet. A short survey found that occupational activity, including burials, extended for a wide area around most of the mounds. Excavation occurred on the southwestern slope of Mound 1 (renamed Site 1) both at the upper slope and at the base. Work has included producing new detail topographic and photogrammetric maps and is mainly focused on the Ubaid period cemetery and its associated Ubaid residential area. Another excavation season lasting two months was conducted in 2022. Work continued on the southwestern slope of Mound 1 and a new area was opened on the Kassite portion of Mound 4. The work on Mound 1 determined that the temenos wall dated to the Ur III Empire and the associated glacis to the Isin-Larsa Period. Aerial photogrammetry was extended to Mound 2. Further magnetometry surveying was conducted on Mound 4.

=== Architecture ===
==== Prehistoric Temple(s) ====
The urban nucleus of Eridu was Enki's temple, called House of the Aquifer in the oldest Sumerian texts (Cuneiform: 𒂍𒍪𒀊, E₂.ZU.AB; Sumerian: e₂-abzu; Akkadian: bītu apsû). In later texts the temple was called House of the Waters (Cuneiform: 𒂍𒇉, E₂.LAGAB×HAL; Sumerian: e₂-engur; Akkadian: bītu engurru). The name refers to Enki's realm. His consort Ninhursag had a nearby temple at Ubaid.

The origin of this temple goes back to a pre-historic sequence of buildings excavated during the 1946 to 1949 campaigns. This sequence starts at level XI in the table below, in the middle Ubaid period. Eridu is universally represented in Sumerian sources, especially in the King Lists, as the "First City" (See below in section "Mythology"). The sequence of "Palace-like" or "Temple-Like" buildings just mentioned seems to substantiate this claim as it appears to be the first occurrence of such structures in the region

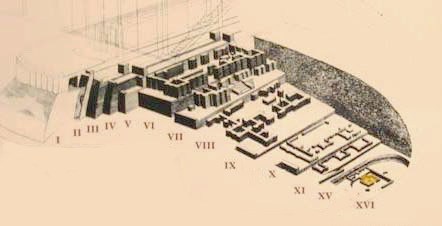
Pre-historic building layers in Eridu. The "Temple Sequence" starts at level XI (Salmon background rows in the table to the left)

| Level | Date (BC) | Period | Size (m) | Note |
|---|---|---|---|---|
| XVIII | 5300 | – | 3×0.3 | Sleeper walls |
| XVII | 5300–5000 | – | 2.8×2.8 | First cella |
| XVI | 5300–4500 | Early Ubaid | 3.5×3.5 | |
| XV | 5000–4500 | Early Ubaid | 7.3×8.4 | |
| XIV | 5000–4500 | Early Ubaid | – | No structure found |
| XIII | 5000–4500 | Early Ubaid | – | No structure found |
| XII | 5000–4500 | Early Ubaid | – | No structure found |
| XI | 4500–4000 | Ubaid | 4.5×12.6 | First platform |
| X | 4500–4000 | Ubaid | 5×13 | |
| IX | 4500–4000 | Ubaid | 4×10 | |
| VIII | 4500–4000 | Ubaid | 18×11 | |
| VII | 4000–3800 | Ubaid | 17×12 | |
| VI | 4000–3800 | Ubaid | 22×9 | |
| V | 3800–3500 | Early Uruk | – | Only platform remains |
| IV | 3800–3500 | Early Uruk | – | Only platform remains |
| III | 3800–3500 | Early Uruk | – | Only platform remains |
| II | 3500–3200 | Early Uruk | – | Only platform remains |
| I | 3200 | Early Uruk | – | Only platform remains |

==== Ur III Ziggurat ====
During the Ur III period, Ur-Nammu had a ziggurat built over the remains of previous temples. Aside from Enmerkar of Uruk (as mentioned in the Aratta epics), several later historical Sumerian kings are said in inscriptions found here to have ordered improvement or re-building works on the e-abzu temple, including Elili of Ur; Ur-Nammu, Shulgi and Amar-Sin of Ur-III, and Nur-Adad of Larsa.

== History ==
=== Chalcolithic Age ===
==== Ubaid period ====
Eridu is one of the earliest settlements in the region, founded c. 5400 BC during the early Ubaid period, at that time close to the Persian Gulf near the mouth of the Euphrates, although in modern times it is about 90 miles inland. Excavation has shown that the city was founded on a virgin sand dune site with no previous habitation. Eighteen superimposed mudbrick temples at the site (see above, section "Architecture") underlie the unfinished ziggurat of Amar-Sin (c. 2047–2039 BC). Levels XIX to VI were from the Ubaid period and Levels V to I were dated to the Uruk period.

During the Ubaid period the site extended out to an area of about 12 hectares (about 30 acres). Twelve neolithic clay tokens, the precursor to Proto-cuneiform, were found in the Ubaid levels of the site.

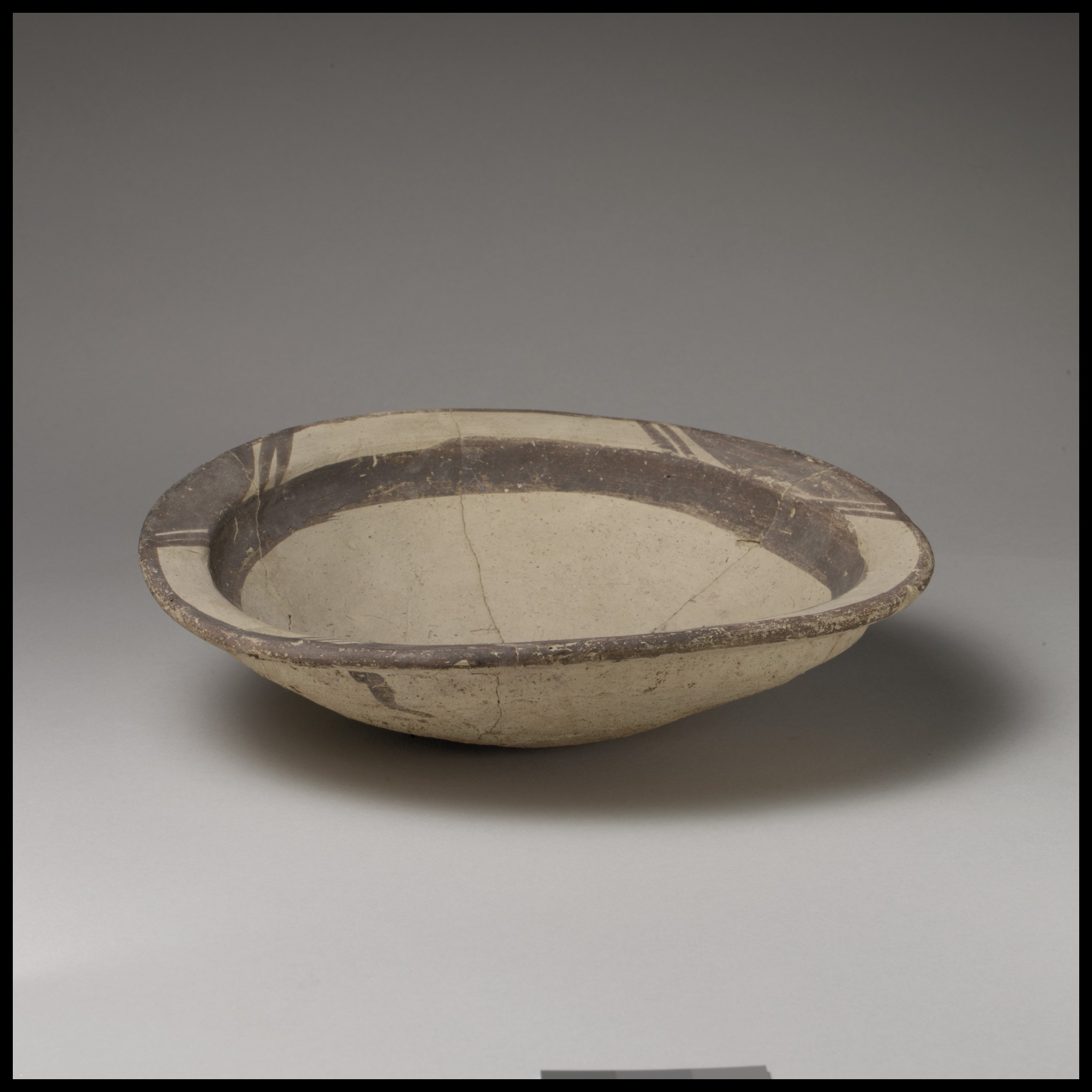
Bowl; mid 6th–5th millennium BC; ceramic; 6.99 cm; Tell Abu Shahrain; Metropolitan Museum of Art

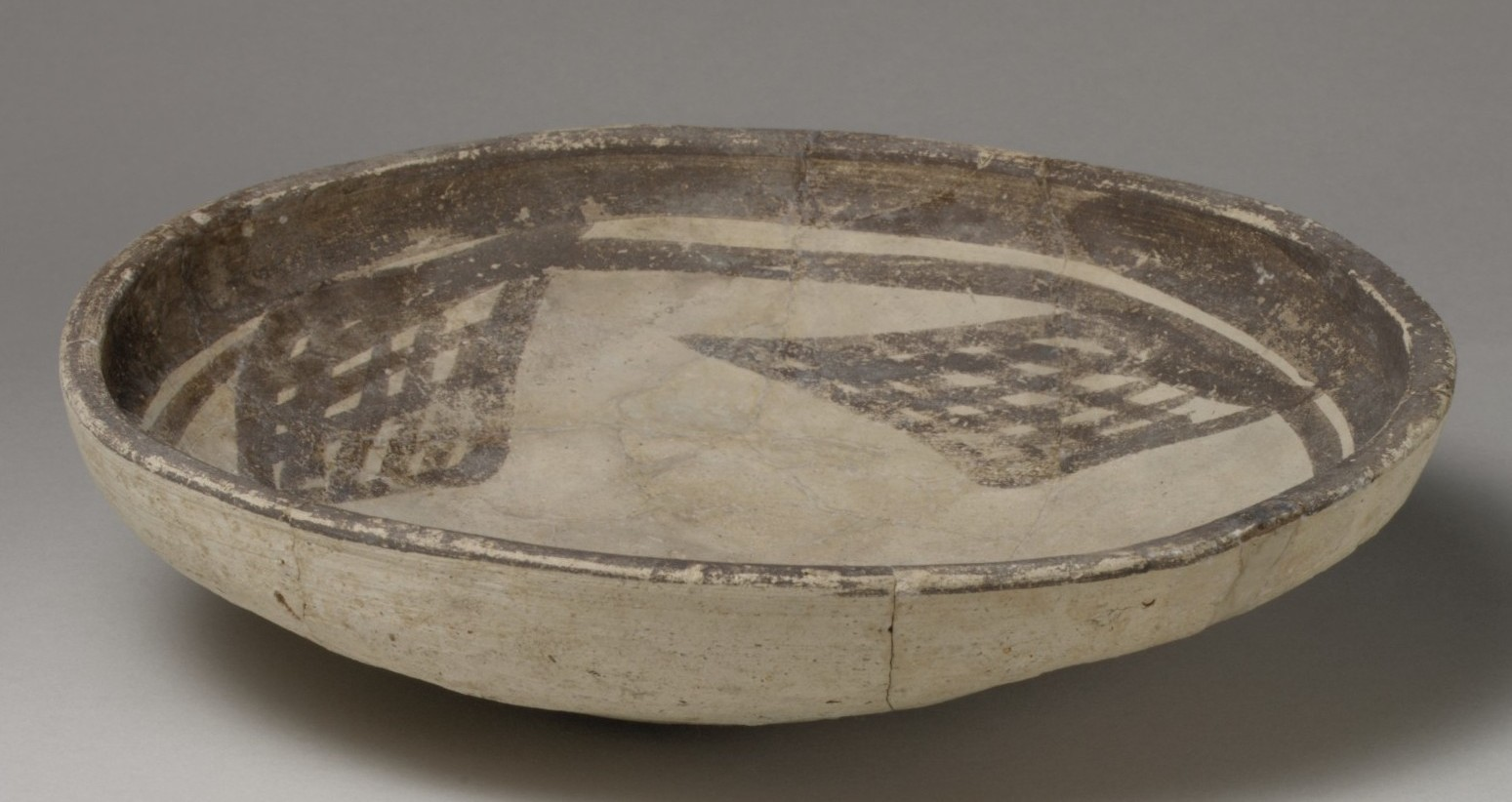
Bowl excavated in the Ubaid Cemetery at Eridu (Grave 134)

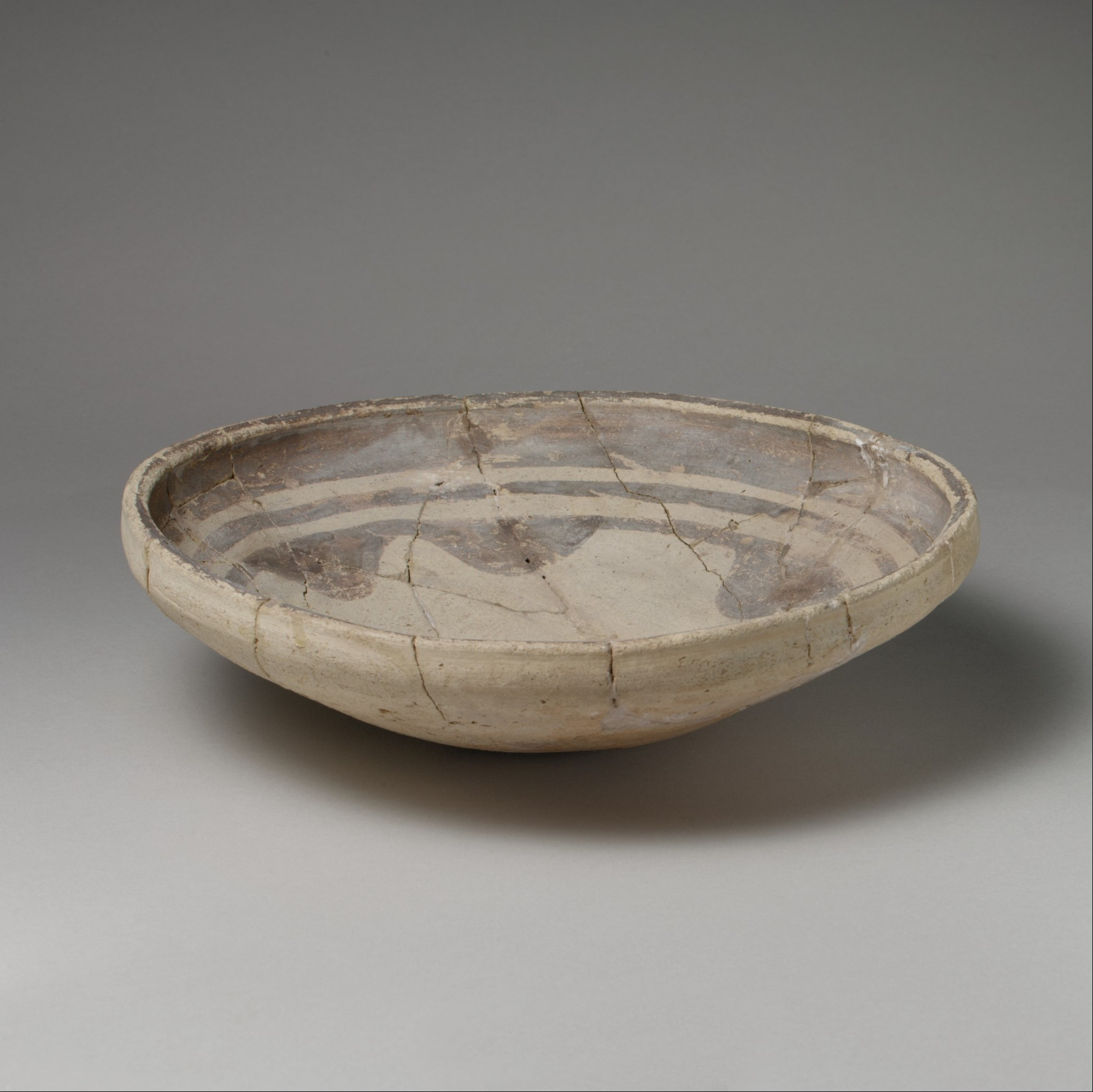
Bowl; mid 6th–5th millennium BC; ceramic; Tell Abu Shahrain; Metropolitan Museum of Art

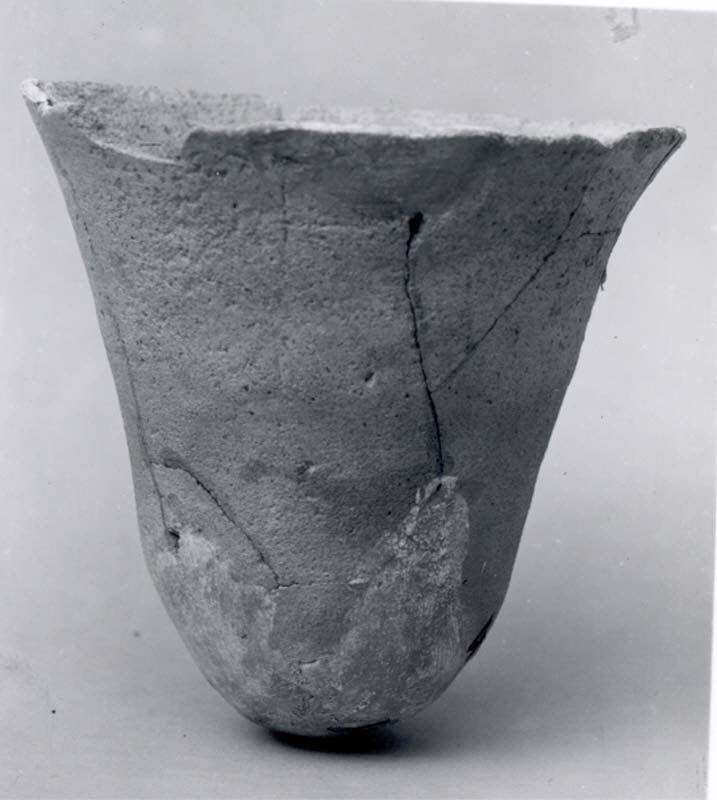
Cup; mid 6th–5th millennium BC; ceramic; 8.56 cm; Tell Abu Shahrain; Metropolitan Museum of Art

==== Uruk period ====
Significant habitation was found from the Uruk period with "non-secular" buildings being found in soundings. Uruk finds included decorative terracotta cones topped with copper, copper nails topped with gold, a pair of basalt stone lion statues, columns several meters in diameter coated with cones and gypsum, and extensive Uruk period pottery including beveled rim bowls, diagnostic for the period.

=== Early Bronze Age ===
==== Early Dynastic Period ====
Occupation increased in the Early Dynastic period with a monumental 100 m × 100 m (330 ft × 330 ft) palace being constructed. In Early Dynastic IIIA (c. 2750/2600-2500 BCE), an inscription of Elulu, a ruler of the First Dynasty of Ur (c. 2600 BC), was found at Eridu. In Early Dynastic IIIB (c. 2500-2350 BCE), a statue of the ruler Entemena of Lagash (c. 2400 BCE) reads: "he built Ab-zupasira for Enki, king of Eridu ...".

According to the excavators, construction of the Ur III ziggurat and associated buildings was preceded by the destruction of preceding construction and its use as leveling fill so no remains from that time were found. At a small mound 1 kilometer north of Eridu two Early Dynastic III palaces were found, with an enclosure wall. The palaces measured 45 meters by 65 meters with 2.6 meter wide walls and were constructed in the standard Early Dynastic period method of plano-convex bricks laid in a herringbone fashion.

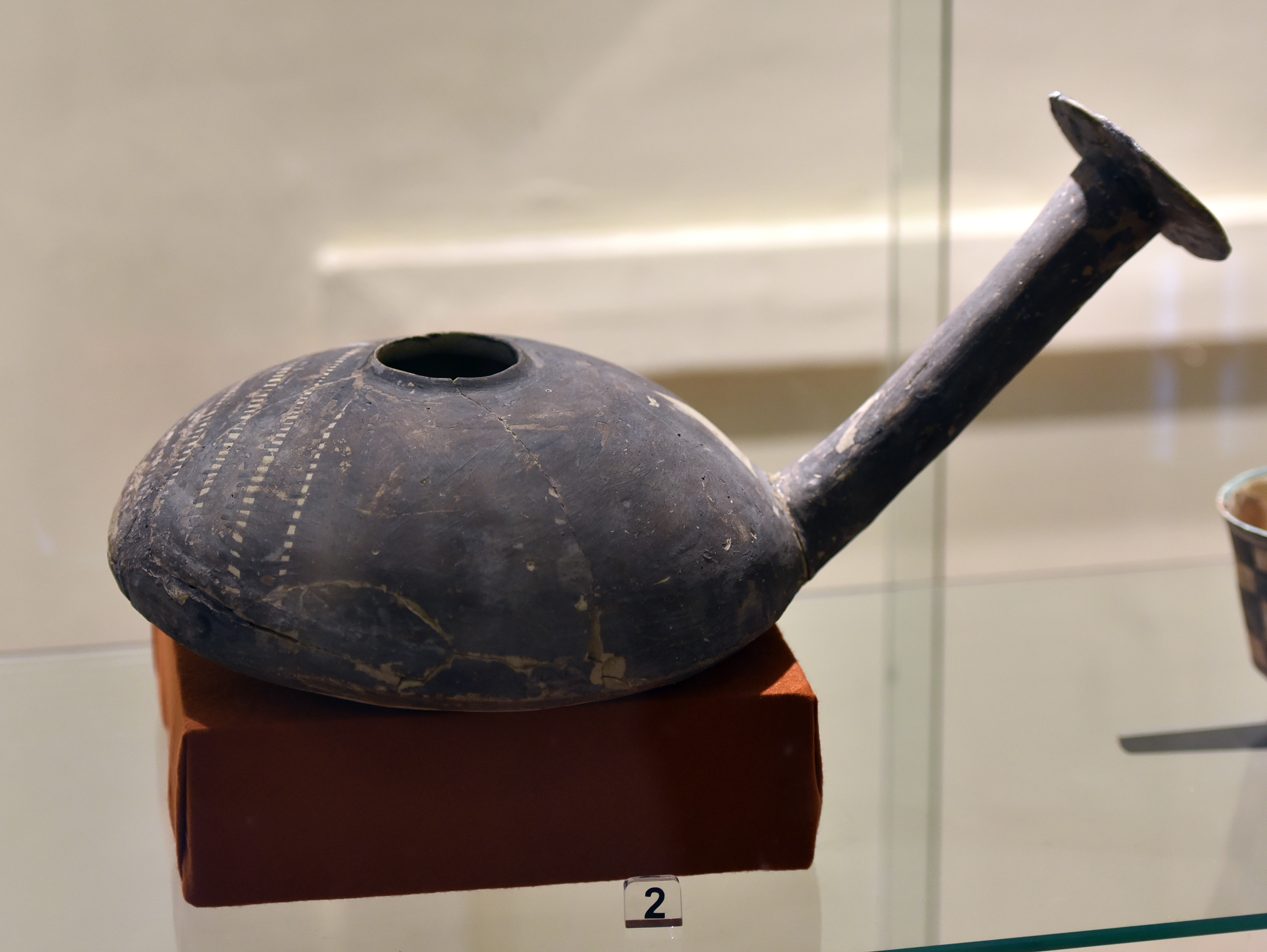

==== Akkadian period ====
In the Akkadian period (c. 2350-2150 BCE), there may have been an occupation gap or overbuilt by the Ur III rulers. Manishtushu: Fragmentary inscriptions on black diorite vessels found at Eridu indicate he dedicated luxury objects to the temple of Enki (E-Abzu). Naram-Sin: He is explicitly mentioned in the Bassetki Statue inscription as receiving the "blessing" of Ea (Enki) in Eridu, along with other major city gods, to declare himself the "God of his City."

==== Ur III period ====
Eridu was active during the Third Dynasty of Ur (22nd to 21st century BC) and royal building activity is known from inscribed bricks, notably those from the ziggurat of Ur-Nammu, marked "Ur-Nammu, king of Ur, the one who built the temple of the god Enki in Eridu." Three Third Dynasty rulers designated Year Names based on the appointment of an en(tu)-priestess (high priestess) of the temple of Enki in Eridu, the highest religious office in the land at that time. In each the first two cases it was also used as the succeeding Year Name.

- Sulgi Year 28 – "Year the szita-priest-who-intercedes-for-Szulgi, the son of Szulgi, the strong man, the king of Ur, the king of the four corners of the universe, was installed as en-priest of Enki in Eridu"
- Amar-Sin Year 8 – "Year (Ennune-kiag-Amar-Sin) Ennune-the beloved (of Amar-Sin, was installed as en-priestess of Enki in Eridu)"
- Ibbi-Sin Year 11 – "Year the szita-priest who prays piously for Ibbi-Sin was chosen by means of the omens as en-priest of Enki in Eridu"
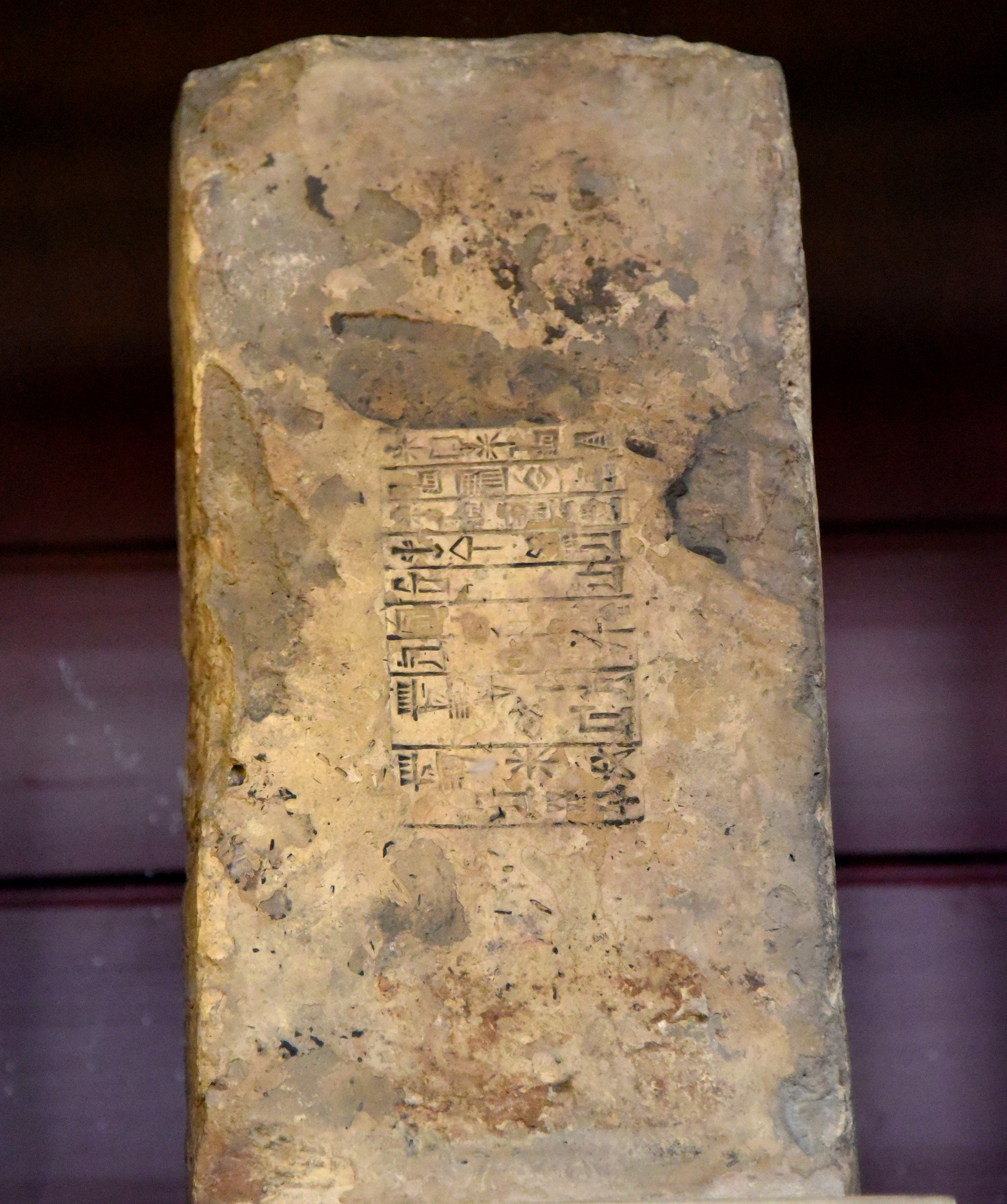
Fired clay brick stamped with the name of Amar-Sin, Ur III, from Eridu, currently housed in the British Museum

In this period, at nearby Ur, a temple of Ishtar of Eridu was built by Lagash's ruler Ur-Baba. The Ur III ruler Ur-Nammu) also recorded building a temple of Ishtar of Eridu at Ur which is assumed to have been a rebuild.

=== Middle Bronze Age ===
==== Isin-Larsa period ====
After the fall of Ur III the site was occupied and active during the Isin-Larsa period (early 2nd Millennium BC) as evidenced by a Year Name of Nur-Adad, ruler of Larsa "Year the temple of Enki in Eridu was built" and prior texts of Isin rulers Ishbi-Erra and Ishme-Dagan showing control over Eridu. Inscribed construction bricks of Nur-Adad have also been found at Eridu.

===== Lament for Eridu =====
The fall of early Mesopotamia cities and empires was typically believed to be the result of falling out of favor with the gods. A genre called City Laments developed during the Isin-Larsa period, of which the Lament for Ur is the most famous. These laments had a number of sections (kirugu) of which only fragments have been recovered. The Lament for Eridu describes the fall of that city.

Its king stayed outside his city as if it were an alien city. He wept bitter tears. Father Enki stayed outside his city as if it were an alien city. He wept bitter tears. For the sake of his harmed city, he wept bitter tears. Its lady, like a flying bird, left her city. The mother of E-maḫ, holy Damgalnuna, left her city. The divine powers of the city of holiest divine powers were overturned. The divine powers of the rites of the greatest divine powers were altered. In Eridug everything was reduced to ruin, was wrought with confusion.

==== Old Babylonian period ====
This continued in the Old Babylonian period with Hammurabi stating in his 33rd Year Name "Year Hammu-rabi the king dug the canal (called) 'Hammu-rabi is abundance to the people', the beloved of An and Enlil, established the everlasting waters of plentifulness for Nippur, Eridu, Ur, Larsa, Uruk and Isin, restored Sumer and Akkad which had been scattered, overthrew in battle the army of Mari and Malgium and caused Mari and its territory and the various cities of Subartu to dwell under his authority in friendship"

=== Late Bronze Age ===
In an inscription of Kurigalzu I (c. 1375 BC), a ruler of the Kassite dynasty one of his epitaphs is "[he one who ke]eps the sanctuary in Eridu in order".

=== Iron Age ===
An inscription of the Second Sealand Dynastic ruler Simbar-shipak (c. 1021–1004 BCE) mentions a priest of Eridu.

==== Neo-Assyrian period ====
The Neo-Assyrian emperor Sargon II (722–705 BCE) awarded andurāru-status (described as "a periodic reinstatement of goods and persons, alienated because of want, to their original status") to Eridu.

==== Neo-Babylonian period ====
The Neo-Babylonian ruler Nebuchadnezzar II (605–562 BC) built at Eridu as evidenced by inscribed bricks found there.

== Mythology ==
In some, but not all, versions of the Sumerian King List, Eridu is the first of five cities where kingship was received before a flood came over the land. The list mentions two rulers of Eridu from the Early Dynastic period, Alulim and Alalngar.

[nam]-lugal an-ta èd-dè-a-ba
[eri]du^{ki} nam-lugal-la
eridug^{ki} a₂-lu-lim lugal
mu 28800 i₃-ak
a₂-lal₃-ĝar mu 36000 i₃-ak

Translation:

When kingship from heaven was lowered,
the kingship was in Eridu
In Eridug, Alulim became king;
he ruled
for 28800 years.
Alaljar ruled for 36000 years

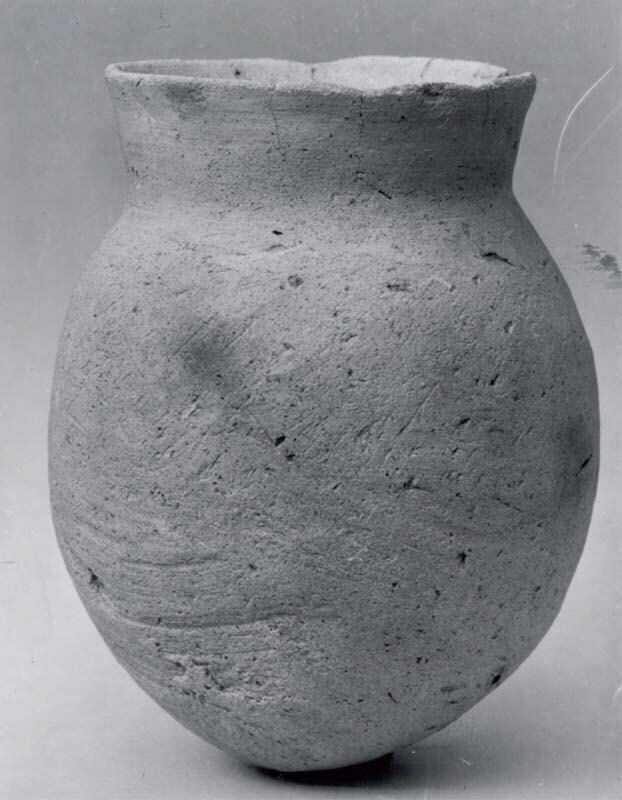
Jar; mid 6th–5th millennium BC; ceramic; 15.24 cm; Tell Abu Shahrain; Metropolitan Museum of Art

In Sumerian mythology, Eridu was the home of the Abzu temple of the god Enki, the Sumerian counterpart of the Akkadian god Ea, god of deep waters, wisdom and magic. Like all the Sumerian and Babylonian gods, Enki/Ea began as a local god who, according to the later cosmology, came to share the rule of the cosmos with Anu and Enlil. His kingdom was the sweet waters that lay below earth (Sumerian ab=water; zu=far). The bright star Canopus was known to the ancient Mesopotamians and represented the city of Eridu in the Three Stars Each Babylonian star catalogues and later around 1100 BC on the MUL.APIN tablets. Canopus was called MUL.NUN^{KI} by the Babylonians, which translates as "star of the city of Eridu". From most southern city of Mesopotamia, Eridu, there is a good view to the south, so that about 6000 years ago due to the precession of the Earth's axis the first rising of the star Canopus in Mesopotamia could be observed only from there at the southern meridian at midnight. In the city of Ur this was the case only 60 years later.

In the flood myth tablet found in Ur, how Eridu and Alulim were chosen by gods as first city and first priest-king is described in more detail. The following is the English translation of the tablet:

(Obverse)
1 They (the chief deities) created humanity
2 After the [animals/vermin?] were proliferating below/from the earth in unison
3 They made livestock and quadrupeds as fitting things in the steppe(eden-na)
4 In the high steppe ... joyous plants broadly
5 At that time, the canal was not dug ...
6 The dike and ditch [were not dredged(?) ...]
7 The ox ... the plow/farmer/furrow(?) ...
8 The lands ... a single track ...
9 Humanity ... their eyes/faces ... [rain?]
10 Šakkan/Šumugan [did not go out(?)] in the desert ...
11 Weaving the cap/headcloth(?) ...
12 Humanity ...
13 At that time, the snake was not present, [the scorpion was not present ...]
14 The lion was not present, [the hyena was not present ...]
15 The dog and wolf were not present ...
16 Humanity [had no opponent ...]
17 Fear and [gooseflesh(?) were not present ...]
18 ...
19 The king ...
20 ...

Translation:

(Reverse)
1 First ... were giving [Eridu or Ku’ara?] to Asalluhi,
2 Second ... were giving [Bad-tibira to the nugig midwife?],
3 Third ... were giving [Larak[ to Pabilsaĝ,
4 Fourth ... were giving [Sippar to Utu?]
5 Fifth ... were giving Š[uruppak?] to [Sud?].
6 Those cities .. their settlements ...
7 An, Enlil, [Enki?] and Ninhursaĝ
8 Among(?) those cities, Eridu .. they established at the front/as the leader(?)
9 They led(?) a man who was lying(?) among its vast and many people ...
10 An, Enlil, and Enki, the father(s) of the gods(?)
11 They chose Alulim/the "seed of the red deer" for the shepherdship of the entirety of the many people
12 They named him(!) Alulim/named the "seed of the red deer" ...
13 After they served according to the command to check thusly/forever after(?)
14 [So that?] humanity, whoever possessed a name, were grasping his feet (in submission)/following his path(?)
15 They put both (capital) offense and sin(?) in his hand
16 was giving ... to him
17 ...
18 ...

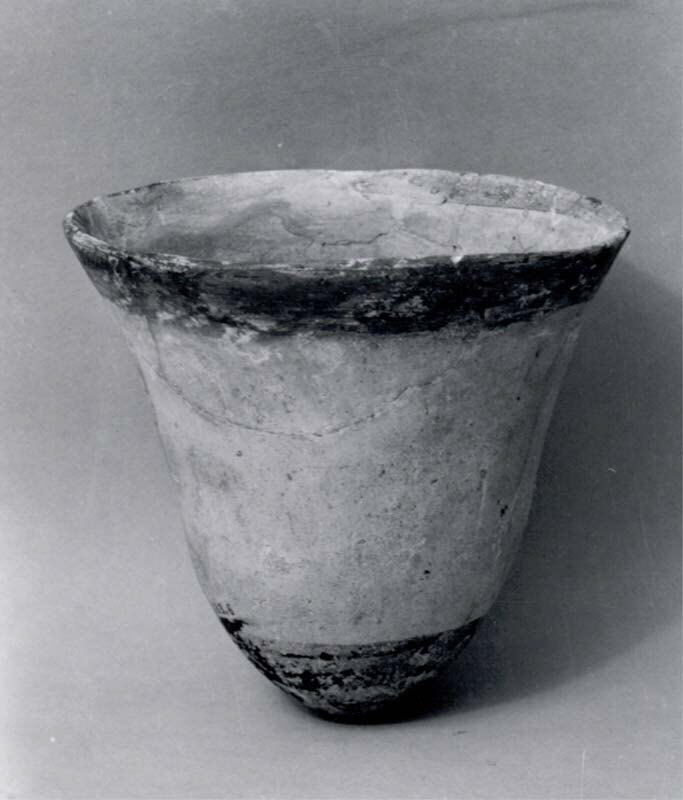
Cup; mid 6th–5th millennium BC; ceramic; 9.53 cm; Tell Abu Shahrain; Metropolitan Museum of Art

Adapa, a man of Eridu, is depicted as an early culture hero. Although earlier tradition, Me-Turan/Tell-Haddad tablet, describes Adapa as postdiluvian ruler of Eridu, in late tradition, Adapa came to be viewed as Alulim's vizier, and he was considered to have brought civilization to the city as the sage of King Alulim.

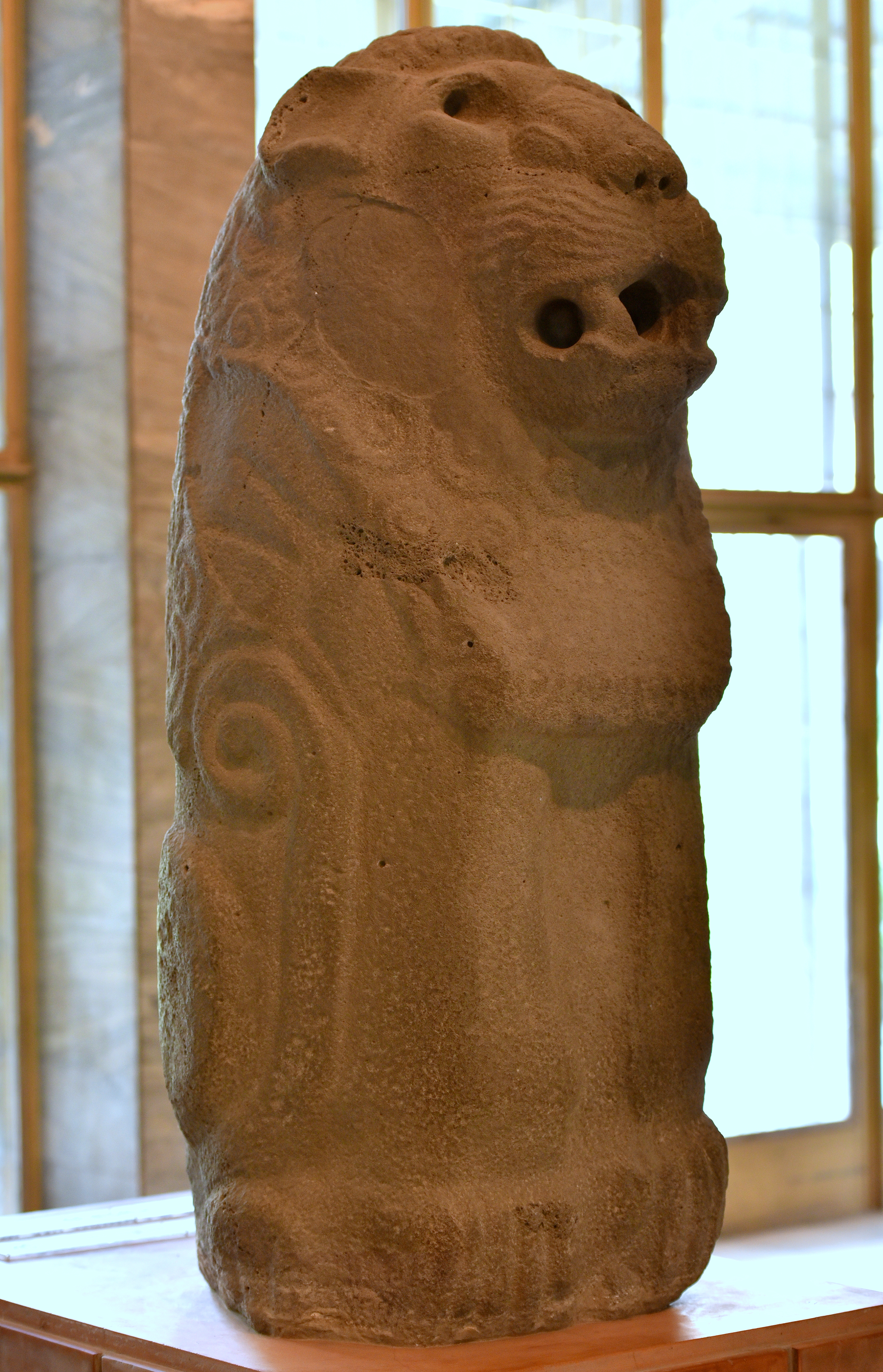
Statue of a standing lion from Eridu, Iraq, c. mid-3rd millennium BC

The stories of Inanna, goddess of Uruk, describe how she had to go to Eridu in order to receive the gifts of civilization. At first Enki, the god of Eridu, attempted to retrieve these sources of his power but later willingly accepted that Uruk now was the centre of the land.

== List of rulers ==
The following list should not be considered complete:

| # | Depiction | Ruler | Succession | Title | Approx. dates |
|---|---|---|---|---|---|
Predynastic Sumer / Early Dynastic I period (c. 2900 – c. 2700 BC)
"After the kingship descended from heaven, the kingship was in Eridu." — Sumerian King List (SKL)
| 1 | | Alulim 𒀉𒇻𒅆 | | King of Sumer King of Eridu | fl. c. 2874 BC (28800–67200 years) |
| 1 | Is mentioned in the Weld-Blundell Prism (W-B 44) version of the SKL (this version of the SKL was most likely written temp. of Suen-magir c. 1800 BC); Said on the SKL to have held the title of, "King" of not just Eridu; but, to have held the "Kingship" over all of Sumer; The Uruk List of Kings and Sages (ULKS) version of the SKL pairs him up with an apkallu (an apkallu was a sage in Sumerian literature and religion—the first apkallu was named Adapa and he was paired up with Alulim; additionally, Adapa has been compared with the Biblical figure Adam) | | | | |
| 2 | | Alalngar 𒀉𒋭𒃻 | Brother of Alulim (?) | King of Sumer King of Eridu | reigned c. 2866 BC (36000 years) |
| 2 | Historicity uncertain; Is mentioned in the Dynastic Chronicle version of the SKL (this version of the SKL was most likely written temp. of Nabonassar c. 740 BC); The ULKS (written c. 165 BC) pairs him up with an apkallu (Uanduga) | | | | |
"2 kings; they ruled for 64800 years. Then Eridu fell and the kingship was taken to Bad-tibira." — SKL
| 3 | | Amelon 𒁹𒄠𒈨𒇻𒀭𒈾 | | King of Sumer King of Eridu | r. c. 2900 BC (46800 years) |
| 3 | Historicity uncertain; Is mentioned in Berossus’ version of the SKL (the Babyloniaca was written c. 290 BC); The ULKS pairs him up with an apkallu (Enmeduga) | | | | |

== See also ==
- Abzu
- Cities of the Ancient Near East
- Eridu Genesis
- Lake Hammar
- Tepe Gawra
