= Anonymous work =

Creation of an unknown or deliberately unnamed person

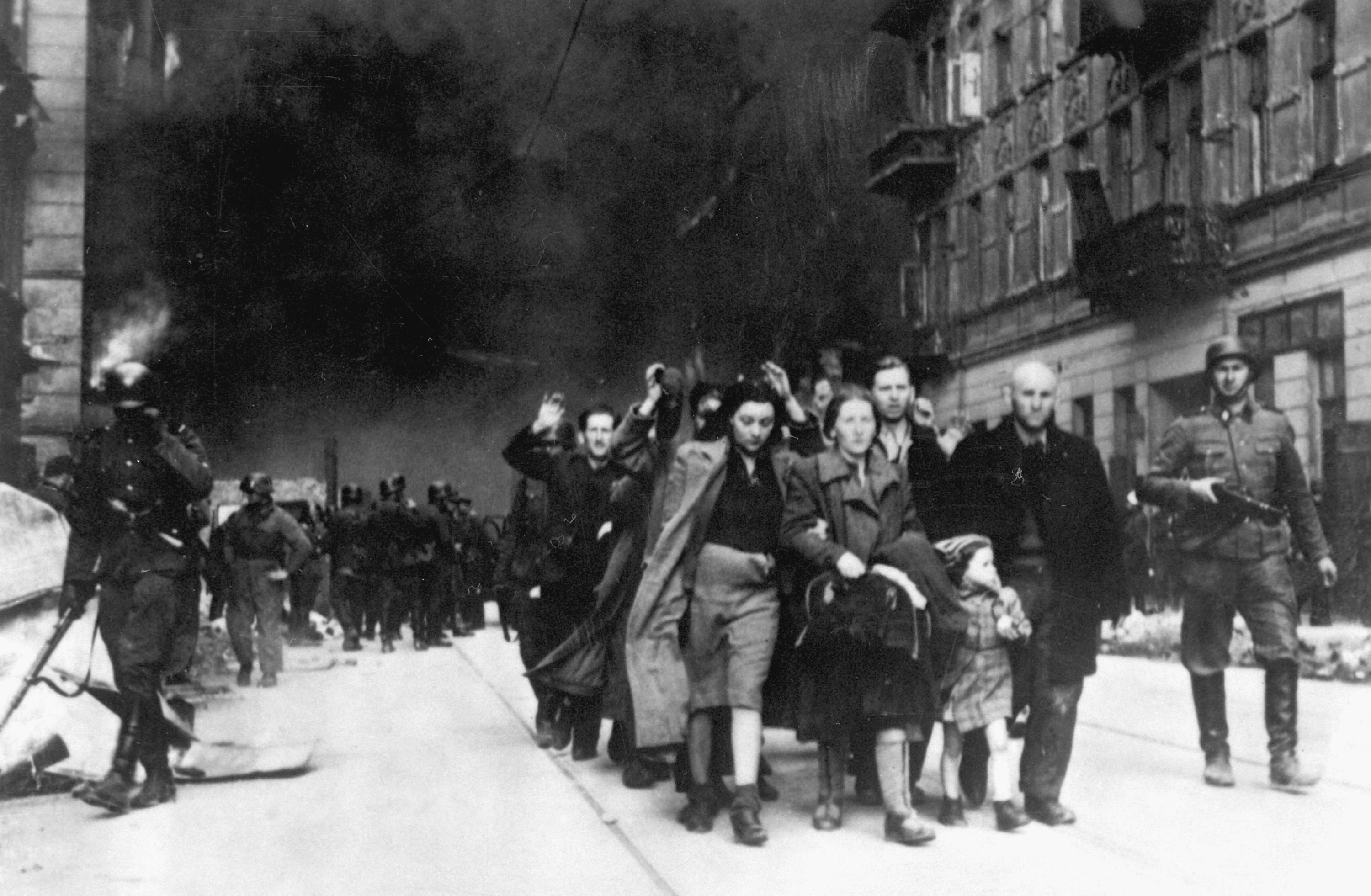
This image of the Warsaw Ghetto Uprising by an anonymous photographer was chosen as the most famous picture by The Photograph Book (1997) (ISBN 0-7148-3937-X), a book of 500 photographs by 500 famous photographers.

Anonymous works are creative works, such as art or literature, that have an anonymous, undisclosed, or unknown creator or author. In the case of very old works, the author's name may simply be lost over the course of history and time. There are a number of reasons anonymous works arise. Examples include Beowulf and The Arabian Nights.

== Legal status ==
In the United States, anonymous work is legally defined as "a work on the copies or phonorecords of which no natural person is identified as author."

In copyright law, anonymous works are treated differently than works with known authors. According to the U.S. Copyright Office, anonymous works are protected for 95 years from the year of first publication or 120 years from creation, whichever expires first.

More broadly, anonymous speech raises fundamental questions at the intersection of literature, law, and politics, influencing debates over freedom of expression and accountability.

== Historical backgrounds ==
Throughout much of human history, individual authorship was not emphasized as it is today. In ancient and medieval societies, creative works were often seen as communal or sacred contributions rather than personal expressions. For example, epic poems like Beowulf and religious texts were transmitted orally or collectively authored, making the original creator difficult to identify.

During the Victorian era, many women writers adopted male or gender-neutral pseudonyms to circumvent prevailing gender biases and gain literary recognition.

== Reasons ==
Creators may choose to remain anonymous for a variety of reasons:

- Political safety: Authors, artists, or activists may conceal their identity to avoid political persecution, censorship, or retaliation.
- Social and cultural norms: Certain eras or societies valued humility or communal authorship, encouraging anonymity.
- Artistic intent: Some artists intentionally avoid personal recognition to focus the audience's attention on the work itself rather than the creator.
- Legal or contractual limitations: In some cases, anonymity provides protection in creative markets, helping artists balance privacy and transparency.

== See also ==
- Anonymous post
- List of anonymously published works
- List of works published under a pseudonym
- List of anonymous masters
- Notname
