= Shimut-wartash I =

- Sukkal

King of Elam
- Reign: c. 1790 – c. 1763 BC
- Predecessor: Shirukduh
- Successor: Siwe-Palar-Khuppak

Shimut-wartash I was an Elamite king, and a member of the Sukkalmah dynasty, the ruling house of Elam during the middle Bronze Age.

== Reign ==
Shimut-wartash was the oldest son of Shirukduh, his predecessor. He was one of the co-regents, or Sukkals of Elam, along with his other brothers, Siwe-Palar-Khuppak and Kuduzulush I.

A tablet found in Mari suggests that Shimut-wartash was captured in the midst of battle, and killed.
