= Ebarat =

Ebarat is the name of two Old Elamite kings:

- Ebarat I, a 22nd or 21st century BC king of the Shimashki Dynasty
- Ebarat II, a 22nd or 21st century BC king of the Shimashki Dynasty, the founder of Ebartid (Yabrid) dynasty
