= Indattu-Inshushinak II =

Elamite king

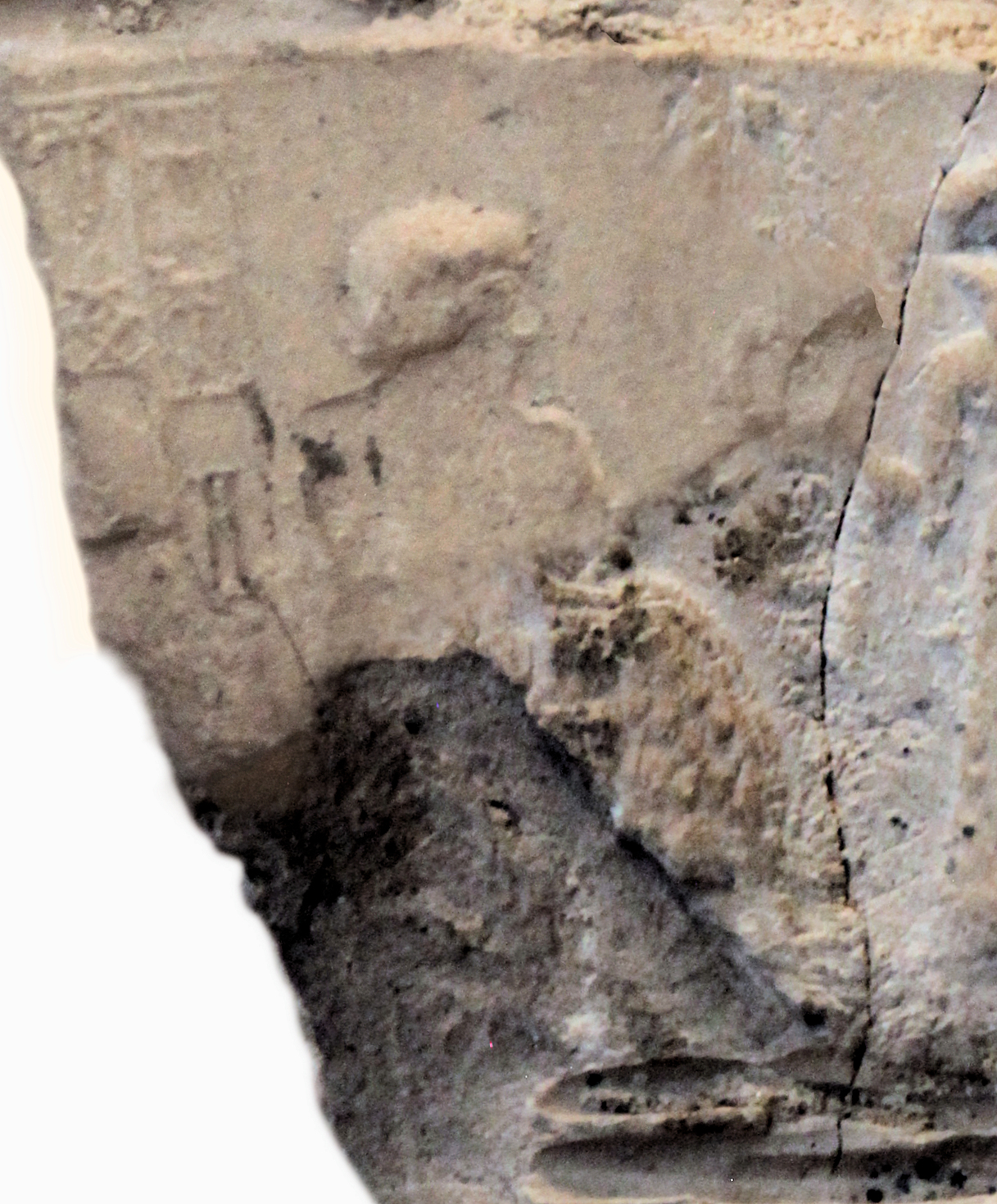
- Indattu-Inshushinak II offering an ax to Kuk-Shimut, one of his high officials

King of Elam
- Reign: c. 1965 BC
- Father: Tan-Ruhurater I

Indattu-Inshushinak II (fl. c. 1965 BC), often referred to by the shortened name Indattu or Idaddu II, was the 10th king of Elam who came from the dynasty of Shimashki, a city of unknown location.

== Early life ==
Son of a previous king, named Tan-Ruhurater I, Indattu was first the ishakku (governor), of the city of Susa. He refurbished a wall at the Uruanna temple in Susa, and made inscriptions detailing his restoration of the wall, claiming to have gained the favor of Inshushinak, the city's patron god.

Indattu appears to have had a vigorous administration, as seals dedicated to him belong to such officials as judge Kuk-Shimut and scribe Ishmenni.

== As king of Elam ==
After the rule of Eparti II, Indattu was acclaimed to the kingship of Shimashki, a city which held hegemony over Susa, the capital of Elam. As king, he attacked Zidanu and Shindi-libbu, according to year-names, as well as built a temple to Ishtar.

=== War with Larsa ===
For reasons unknown, Gungunum, the king of Larsa, attacked Pashime, a city in Indattu's control, sparking chaos, and causing the beginning of the decline of Shimashki rule over Elam. After this point, Indattu disappears from history. It is at about this time that the Shimashki dynasty begins to be gradually replaced by the Sukkalmah in Susa.
