= Shilhaha =

Elamite ruler

King of Elam
- Reign: c. 1950 BC

Shilhaha (Elamite si-il-ha-ha, or shi-il-ha-ha, ^{m}shi-il-ha-ha, cf. middle-Elamite shilha ‘strong’; fl. c. 1950 BC) was an Elamite ruler of the 20th century BC (Middle Chronology). He was first to be attested as sukkalmah in Elam, effectively founding the Sukkalmah Dynasty. At least 11 rulers of this dynasty used the phrase “descendant of Šilhaha” (ruhušak) in their titles as evidence of their legitimacy. Inscriptions on a bronze “gunagi” vessel and on Atta-Hušu cylindroid show that he was contemporary of Ebarat II, one of the last kings of Shimashki.

== Sources ==
- Potts, D. T., The Archaeology of Elam, Cambridge University Press, 2016.
- Katrien De Graef (2012). "Dual power in Susa: Chronicle of a transitional period from Ur III via Šimaški to the Sukkalmas." Bulletin of the School of Oriental and African Studies, 75, pp 525–546
