= Apum =

Amorite Kingdom

Apum Apum
- c. 1776 BCE–c. 1728 BCE
- Capital: Apum; Shubat-Enlil
- Government: Monarchy
  - c. 1776 BCE: Turum-Natki (first)
  - c. 1728 BCE: Yakun-Asar (last)
- Historical era: Bronze Age
  - Established: c. 1776 BCE
  - Disestablished: c. 1728 BCE
Preceded by	Succeeded by
Kingdom of Upper Mesopotamia	Eshnunna
- Today part of: Syria

Apum was an ancient Amorite kingdom located in the upper Khabur Valley, modern northeastern Syria. It was involved in the political and military struggle that dominated the first half of the 18th century BC and led to the establishment of the Babylonian Empire. Apum was incorporated into Babylon in 1728 BC and subsequently disappeared from the records.

== History ==
The majority of the kingdom inhabitants were Amorites. Originally, Apum was a small city perhaps located in the vicinity of modern-day Qamishli. The kingdom was attested for the first time in the Archives of Mari (c. 1774 BC). At the time of its attestation, Apum was already in control of the old capital of Amorite Kingdom of Upper Mesopotamia ruler Shamshi-Adad I, Shubat-Enlil, which became Apum's capital. In 1771 BC, Apum received a warning from Mari's monarch Zimri-Lim regarding an Eshnunnite attack, however, the Apumites were unable to resist and their capital was occupied by the invading force.

Following the Eshnunnite main force departure, Apum's king Zuzu became a vassal to Eshnnuna and was entrusted in commanding the Eshnunnite garrison. Soon after, Apum was attacked by the neighboring kingdom of Qattara who occupied the capital, but was evicted by the Eshnunnites. Afterwards, Apum was overrun by an Elamite invasion led by a general named Kunnam, who shared the power with the Apumite king Haya-Abum, who was a vassal of Mari. The Elamites left in 1765 BC, and the capital of Apum was invaded by the kingdom of Andarig. However, it is certain that by 1750 BC, Apum's dynasty was in firm control over its capital, after an alliance with the kingdom of Kurda that drove the Andarigites out. Apum came to an end after the invasion of the Babylonian king Samsu-Iluna in 1728 BC. The 23rd year name of Samsu-Iluna reads:

"Year in which Samsu-iluna, the king, by the awesome strength given to him by the god Enlil destroyed the wall of Šehnā, the capital of the land of Apum, Zarhāanum, Putrā, Šušā and Iakūn-[Ašar …]…"

In a letter to Mari (in Zimri-Lim year 4) it is reported that Turum-Natki, the ruler of Apum had died, and that Qarni-Lim, ruler of Andarig had installed the son of Turum-Natki in that office.

"Qarni-Lim buried Turum-Natki in Apum. He gathered the kings nearby Shubat-Enlil and they wept for Turum-Natki—Qarni-Lim fell to the ground (in mourning)! And they installed the son of Turum-Natki to kingship at Shubat-Enlil."

== Rulers ==
King	Reigned	Comments
Turum-Natki
Zuzu	c. 1770 BC	Son of Turum-Natki, evicted by a rebellion after a year of ruling.
Haya-Abum		Brother of Zuzu, eventually killed by the Elamites.
Mutiya	-1750 BC	Son of a certain Halum-Piyumu, whose occupation is unknown.
Till-Abnu		Son of Dari-Epuh who is described as king and might have ruled before Mutiya.
Yakun-Asar	-1728 BC	Brother of Till-Abnu. Killed by Babylonian king Samsu-iluna

== See also ==
- Amorite language
- Hurrians
