= Kindattu =

6th king of the Shimashki Dynasty

Kindattu 𒆠𒅔𒁕𒌅

King of Elam
- Reign: c. 2028 – c. 2001 BC
- Predecessor: Possibly Lurak-luhhan
- Successor: Possibly Indattu-Inshushinak I
- Died: c. 2001 BC

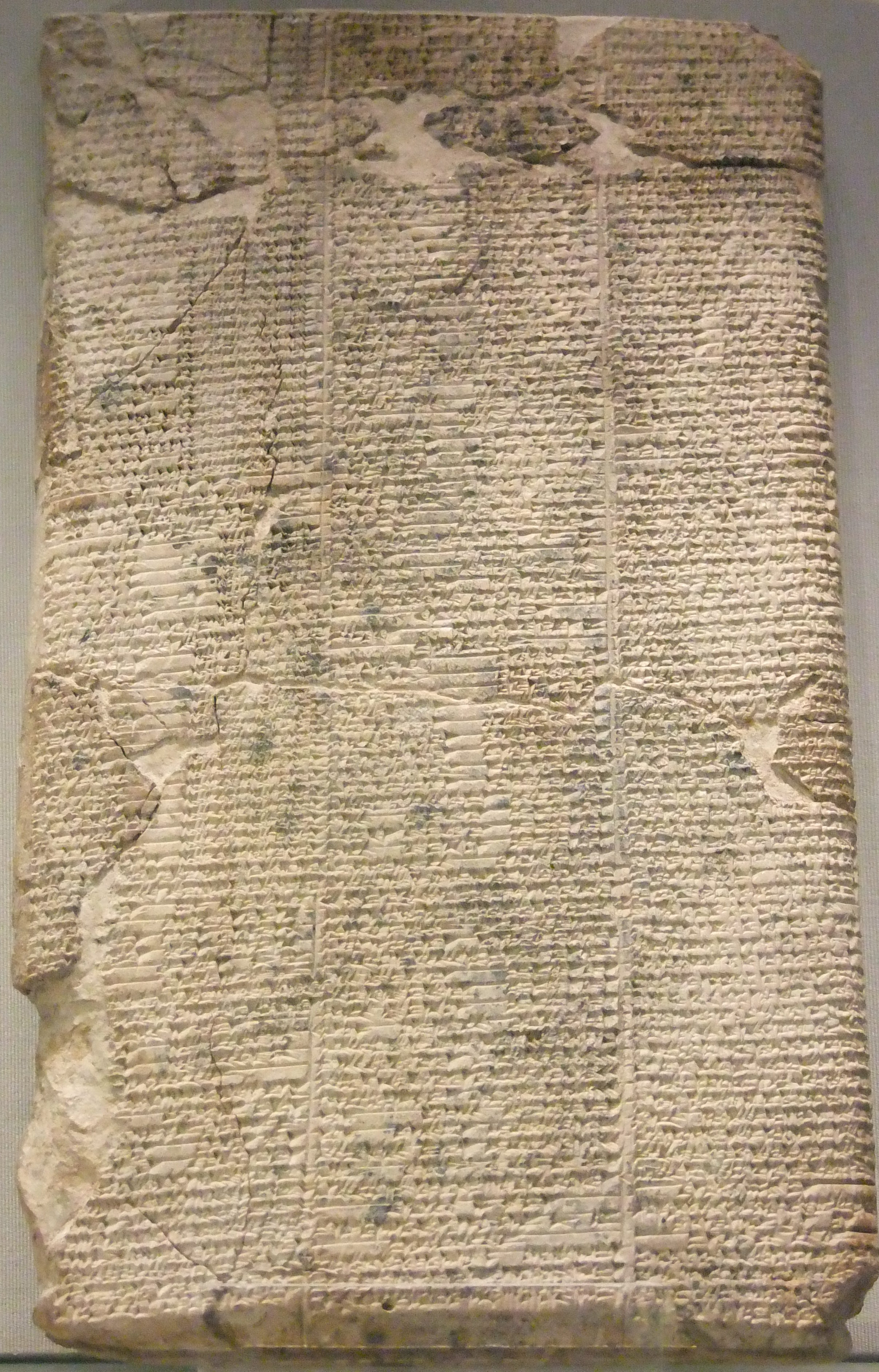
The Lament for Ur, commemorating the fall of Ur to the Elamites. Louvre Museum.

Kindattu (𒆠𒅔𒁕𒌅, ki-in-da-tu, also Kindadu; died c. 2001 BC) was the 6th king of the Shimashki Dynasty, in Elam (in present-day southwest Iran), at the time of the third dynasty of Ur in ancient Lower Mesopotamia.

He is mentioned in the Shilhak-Inshushinak list of kings who did work on the Inshushinak temple in Susa. Apparently, Kindattu invaded and conquered Ur c. 2004 BC, and captured Ibbi-Sin, the last of the third dynasty of Ur, and made him a prisoner. The Elamites sacked Ur and settled there, but then were defeated by Ishbi-Erra, the first king of the Isin dynasty in his year 16, and later expelled from Mesopotamia.

The destructions are related in the Lament for Ur:

"The good house of the lofty untouchable mountain, E-kiš-nu-g̃al, was entirely devoured by large axes. The people of Shimashki and Elam, the destroyers, counted its worth as only thirty shekels. They broke up the good house with pickaxes. They reduced the city to ruin mounds. Its queen cried, "Alas, my city", cried, "Alas, my house". Ningal cried, "Alas, my city," cried, "Alas, my house. As for me, the woman, both my city has been destroyed and my house has been destroyed. O Nanna, the shrine Urim has been destroyed and its people have been killed.""

— Lament for Ur (extract).

The Lament for Sumer and Ur then describes the fate of Ibbi-Sin:

An, Enlil, Enki and Ninhursag̃a have decided its fate -- to overturn the divine powers of Sumer, to lock up the favourable reign in its home, to destroy the city, to destroy the house, to destroy the cattle-pen, to level the sheepfold; (...) that Šimaški and Elam, the enemy, should dwell in their place; that its shepherd, in his own palace, should be captured by the enemy, that Ibbi-Sin should be taken to the land Elam in fetters, that from Mount Zabu on the edge of the sea to the borders of Anšan, like a swallow that has flown from its house, he should never return to his city"

— Lament for Sumer and Ur (extract).

An Hymn to Ishbi-Erra, although quite fragmentary, mentions the role played by Kindattu in the destruction of Ur.

== See also ==
- City Lament
