= Ibbi-Sin =

King of Sumer and Akkad, c. 2028–2004 BC

Ibbi-Sin 𒀭𒄿𒉈𒀭𒂗𒍪
- King of Sumer and Akkad; King of the Four Corners of the World
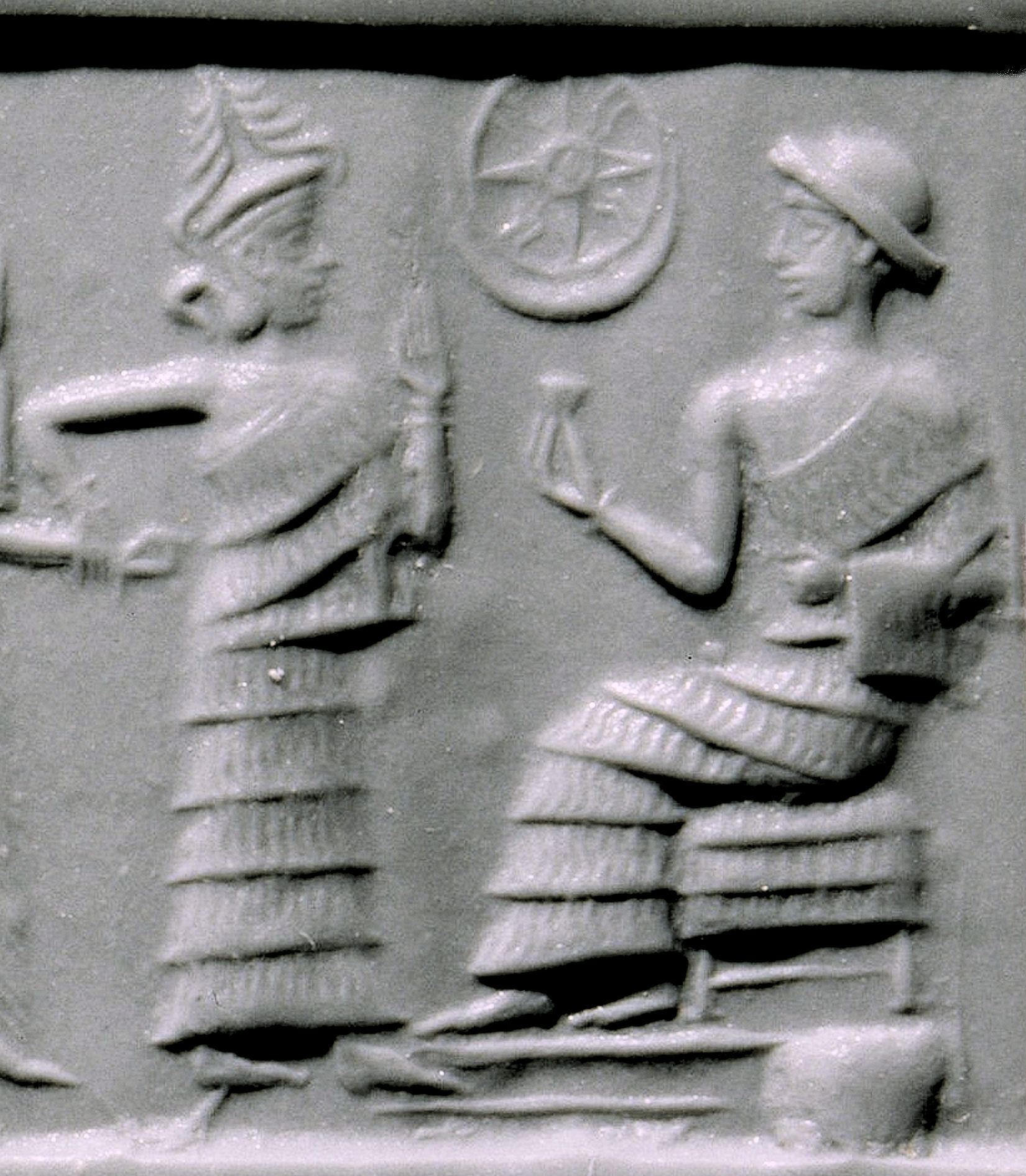
- Ibbi-Sin enthroned, with standing goddess

King of Ur
- Reign: c. 2028 – c. 2004 BC
- Predecessor: Shu-Sin
- Successor: Position abolished
- Died: c. 2004 BC
- Dynasty: Third Dynasty of Ur
- Father: Shu-Sin

Ibbi-Sin (Sumerian: 𒀭𒄿𒉈𒀭𒂗𒍪, ^{D}i-bi₂-^{D}suen; died c. 2004 BC) was king of Sumer and Akkad and last king of the Ur III dynasty, and reigned c. 2028–2004 BC (Middle chronology). During his reign, the Sumerian empire was attacked repeatedly by Amorites. As faith in Ibbi-Sin's leadership failed, Elam declared its independence and began to raid as well.

Ibbi-Sin ordered fortifications built at the important cities of Ur and Nippur, but these efforts were not enough to stop the raids or keep the empire unified. Cities throughout Ibbi-Sin's empire fell away from a king who could not protect them, notably Isin under the Amorite ruler Ishbi-Erra. Ibbi-Sin was, by the end of his kingship, left with only the city of Ur. In 2004 or 1940 BC, Elam, along with "tribesmen from the region of Shimashki in the Zagros Mountains" sacked Ur and took Ibbi-Sin captive; he was taken to the city of Elam where he was imprisoned and, at an unknown date, died.

== Amorite invasion ==
The Amorites were considered a backward people by Mesopotamian standards; Ibbi-Sin's 17th year was officially named "Year the Amorites, the powerful south wind who, from the remote past, have not known cities, submitted to Ibbi-Sin the king of Ur." However, despite his father Shu-Sin having built a "wall of Martu" across Mesopotamia against Amorite incursions, these were penetrated early in Ibbi-Sin's reign.

Scholars have suggested that, by the reign of Ibbi-Sin, the kingdom was already in decline due to long-term drought – in fact, the same drought that helped to take down Akkad c. 2193 BC may have been responsible for the fall of Ur III.

Studies of Persian Gulf sediments indicate that the stream flow of the Tigris and Euphrates was very low around 2100–2000 BC. [...] Any damage to the agricultural system by enemy raids, bureaucratic mismanagement, or an inattentive ruler would result in food shortages

In years seven and eight of Ibbi-Sin's kingship, the price of grain increased to 60 times the norm, which means that the success of the Amorites in disrupting the kingdom of Ur is, at least in part, a product of attacks on the agricultural and irrigation systems.

== Invasion by Elam ==
These attacks brought famine and caused an economic collapse in the kingdom, paving the way for Elam under Kindattu to strike into Ur and capture the king. The Lament for Sumer and Ur describe the fall of Ur and the fate of Ibbi-Sin:

An, Enlil, Enki and Ninhursaja have decided its fate -- to overturn the divine powers of Sumer, to lock up the favourable reign in its home, to destroy the city, to destroy the house, to destroy the cattle-pen, to level the sheepfold; (...) that Shimashki and Elam, the enemy, should dwell in their place; that its shepherd, in his own palace, should be captured by the enemy, that Ibbi-Sin should be taken to the land Elam in fetters, that from Mount Zabu on the edge of the sea to the borders of Ancan, like a swallow that has flown from its house, he should never return to his city"

— Lament for Sumer and Ur (extract).

== Year names ==
All the year names of Ibbi-Sin are known, documenting the major events of his reign. The main year names are:

1. Year: Ibbi-Suen is king
2. Year: (Ibbi-Suen) chose by means of the omens the en-priest of Inanna in Uruk
3. Year: Ibbi-Suen, the king of Ur, destroyed Simurrum
4. Year: Enamgalanna was installed as en-priest of Inanna
5. Year: The governor of Zabšali married Tukin-hatti-migrisha, the king's daughter
6. Year: Ibbi-Suen, the king of Ur, built for Nippur and Ur their great walls
9. Year: Ibbi-Suen, the king of Ur, went with massive power to Huhnuri, the bolt to the land of Anšan and like …
14. Year: "Ibbi-Suen, the king of Ur, overwhelmed Susa, Adamdun and Awan like a storm, subdued them in a single day and seized the lords of their people"
17. Year: "The Amorites, the powerful south wind who from the remote past have not known cities, submitted to Ibbi-Suen, the king of Ur"
23. Year: "The stupid monkey in the foreign land struck against Ibbi-Suen, the king of Ur"
24. Year: "Ibbi-Suen, the king of Ur, … struck"

— Main year names of the reign of Ibbi-Sin.

== Inscriptions ==
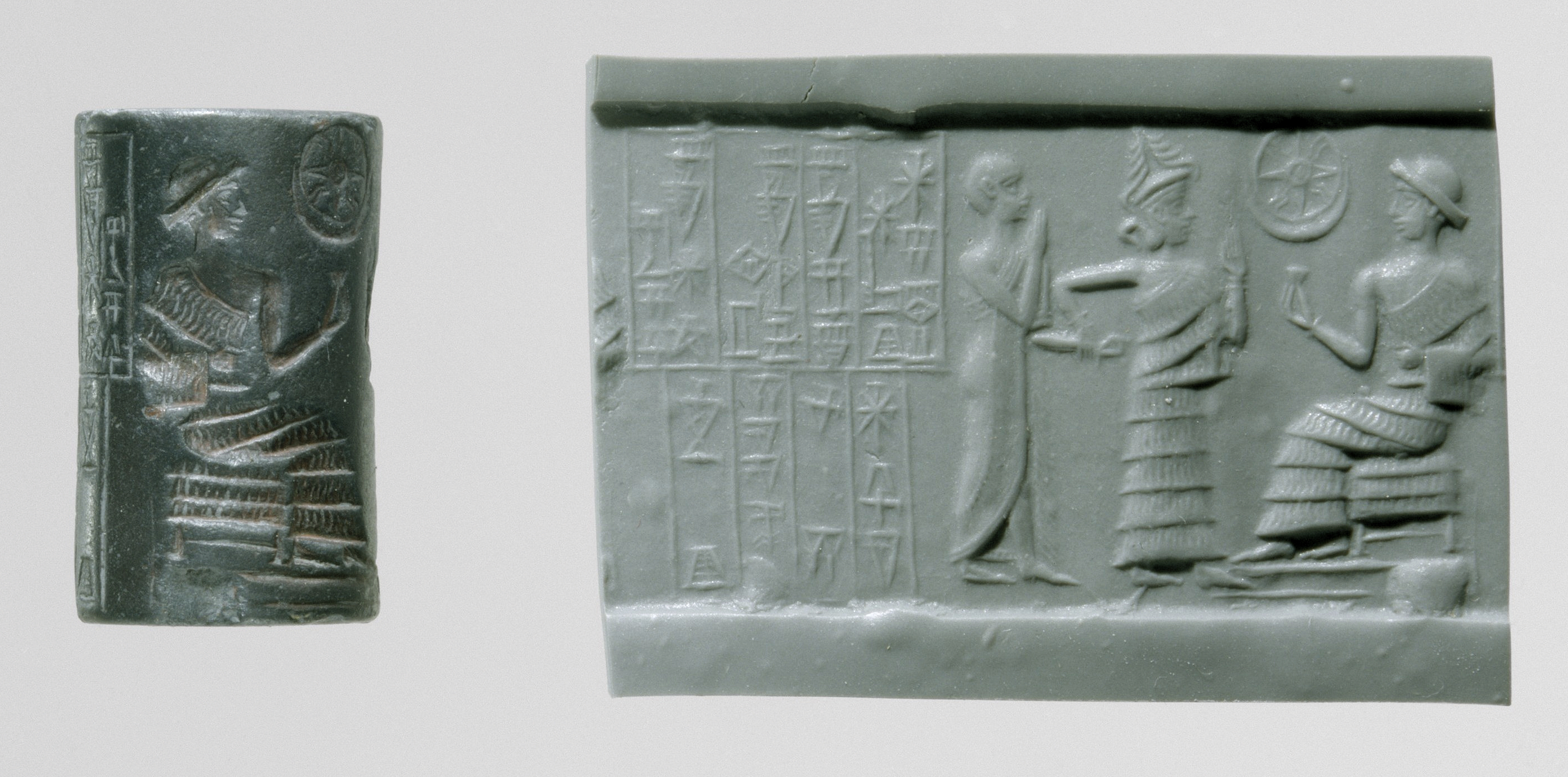
Ibbi-Sin cylinder seal, with Ibbi-Sin enthroned. Inscription: "Ibbi-Sin the strong king, king of Ur, King of the four quarters [of the world] // Ilum-bani the overseer, son of Ili-ukin [is] your servant".

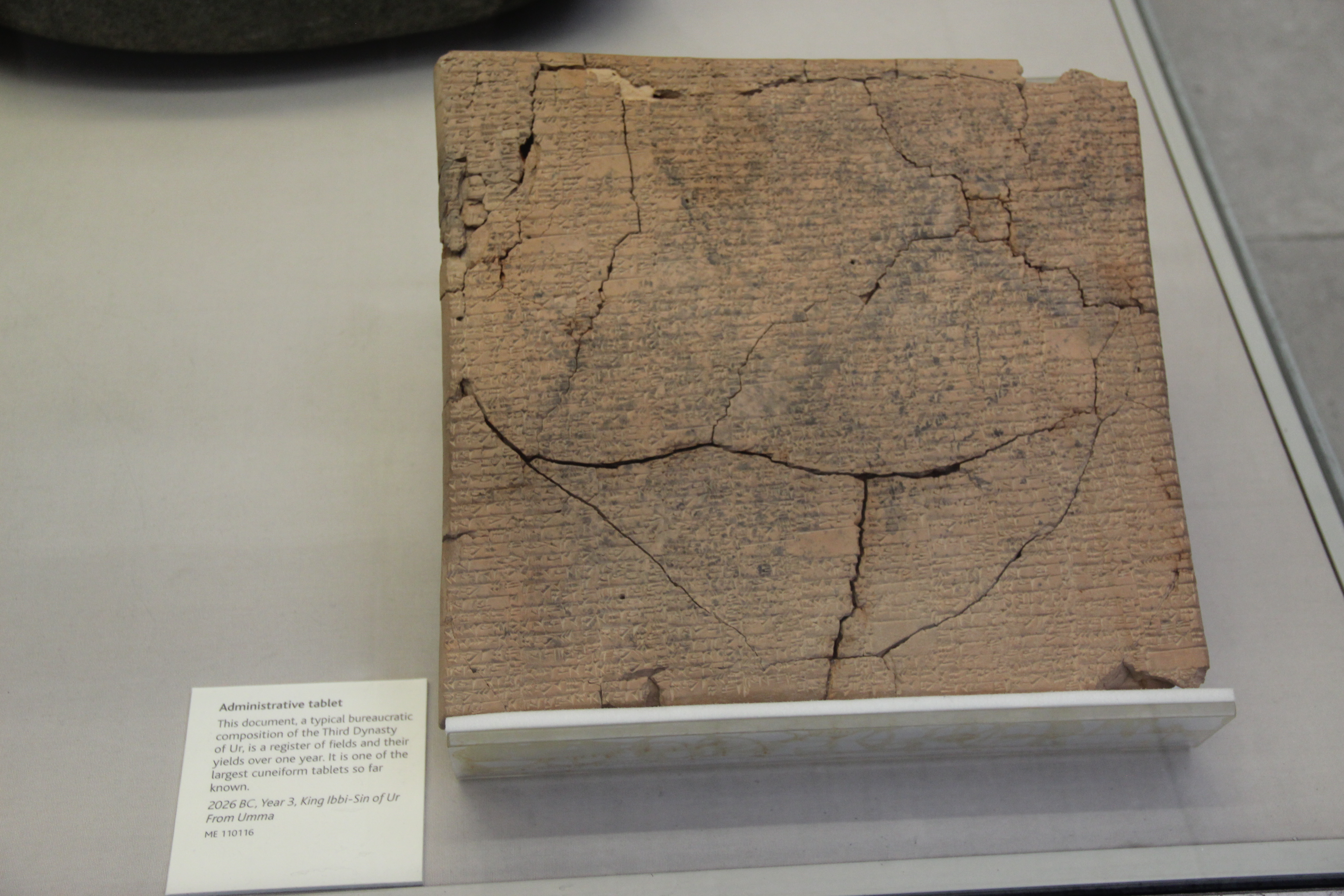
Administrative tablet of the reign of Ibbi-Sin, Third Dynasty of Ur, c. 2026 BC

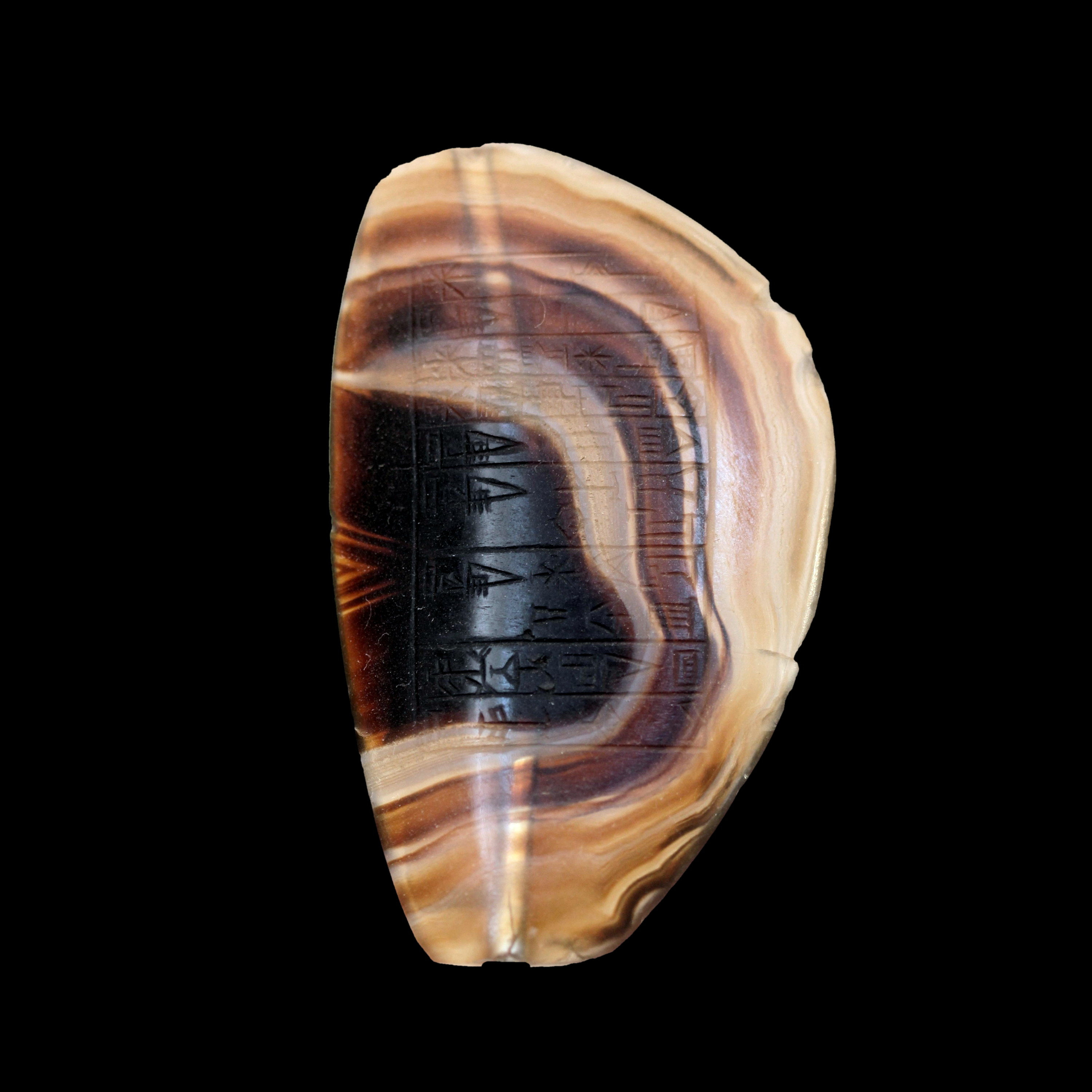
Votive bead dedicated to the Moon god by Ibbi-Sin, god-king of Ur, in recognition for saving his life: "To (the god) Nanna, his master, Ibbi-Sin, god of his country, strong king, king or Ur, king of the four regions, has, for his life, dedicated this bead."

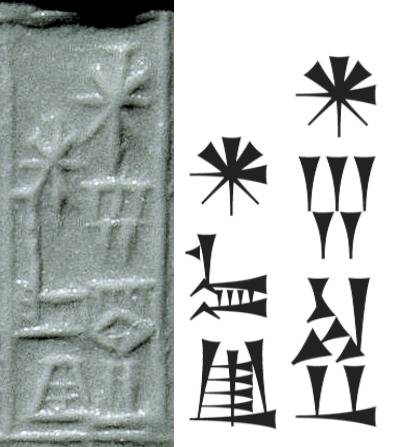
Name of Ibbi-Sin (𒀭𒄿𒉈𒀭𒂗𒍪) in inscription and standard cuneiform

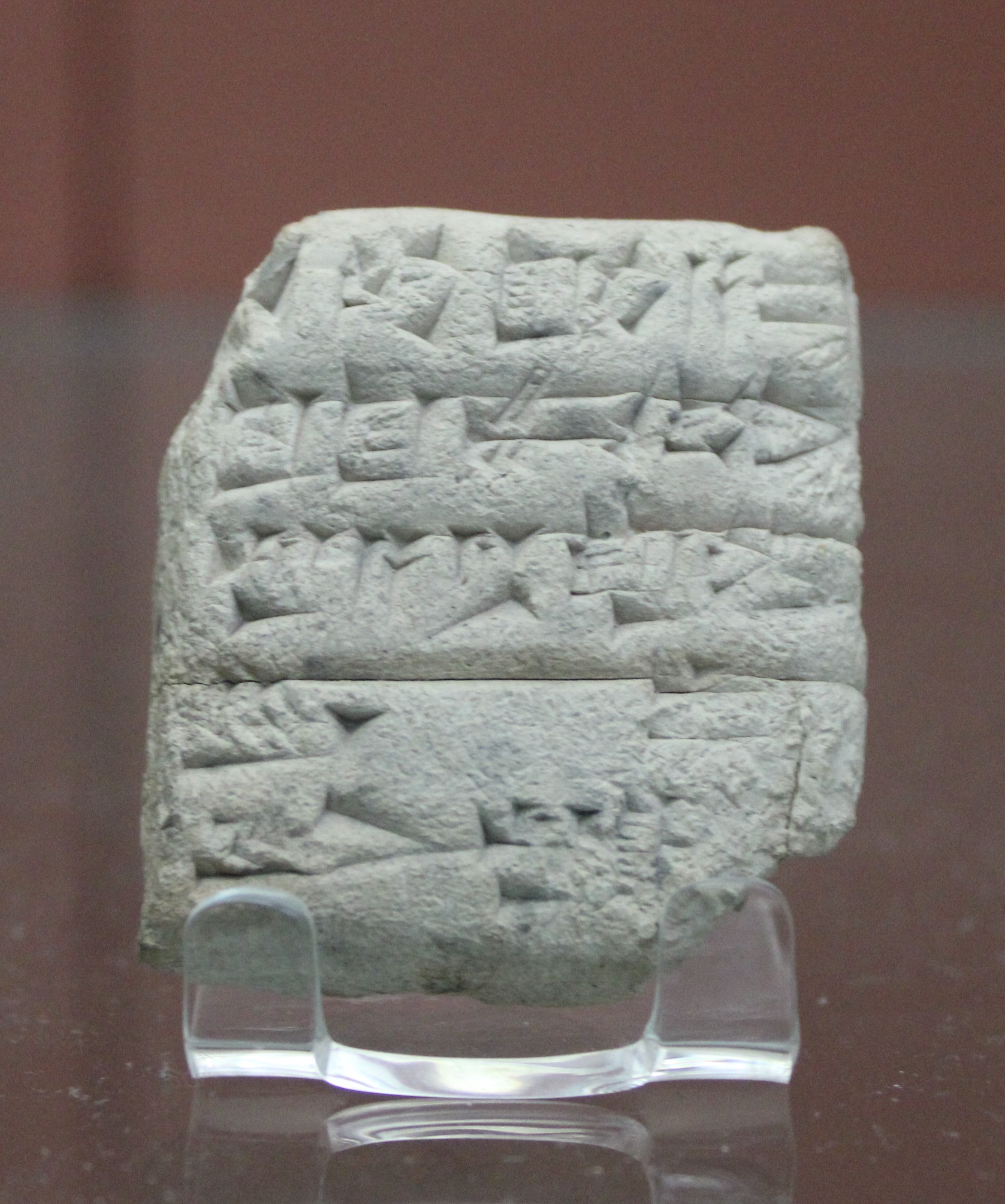
Receipt for garments sent by boat to Dilmun in the 1st year of Ibbi-Sin's rule. British Museum BM 130462.

Regnal titles
Preceded by Shu-Sin	King of Ur c. 2028 – c. 2004 BC	Succeeded by Position abolished
