= Sukkalmah dynasty =

Dynasty in ancient Elam

Sukkalmah dynasty Epartid dynasty
- Dynasty
- A map of the Near East detailing the geopolitical situation in the region during the Sukkalmah dynasty c. 1600 BC occupied by various contemporaneous civilizations such as those of the: Hattians Minoans Elamites Hyksos Egyptians Assyrians Babylonians Sumerians Eteocypriots Dilmunites Nubians A clickable map of Iran detailing cities that may have been occupied by the Elamites.
- Parent family: Shimashki dynasty
- Country: Elam
- Founded: c. 1980 BC
- Founder: Shilhaha (fl. c. 1980 – c. 1635 BC); (Eparti II, fl. c. 1980 – c. 1830 BC)
- Final ruler: Kutir-Nahhunte II (fl. c. 1710 – c. 1450 BC)
- Final head: Siwe-Palar-Khuppak (r. c. 1778 – c. 1745 BC)
- Historic seat: Susa
- Titles: List: Sukkalmah; Sukkal; Sukkal of Susa; Sukkal of Elam and Shimashki and Susa; Sukkal and Ippir of Susa; King of Anshan and Susa; King of Simashki; Enlarger of the Empire; Governor of Elam; Prince of Elam; Governor of Susa; Shepherd of the people of Susa; Shepherd of Inshushinak
- Connected families: Awan dynasty
- Dissolution: c. 1450 BC
- The Elamites remained a major source of tension for the Sumerians, Akkadians, Amorites, Assyrians, Babylonians, and Kassites centuries after the Old Elamite empire reached its peak during the reign of Siwe-Palar-Khuppak.

The Sukkalmah (c. 1900 – c. 1500 BC) or Epartid dynasty (named after the title sukkalmah used by many of the dynasty's rulers; as well as, the eponymous founder Ebarat II/Eparti II), was an early dynasty of West Asia in the ancient region of Elam, to the southeast of Babylonia. It corresponds to the third Paleo-Elamite period (dated to c. 1880 – c. 1450 BC). The Sukkalmah dynasty followed the Shimashki dynasty (c. 2200 – c. 1900 BC). The title of Sukkalmah means "Grand Regent" and was used by some (but not all) Elamite rulers. Numerous cuneiform documents and inscriptions remain from this period, particularly from the area of Susa, making the Sukkalmah period one of the best documented in Elamite history.

== Governmental Structure ==
The title of sukkal-mah, “great sukkal,” first appeared in Girsu within an inscription by Urukagina, roughly meaning “prime minister” or “grand vizier.” It continued to be in use in the Ur III period in Lagash. The Ur III sukkalmahs in Lagash reported directly to the king, and was the form adopted by the Elamite rulers. Siwe-palar-huppak also called himself “likawe rishakki” and “merrik Hatamtik” (governor of Elam), and the first phrase may be the Elamite rendering of the title of sukkalmah. It is likely that likawe by itself means sukkal, with risha being Elamite for “great”.

The creation of the Sukkalmah governmental structure is generally attributed to Ebarat II. However, an inscription from the reign of Idattu I referred to Kiten-rakittapi as the sukkalmah of Elam, likely implying that the sukkalmah of Elam was subordinate to the king of Anshan. De Graef suggests that this structure was implemented earlier, perhaps already in the reign of Ebarat I. Steinkeller further suggests that the later sukkalmahs in the Old Babylonian Period were also working under the king of Anshan and De Graef agrees that it was the case at least for the early period. Glassner connects this situation to the one between Ebarat II and Shilhaha, with Shilhaha as the sukkalmah under Ebarat. De Graef further adds Atta-husu, who was the sukkal in Susa during the reign of Idattu I and continued to hold the position under Ebarat.

Some rulers were attested with multiple titles outside of sukkalmah, and it is generally suggested that they ascended to become the sukkalmah later in life.

The political structure of the Sukkalmah dynasty is commonly argued to be a triumvirate, between the sukkal of Elam, the sukkal of Susa and the sukkalmah, the latter being the highest authority. However, recently De Graef suggests a more complicated structure, with at least two sukkalmahs and multiple sukkals and other governors ruling smaller regions which could also solve the seemingly chronological issue between the numerous different rulers of the early Sukkalmah period. Mofidi-Nasrabadi also considers the possibility that a single person could have occupied multiple positions. The title “ensi (governor) of Susa” was also used in the sukkalmah period. Potts also cautions against the assumption of a simple triumvirate, as it doesn't accommodate the numerous other positions attested during the Sukkalmah period.

There were two titles involving the position of sukkalmah and king, “Anshan and Susa” and the “Elam and Shimashki.” Mofidi-Nasrabadi argues that they were just two different variations of the same title and position, likely explaining the other variant used by some Sukkalmah period rulers, “Susa and Shimashki.” Unlike Mofidi-Nasrabadi however, De Graef believes that the titles “sukkalmah of Anshan and Susa” and “sukkalmah of Elam and Shimashki” referred to two separate positions, being the two main sukkalmahs. she also suggests that the sukkalmah of Anshan and Susa was a more prestigious position than the sukkalmah of Elam and Shimashki. De Graef's hypothesis is accepted by Wicks.

=== Son of the Sister of Shilhaha ===
Atta-husu is the first to refer to himself as the son of the sister (ruhu-sak) of Shilhaha, which likely points to his prominence in the establishment of the new governmental system. The fact that he is also the first ruler not mentioned in the Shimashkian King List (ShKL) to become king with other rulers being sidelined could also suggest a dynastic break. In total, at least eleven Sukkalmah period rulers have identified themselves as the son of the sister of another ruler, including Shilhaha. The Babylonian Chronicles had also detailed that the successor of Ummanigash (Huban-nikash I), Ishtarhundi (Shutruk-Nahhunte II), was the son of his sister.

This term has had many different interpretations, with Koschaker first proposing possibilities in 1933 such as incestuous marriage, marriage between different social classes, an indication of lineage through a particular female line, or legitimate descendant of a distant ancestor. Some scholars such as Hinz (Note: Hinz even believed that this practice was then reflected into the divine sphere.) and Vallat believe in royal incest within the Elamite ruling families. Potts points out that prior to the Achaemenid era there were no undisputed references to incest in Elam. While Waters had claimed that the deaths of successive Neo-Elamite kings point to incestuous conditions, Gorris reveals that some of them were murdered, while the two successive kings, Huban-menanu and Huban-haltash I that did both suffer from a stroke is not indicative of incest, and the relationship between them is still disputed. Another cited example comes from the Neo-Elamite local ruler Hanni of Ayapir, in which one line is sometimes translated to “Ḫuḫin, beloved sister-wife,” but has more recently been translated as “beloved lawful and true wife” instead by Quintana. Instead Potts suggests that the title “son of the sister” reflects an avuncular succession, drawing on cases across history and different cultures where an uncle to nephew succession is favoured. De Graef agrees that this reflects the existence of an avuncular line of succession alongside a patrilineal line of succession. She also refers to the incest theory as outdated.

The title “son of the sister of Shilhaha” appears in cases where plausible descent is impossible, such as the sukkalmah Shiruktuh, the late sukkalmah Temti-Halki and the later Middle-Elamite ruler Humban-numena. De Graef had opted to interpret “son of the sister of Shilhaha” as meaning the legitimate ruler through a fictitious descent. Potts also believes that in cases like Humban-numena, the title would serve as establishing descent, and also incorporating heroic qualities from the distant ancestor.

== History ==
The Sukkalmah dynasty is presumed to start with Ebarat II, as he was previously believed to have created the sukkalmah structure. As such, the Sukkalmah dynasty is also sometimes known as the Epartid dynasty.

The transition between the Shimashki period and the Sukkalmah period remains unclear. Vallat had suggested that the sukkalmahs from Susa took power from the Shimashkian kings and that the last kings of Shimashki were vassals of the early sukkalmahs before they lost power. Potts expands on this theory, suggesting that the offense by Gugunum of Larsa in which he claimed to have destroyed Bashime in his third year and Anshan in his fifth may have contributed to the demise of Shimashki. The fact that Atta-husu never bore the title of sukkalmah could possibly be an indication that he ascended his position through less legitimate means, perhaps following Gugunum's invasion. Potts further suggests that Gugunum actually held power in Susa for a brief period, and Atta-husu was his vassal. De Graef argues that the tablet from Susa using the year name of Gugunum cannot be taken as indication of Larsa's extended rule over Susa, as it is the only tablet that references so. She also argues that since Atta-husu was a contemporary of Ebarat II and Shilhaha, he cannot be a contemporary of Gugunum, believing the reference to the 16th year name of Gugunum in Susa dates to 1822 BCE and thus to have reigned after the early sukkalmahs. However, the reign of Gugunum is generally dated to around 1932-1906 BCE following the middle chronology, bringing him closer to the early sukkalmahs. While Atta-husu never used the title sukkalmah, he was attested as sukkal of Susa and teppir (high ranking judicial official) alongside more traditional titles such of Shepherd, which De Graef argues is indicative of Atta-husu being a transitional figure. However, De Graef does believe some kind of interdynastic struggle is possible, seeing how Ebarat II succeeded Idattu I as king instead of Tan-Ruhurater, the governor of Susa and (possibly eldest) son of Idattu, who was probably the next in line. Atta-husu referring to himself as “son of the sister of Shilhaha” despite being a son of Kindattu (possibly the one known as the son of Tan-Ruhurater) could also be indicative of this interdynastic shift.

De Graef believes that the Shimashki period should not be considered to be separate, and has advocated for removing the Shimashki period and grouping it with the Sukkalmah period.

Vallat's theory that Atta-husu was contemporary with Sumu-abum of Babylon based on a supposed ascension year name of Sumu-abum can be rejected, most notably because Sumu-abum never actually held power in Babylon and thus would not have had year names.

Around the time of Ebarat II's reign, Temti-Agun, Shilhaha and Pala-iššan were all attested as a sukkalmah. Temti-Agun was named in an inscription on a gunagi vessel along with Ebarat II, which Glassner believes to be for the occasion when Ebarat died. Pala-iššan was the brother of Temti-Agun. The reign of Pala-iššan is still very uncertain, and Glassner believes that Temti-Agun was likely the immediate successor of Shilhaha. Following her reconstruction separating the sukkalmah of Elam and Shimashki and the sukkalmah of Anshan and Susa as separate positions, De Graef instead argues that Pala-iššan was the older brother and thus more immediate successor. Temti-Agun likely succeeded Atta-husu as the sukkal and teppir of Susa. Kuk-sanit, who De Graef claims to be a brother of Temti-Agum but is actually attested as a son of Temti-Agum instead later became the teppir (and likely also sukkal) of Susa. Pala-iššan is attested with a Kuk-kirwash, another “son of the sister of Shilhaha.” Kuk-kirwash is in turn mentioned together with Tem-sanit and Kuk-Nahhunte. A Kuk-nashur is attested together with Kuk-Nahhunte, although the name Kuk-nashur is difficult to situate due to the numerous attestations of the name. For example, Mofidi-Nasrabadi had suggested that three different Kuk-nashurs were present in the reign of Temti-Agun II.

Despite the involvement of Elam in international affairs, most of the Elamite rulers remain unnamed in Mesopotamian sources. Earlier on Tan-ruhurater married a daughter of Bilalama of Eshnunna, and Elam was seemingly at war with Der. Later, Sin-iddinam of Larsa claims to have destroyed Anshan and Eshnunna in his 6th year. In Sin-iddinam's letter to Utu, he mentions conflicts with Elam, Shimashki and Subartu. A few years later, Elam established an alliance with Zambija of Isin, and later Sin-iqisham of Larsa claims in his 5th year name (around 1837 BCE) to have defeated Uruk, Kazallu, and the armies of Elam and Zambija. Around this time Ipiq-Adad II of Eshnunna was defeated by Elam, the same year Shamshi-Adad I ascended to the throne of his father. While Shiruktuh had been suggested to be the ruler of Elam during this period, the letter that mentions him dates to 1785 BCE, which would require Shiruktuh to have reigned for over 50 years.

Meanwhile, around 1834 BCE, a new dynasty was installed in Larsa. Its founder, Kudur-mabuk, had a linguistically Elamite name, along with his father Shimti-Shilhak and daughter Manzi-wartash. However, none of Kudur-mabuk's titles are Elamite, and he calls himself the father (“sheikh”) of the Yamutbal. Steinkeller argues that instead of only having previously entered Elamite service as had been argued, the family of Kudur-mabuk actually had strong Elamite cultural ties. Personnel bearing Elamite names were among the entourage of Kudur-mabuk and his son Rim-Sin, and one letter roughly from the reign of Sin-iddinam explicitly identifying a Kudur-mabuk (and his singers) as Elamites likely refers to him. Some scholars like Steinkeller, De Graef and Wicks consider Kudur-mabuk to be Elamite, with De Graef further suspecting his father Shimti-Shilhak to be connected to the Elamite rulers. Charpin classifies them as “Elamitized Amorites” while Wasserman and Bloch suggest he was an Elamite who settled among the Yamutbal. Steinkeller points out that Elamites and Amorites had many interactions in the zone bordering Elam and southern Mesopotamia, and Wicks adds that Larsa had many attested Elamite names, second only to Susa.

The circumstances surrounding Kudur-mabuk taking the throne of Larsa, and whether he was acting on his own or as some kind of Elamite proxy, is unclear. Steinkeller believes that it is likely connected to the conflicts experienced towards the end of Sin-iddinam's reign, likely described in Sin-iddinam's letter to Utu. De Graef suggests that the activities of Kudur-mabuk and the almost simultaneous attack on Eshnunna by Elam were coordinated, and that Kudur-mabuk probably still had close contacts with Elam.

Later, in Shamshi-Adad's 28th year (around 1785 BCE), Shiruktuh was mentioned in a letter, describing how the “king of Elam” contributed 12,000 troops in a joint expedition with Eshnunna, Shamshi-Adad, and perhaps the Turukkeans against the Gutians. A fragmentary Elamite inscription listing conquests can likely be attributed to Shiruktuh, especially if the restoration of one of the names as Indassu (Indasu, king of the Gutians) is followed. Another letter from Shemshara mentions the “father and great overseer” which may be a variation on the sukkalmah title. Shiruktuh and his nephews Siwe-palar-huppak and Temti-Agun II all mention an “amma-hashtuk” which may refer to the queen mother by the name of W/Pelkisha, perhaps a sister of Shiruktuh.

From the letters in this period, especially those from Mari in the reign of Zimri-Lim, it is clear that the rulers of Elam enjoyed a prestigious position in international affairs. The negotiations between Zimri-Lim and Hammurabi of Babylon regarding the ownership of multiple cities near their border had the sukkalmah of Elam as the mediator. It would seem Hit (one of the most contentious cities) was assigned to Zimri-Lim by the sukkalmah. The authority of the sukkalmah of Elam was recognized by Qatna in Syria. While the Amorite rulers on the same calibre as Hammurabi and Zimri-Lim addressed each other as brothers (denoting equal rank), the sukkalmah of Elam would be referred to as their father (denoting superior rank). In one letter sent by Ishme-Addu of Ashnakkum to Ibal-Addu of Ashlakka, Ishme-Addu claims to hold the hands of the Elamites and the king of Eshnunna at the back of his neck. Sasson points out that Ishme-Addu is prone to hubris.

However, texts from Mari seem to be confused on the positions and government in the Elamite state. They mix the titles of sukkal with king, with Siwe-palar-huppak sometimes being referred to as the “king of Anshan” and Kudu-zulush (the sukkal of Susa) as the “king of Susa.” It would appear that the sukkalmah is commonly referred to as the “sukkal of Elam.” There is other evidence pointing to a general unfamiliarity with Elam in Mari, such as writing Kudu-zulush in reverse as Shulshi-kudur and mistaking a position as a proper name. Despite the clear direct involvement of Elam in international diplomacy during this time, many letters addressed from the sukkalmah only mention him by title, remaining anonymous.

Between Zimri-Lim's 8th and 10th (7th and 9th) years, (Note: Using the new chronology on Zimri-Lim’s reign established by Charpin & Ziegler in 2003. The old chronology by Birot is in brackets.) contacts with Elam increased, and Mari received tin from Elam on multiple occasions. Eventually the sukkalmah (Siwe-palar-huppak) requested for both Zimri-Lim and Hammurabi of Babylon's military assistance against Eshnunna, and both obliged. Eshnunna would have been captured sometime between Zimri-Lim's 8th to 10th (7th and 9th) year. Although the fall of Eshnunna was originally taken advantage of by some of the rulers, such as Hammurabi who retook Maniksum and Upi, cities originally lost to Eshnunna, soon the Elamites began an offensive into Mesopotamia. In fact, Hammurabi was reprimanded by Siwe-palar-huppak for taking advantage of the situation and threatened to attack Babylon if he doesn't return the cities. Elam eventually besieged Maniksum and then Upi.

It had been suggested that one major reason for the invasion was to control the tin trade, and the route from Eshnunna to Shubat-Enlil is linked to trade routes so moving from Eshnunna to Shubat-Enlil is likely not a coincidence. Heimpel had suggested that Elam played a major part in the supply of tin into Mesopotamia and Peyronel believes Eshnunna's control of the tin route is related to their relationship with Shamshi-Adad's kingdom and Elam. It is also noteworthy that the Elamites kicked the Assyrian merchants out of Shubat-Enlil when they took the city, as Assyrian merchants included tin in their trades. Sasson suggests that the invasion of Eshnunna may be “a rematch from earlier battles.” An Elamite general by the name of Kunnam was installed in Shubat-Enlil.

The Elamite invasion elicited a strong reaction from the Mesopotamian Amorite leaders. Hammurabi called for a mobilization of troops requiring every man to participate, including merchants and also freeing slaves. He also sent envoys to Larsa to ask for support, and while initially seeming optimistic, ended up not receive troops from Larsa, with Rim-Sin claiming that they would be ready in case of an attack and that the Elamites have plans to move elsewhere. Charpin connects this ambivalence to the Elamite roots of Rim-Sin's family, while Heimpel wonders if Larsa and Babylon had a rivalry, or that perhaps Elam was occupying parts of Larsa's territory, connecting it to a reference of a time when “the claw of Elam was torn from the land of Larsa by the great gods” as written in a letter. Siwe-palar-huppak also encouraged a rebellion by the Mutiabal in Babylonian territory. At some point, Siwe-palar-huppak also sent an ultimatum to both Babylon and Larsa, telling each to join him to attack the other. Eventually the Elamites began to lay siege to Hiritum.

At the same time, Zimri-Lim was away with troops to help Yarim-Lim of Aleppo. The news about the Elamite invasion was received by him in Ugarit.

Atamrum, former king of Allahad who for unknown reasons took refuge in Eshnunna and led their troops, allied with Elam and led an army of Elamites and Eshnunneans to attack Razama (after Elam told Atamrum to abandon taking Ekallatum.) As for Zimri-Lim's allies/vassals of the region, Qarni-Lim of Andarig was killed and Sharraya of Razama was being attacked. Haya-Sumu of Ilan-Ṣura submitted to the Elamites, with a sarcastic remark that Zimri-Lim would save him just like he saved Shub-Ram and Sammetar. Ibal-Addu of Ashlakka also listed multiple kings that “grasped the hem of your lord (Zimri-Lim)” but were killed in this chaos, including Sammetar who was apparently killed, wrapped in leather and delivered to the Elamites by his own people. Ibal-Addu ends each king asking why Zimri-Lim did not save them. Sammetar was replaced by Ishme-Addu, who submitted to Kunnam (the Elamite general) along with Haya-Sumu and Addi-Addu. Ishme-Addu reprimanded Ibal-Addu for continuing to support Mari, claiming that Zimri-Lim and the entire land gave tribute to the sukkalmah, so there is nothing to resist anymore.

Other Mari texts portray this event as a difficult time for Mari. There was a surge in prophecies and divine messages likely to legitimize actions and gain support, and oaths were sworn by the entire population of Mari. One letter called on Ea to let the gods drink water mixed with doorpost dirt from Mari to take an oath to not harm the city. In the same letter, a message from a priest of Dērītum was relayed that the area belongs to Zimri-Lim and the “lance of the Elamites” would break. The tribute paid by Tuttul to Mari was bewitched and their people openly took the side of Elam. Durand thinks the stressful reaction of Mari to fighting Elam is reminiscent of a vassal rebelling against a suzerain. He also suggests that the Yaminites were allied with Elam via Eshnunna, perhaps explaining Tuttul's conduct and why Zimri-Lim had trouble conscripting the Yaminites. Wasserman and Bloch point out it seems Zimri-Lim also had trouble conscripting Yaminites and some of the Simalites too.

Eventually Zimri-Lim and Hammurabi signed an alliance that none of them would make peace with Siwe-palar-huppak without consulting the other first. Yarim-Lim would also side with Mari and Babylon against Elam, although Yarim-Lim also died that same year. Yarim-Lim also sent a letter to the king of Der that included a direct threat of war, which Wasserman and Bloch suggests may be indication that Der sided with Elam. Durand believes that trans-Tigridian Der may have been another extension of Elamite power, and the threat by Yarim-Lim is likely situated in that context.

Swear by Šamaš of heaven! Swear by Addu of heaven! These are the gods that Hammurabi, son of Sin-muballiṭ, king of Babylon, invoked (when taking this oath), “From now on, as long as I live, I shall indeed be enemy of Ṣiwa-palar-ḫuḫpak. I shall not let my servants or my messengers mingle with his servants, and I shall not dispatch them to him. I shall not make peace with Ṣiwa-palar-ḫuḫpak without the approval of Zimri-Lim, king of Mari and the Tribal-land. If I plan to make peace with Ṣiwa-palar-ḫuḫpak, I shall certainly consult with Zimri-Lim, son of Yaḫdun-Lim, king of Mari and the Tribal-land. If it is not a peaceful situation, we shall make peace with Ṣiwa-palar-ḫuḫpak (only) jointly. The oath sworn by my gods, Šamaš and Addu, to Zimri-Lim, son of Yaḫdun-Lim, king of Mari and the Tribal Land, I have bound and committed myself to him, joyfully and with complete sincerity.

Later, Siwe-palar-huppak offered to send a bow to Hadad of Aleppo if asked, although he previously refused to. Considering the offer contains an allusion to a reestablishment of relationships, Charpin suggests that Siwe-palar-huppak is likely taking advantage of the death of Yarim-Lim to pull Aleppo from the anti-Elamite alliance. However, the new king of Aleppo, Hammurabi (not to be confused with Hammurabi of Babylon), would choose to continue siding against Elam.

The alliance between the Amorite leaders for the Elamite invasion had been attributed by Charpin and Durand to Amorite nationalism. Sasson however, expresses some doubts. Miglio had suggested another translation for the letter commonly cited for an Amorite nationalism, arguing that instead of a difference between Elamites and Amorites, it was a rhetorical question asking whether the Elamites would care about tribal differences instead of sweeping everyone away like the flood. Wasserman and Bloch however believe that the popular translation as a clear difference between the Amorites and the Elamites is correct.

The situation in the Habur region was still chaotic, with one letter describing that the Elamite army had swallowed all Šubartum. Hammurabi of Kurda (not to be confused with Hammurabi of Babylon) was reprimanded by the sukkal for suspected collusions with Mari or Babylon, being reminded that he was a vassal of Atamrum, who was in turn a vassal of Elam. Ishme-Dagan was denounced by the kings for allying with Mari and Babylon and taken to the sukkalmah at Eshnunna. Charpin believes that Ishme-Dagan was tortured and was then released after being bought out at Babylon, and then stayed at Babylon to recover his health, which was publicly criticized by a priest of Marduk. Heimpel's interpretation on the chronology of events differed, with Ishme-Dagan being sick at Babylon, then took materials from the treasury of Marduk and personally presented them to the sukkalmah, which was publicly criticized by a priest of Marduk. Eventually it seems like Haya-Sumu reverted to Mari, transmitting one of the most infamous descriptions on the conduct of Elam, that it “devours its enemies as well as its allies”, (Note: Translation from Sasson.) perhaps explaining why Haya-Sumu defected back to Zimri-Lim. Zimri-Lim would also send troops over to Babylon as reinforcement, with inquiries using divination for how trustworthy Hammurabi is.

At some point in the war, a drunk Kunnam accidentally leaked that Siwe-palar-huppak had informants in Zimri-Lim's court. Eventually, the Elamites abandoned their siege on Hiritum, with Atamrum also defected over to Zimri-Lim probably around this time. Heading upstream of the Tigris attacking Maniksum and Šittulum, but were then faced with the coalition assembled by Zimri-Lim. They retreated back to Eshnunna, looted the place, then retreated back to Susa. Although the invasion only lasted for a short time (Zimri-Lim's 10th to 11th years), it left a big impact on the region. Very quickly, Hammurabi of Babylon sought to reestablish relationships with Elam. Heimpel had previously wondered if tin was a reason behind why Hammurabi seemed eager to do so, and De Graef adds tin as a factor along with concerns with the reemerging Eshnunna under Silli-Sin. At one point Hammurabi received an incorrect report that the sukkal of Elam (possibly Siwe-palar-huppak) died, which he rejoiced to. However, it was quickly corrected that the sukkal was not dead but gravely ill.

Kudu-zulush is mentioned with Kutir-Nahhunte, a son of the sister of Siwe-palar-huppak, in an oath. Kutir-Nahhunte is mentioned with Temti-Agun II, and Temti-Agun II appears alongside Kuk-nashur II. Lila-irtash, Atta-mera-halki and Tata were mentioned with him, of which only Tata was given a title (sukkal). The reigns of the three were likely short and never ascended to sukkalmah. Kuk-nashur II was argued to be contemporary to Ammi-Saduqa based on a tablet discovered in Dilbat, but the tablet itself is a copy of an original tablet likely predating Ammi-saduqa, and could have been a scribal practice considering the doodles on the tablet. Kuk-nashur II is likely instead the “Kukanashur” that sent messages to Ilūni, a king of Eshnunna and contemporary of Samsu-iluna.

Kuk-nashur II is mentioned together with a ruler (“king”) of Susa, Kudu-zulush II. Kudu-zulush II however, was never attested with the title of sukkal, so De Graef wonders if Kuzu-zulush II was actually a king, maybe an abbreviation of the later title “king of Susa and Anshan.” Abi-Eshuh, the grandson of Hammurabi, has a year name that appears to record another military conflict with Elam. While this military conflict does not have many contemporary references, it may be the one referenced by Ashurbanipal referring to a statue of Nanaya that was taken to Elam 1635 years ago. Some scholars identify the Kutir-Nahhunte mentioned by Ashurbanipal as the Shutrukid Kutir-Nahhunte with the 1635 years being an exaggeration on Ashurbanipal's part, but van Koppen believes Ashurbanipal was most likely referring to the sukkalmah by the same name. Naturally, van Koppen also disagrees with the other proposal to date Kudur-Nahhunte's attack to Samsu-iluna's reign. De Graef agrees with van Koppen's proposal. A Kutir-Shilhaha who was a sukkal and then a sukkalmah is mentioned together with Kutir-Nahhunte and Kuk-nashur II. Another “king of Susa” is mentioned together with Kutir-Shilhaha, Tempti-raptash. Shirtuh, a son of Kuk-nashur II(/III?) is also known as “king of Susa.” Tan-uli, a sukkal and later a sukkalmah, is mentioned together with Temti-halki, also attested with sukkal and sukkalmah titles, and also a Kuk-nashur (III or IV?), a son of the sister of Tan-uli according to the later Genealogy of Shilhak-Inshushinak.

== List of rulers ==
The following list should not be considered complete:

#	Depiction	Name	Succession	Title	Approx. dates	Notes
Isin-Larsa period (c. 2025 – c. 1894 BC)
Shimashki dynasty (c. 2220 – c. 1792 BC)
7th		Idattu I 𒀭𒄿𒁕𒁺	Son of Kindattu (Note: Idattu-Inshushinak son of Pepi is likely someone else, different from both Idattus. It is unclear how to situate Idattu-Inshushinak, although one of his titles suggest an earlier date.)	King of Shimashki	reigned c. 1945 – c. 1925 BC	temp. of: Iddin-Dagan; Bilalama; Gungunum
8th		Tan-Ruhuratir	Son of Indattu I	governor (ensi) of Susa	Uncertain, fl. c. 2028 – c. 1950 BC	temp. of: Shu-Ilishu; Iddin-Dagan; Bilalama
9th		Ebarat II 𒂊𒁀𒊏𒀜 E-b-r-t	Eponymous founder of the Epartid dynasty	Sukkalmah King of Anshan and Susa King of Shimashki	Uncertain, m. c. 1973 BC to Matum-Niatum	temp. of: Shu-Ilishu; Iddin-Dagan; Shilhaha; Atta-husu; Temti-Agun I; Pala-iššan
10th		Idattu II	son of Tan-ruhurater	governor (ensi) of Susa		
11th		Idattunapir	Unclear succession	King of Shimashki	Uncertain, fl. c. 1928 – c. 1880 BC	temp. of: Sumuabum
12th		Idattutemti	Unclear succession	King of Shimashki	Uncertain, fl. c. 1928 – c. 1792 BC	
"Twelve kings of Shimashki." — Shimashki King List
Epartid/Sukkalmah dynasty (c. 1980 – c. 1830 BC)
2nd		Shilhaha 𒂊𒁀𒊏𒀜 Shi-l-ha-ha	Son of Ebarat II	Sukkalmah King of Anshan and Susa	Uncertain, fl. c. 1980 – c. 1635 BC	temp. of: Ebarat II; Atta-husu; Temti-Agun I; Pala-iššan; Kuk-sanit; Kuk-kirwash
		Attakhushu	Son of the sister of Shilhaha Son of Kindattu (II?)	Sukkal and Ippir of Susa Shepherd of the people of Susa Shepherd of Inshushinak	Uncertain, fl. c. 1980 – c. 1635 BC	temp. of: Ebarat II; Shilhaha; Gungunum
		Kuk-Nashur I	son of Shilhaha	Sukkalmah	Uncertain, fl. c. 1980 – c. 1635 BC	
		Palar-Ishshan	brother of Temti-Agun I Son of the sister of Shilhaha	Sukkalmah	Uncertain, fl. c. 1980 – c. 1635 BC	
		Temti-Agun I	son of the sister of Shilhaha	sukkalmah	Uncertain, fl. c. 1980 – c. 1635 BC	
		Kuk-Sanit	son of Temti-Agun I		Uncertain, fl. c. 1980 – c. 1635 BC	
		Lankuku	Father of Kuk-Kirwash		Uncertain, fl. c. 1980 – c. 1635 BC	
		Kuk-Kirwash	son of the sister of Shilhaha son of Lankuku	Sukkalmah Sukkal of Elam and Shimashki and Susa	Uncertain, fl. c. 1980 – c. 1635 BC	temp. of: Kuk-Nahhunte; Tep-mada
		Tem-Sanit			Uncertain, fl. c. 1980 – c. 1635 BC	
		Kuk-Nahhunte			Uncertain, fl. c. 1980 – c. 1635 BC	
		Tetep-Mada		Shepherd of the people of Susa	Uncertain, fl. c. 1894 – c. 1790 BC	temp. of: Sumuabum
		Shirukduh	Descendant of Shilhaha?	Sukkalmah	Uncertain, fl. c. 1792 – c. 1763 BC	temp. of: Shamshi-Adad I?
		Shimut-Wartash I			Uncertain, fl. c. 1790 – c. 1763 BC	temp. of: Shamshi-Adad I?
		Siwe-Palar-Khuppak	Son of the sister of Shirukduh Descendant of Shilhaha(?)	Sukkalmah Sukkal of Susa Prince/ruler/governor (menik) of Elam	Uncertain, reigned c. 1778 – c. 1745 BC	temp. of: Hammurabi; Zimri-Lim; Shamshi-Adad I?; Rim-Sin; Kudu-zulush I
		Kuduzulush I	Son of the sister of Shirukduh	Sukkal of Susa	Uncertain, fl. c. 1765 – c. 1730 BC	temp. of: Siwe-Palar-Khuppak; Hammurabi; Zimri-Lim; Rim-Sin
		Kutir-Nahhunte I	Son of the sister of Siwe-palar-huppak Son of Kudu-zulush I?	Sukkalmah?	Uncertain, fl. c. 1730 – c. 1700 BC	temp. of: Abi-eshuh?
		Lila-Irtash			Uncertain, fl. c. 1710 – c. 1698 BC	
		Temti-Agun II	Descendant of Shilhaha(?)	Sukkalmah Sukkal of Susa	r. c. 1698 – c. 1690 BC	
		Atta-Merra-Halki			Uncertain, fl. c. 1710 – c. 1570 BC	
		Tata		Sukkal	Uncertain, fl. c. 1710 – c. 1580 BC	
		Kuk-Nashur II (/III?)	Son of the sister of Temti-Agun Son of Naririda	Sukkalmah?	Uncertain, fl. c. 1790 – c. 1625 BC	temp. of: Samsu-iluna
		Temti-Raptash		King of Susa	Uncertain, fl. c. 1625 – c. 1605 BC	
		Shirtuh		King of Susa	Uncertain, fl. c. 1605 – c. 1600 BC	
		Shimut-Wartash II			Uncertain, fl. c. 1605 – c. 1595 BC	
		Kuduzulush II		King of Susa	Uncertain, fl. c. 1605 – c. 1590 BC	temp. of: Kutir-Shlhaha
		Temti-Halki		Sukkalmah Sukkal of Elam and Simashki and Susa	Uncertain, fl. c. 1710 – c. 1650 BC	
		Tan-Uli	Descendant of Shilhaha (?)	Sukkalmah Sukkal	Uncertain, fl. c. 1690 – c. 1600 BC	
		Kutir-Shilhaha I		Sukkalmah Sukkal	Uncertain, fl. c. 1650 – c. 1625 BC	temp. of: Tempti-raptash; Shirtuh
		Kuk-Nashur IV	Son of the sister of Tan-Uli	Sukkalmah	Uncertain, fl. c. 1710 – c. 1698 BC	
		Kutir-Nahhunte II			Uncertain, fl. c. 1710 – c. 1450 BC	

== Gallery ==
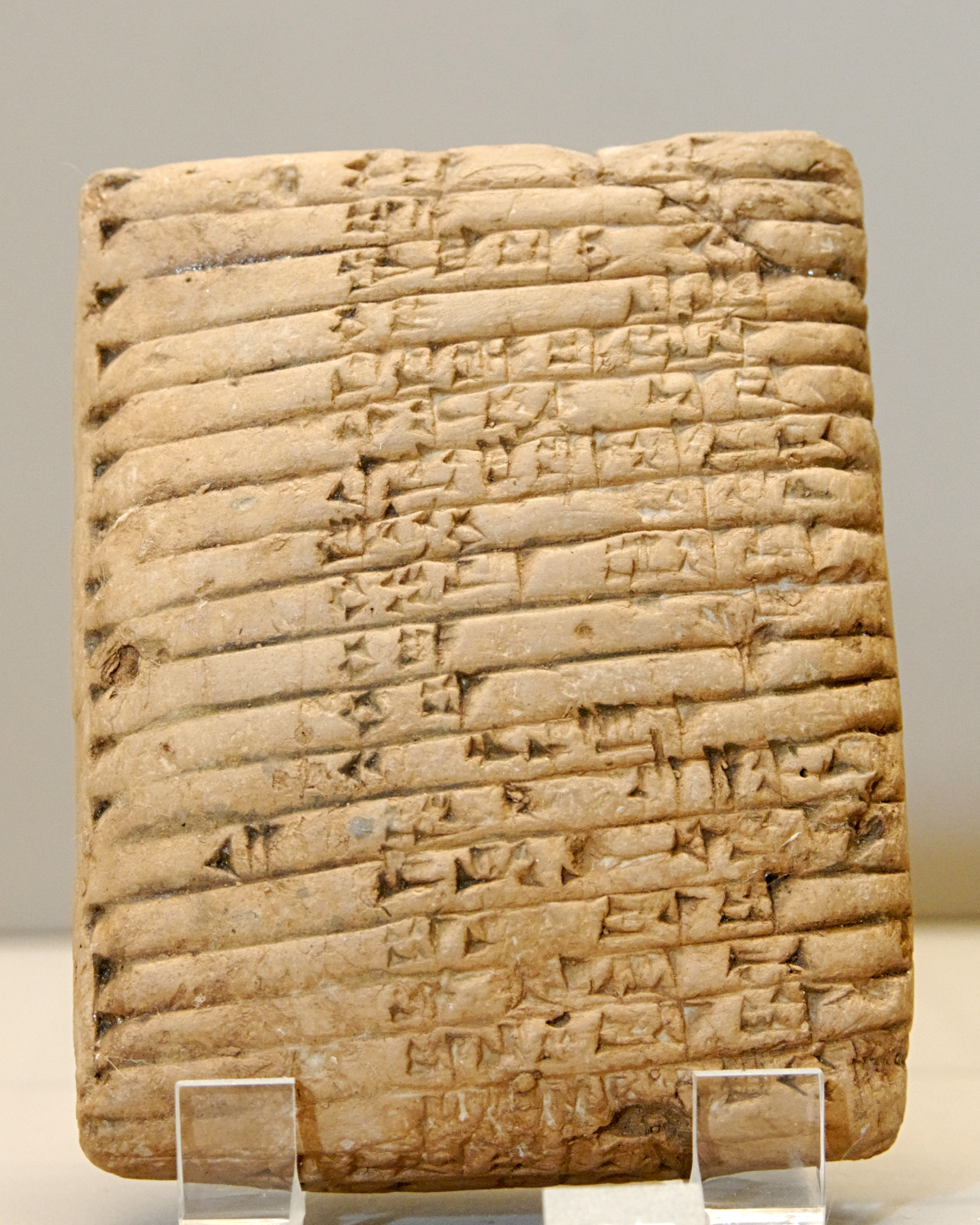
The Susanian Dynastic List—a regnal list dated to c. 1800 – c. 1600 BC and provenanced at Susa. Its current location is the Louvre Museum, Sb 17729. It names twelve kings for Awan and another twelve for Shimashki. The eponymous ruler Eparti II is the 9th named king on this list.

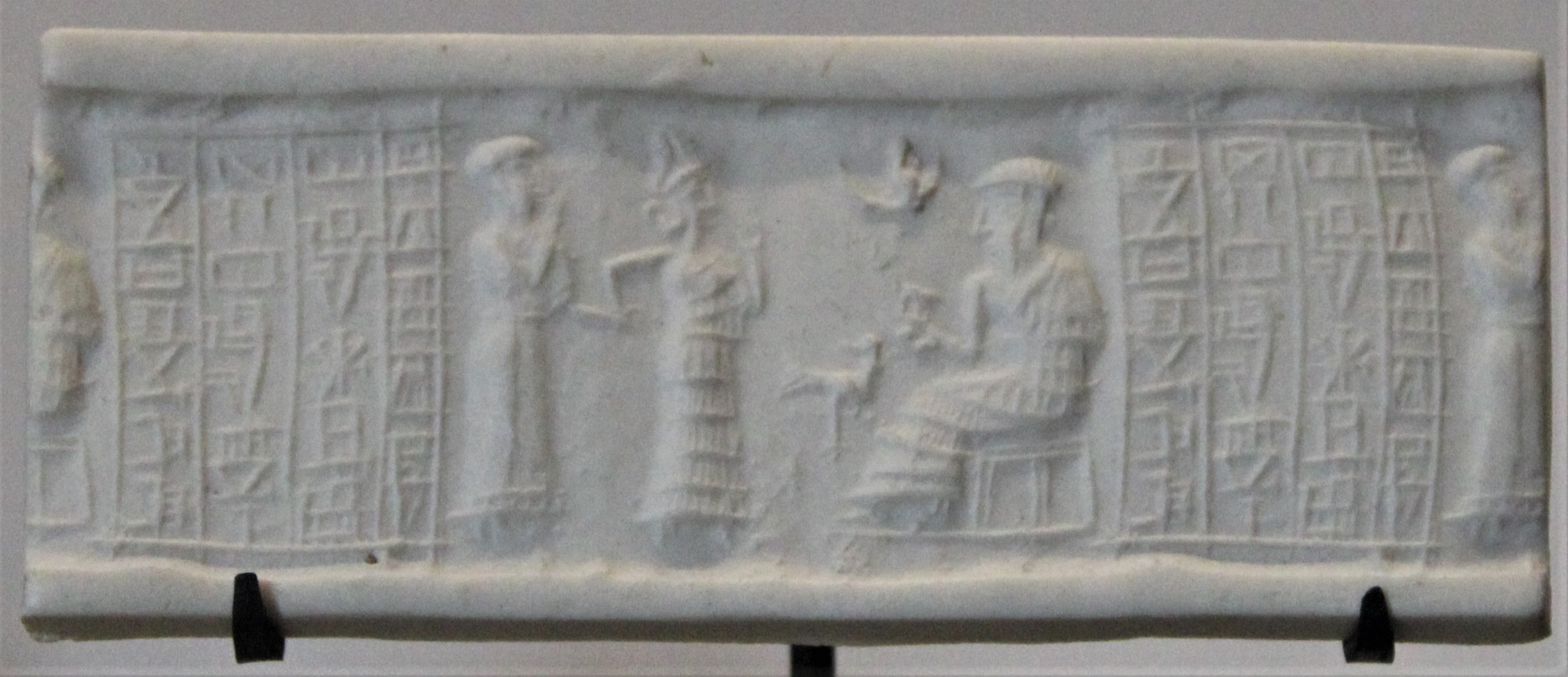
Seal impression of King Ebarat (𒂊𒁀𒊏𒀜), founder of the Sukkalmah Dynasty, also called "Epartid Dynasty" after him. He uses the title of king (𒈗 Šàr, pronounced Shar) in the inscription. Louvre Museum, reference Sb 6225. King Ebarat appears enthroned. The inscription reads "Ebarat the King. Kuk Kalla, son of Kuk-Sharum, servant of Shilhaha"

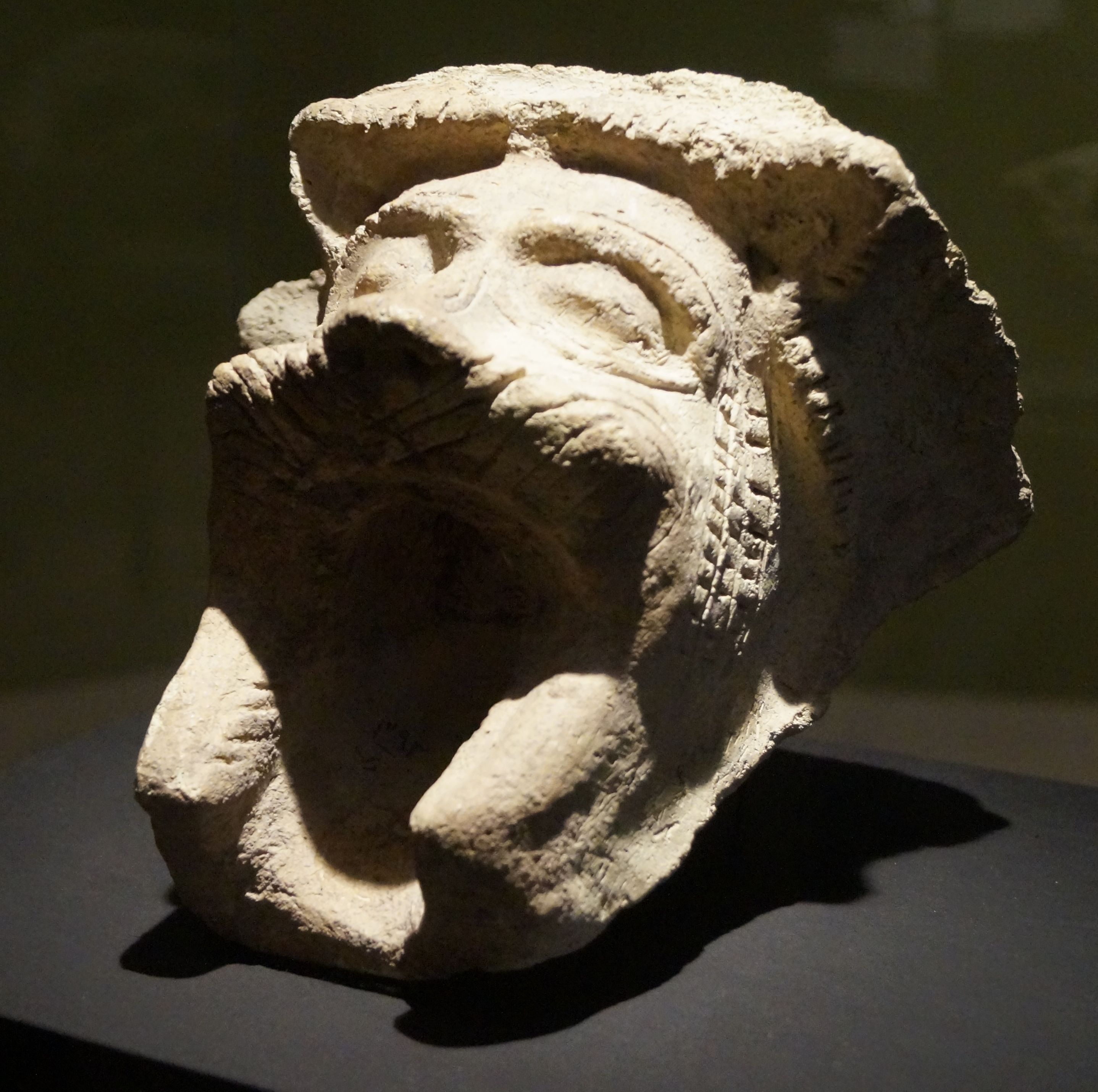
Sculpture of a lion as a fountain head, Susa, Sukkalmah period.

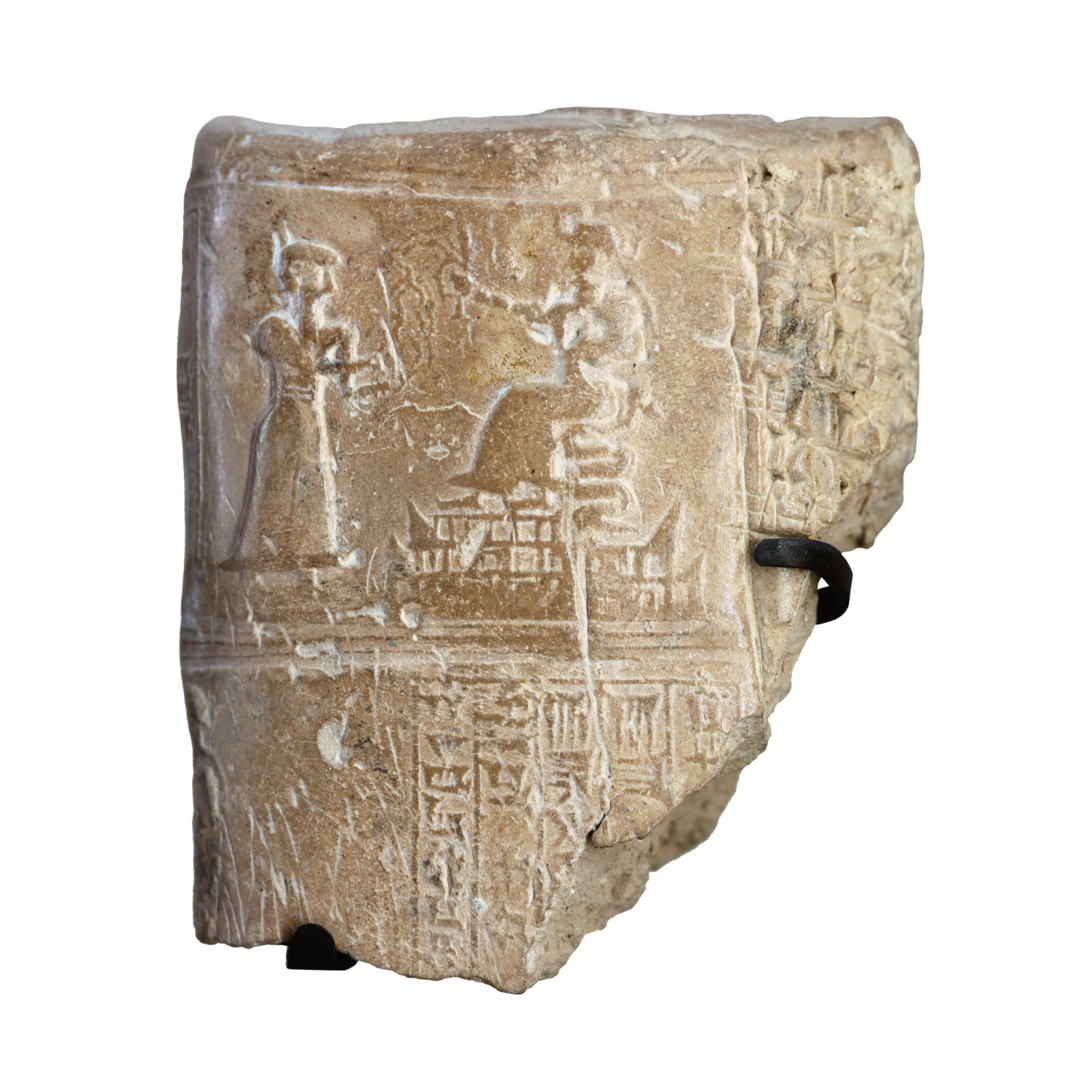
Sealed tablet with a serpent god, Susa circa 17th century BCE. Inscription: "Tan-Uli, sukkalmah, sukkal from Susa and Shimashki, son of the sister of Shilhaha".

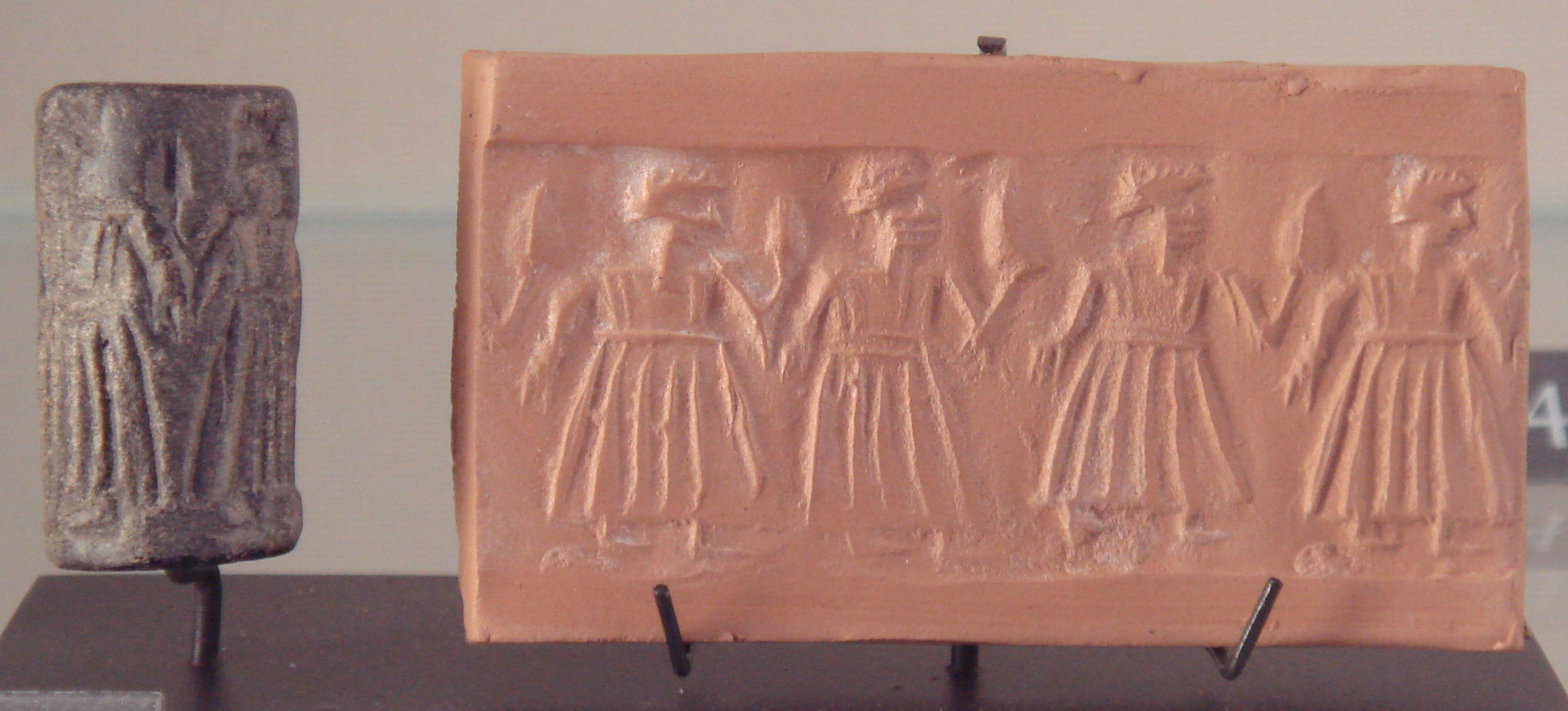
Men with daggers, Sukkalmah dynasty, 1940-1600 BCE, Susa, Louvre Museum Sb 1394.

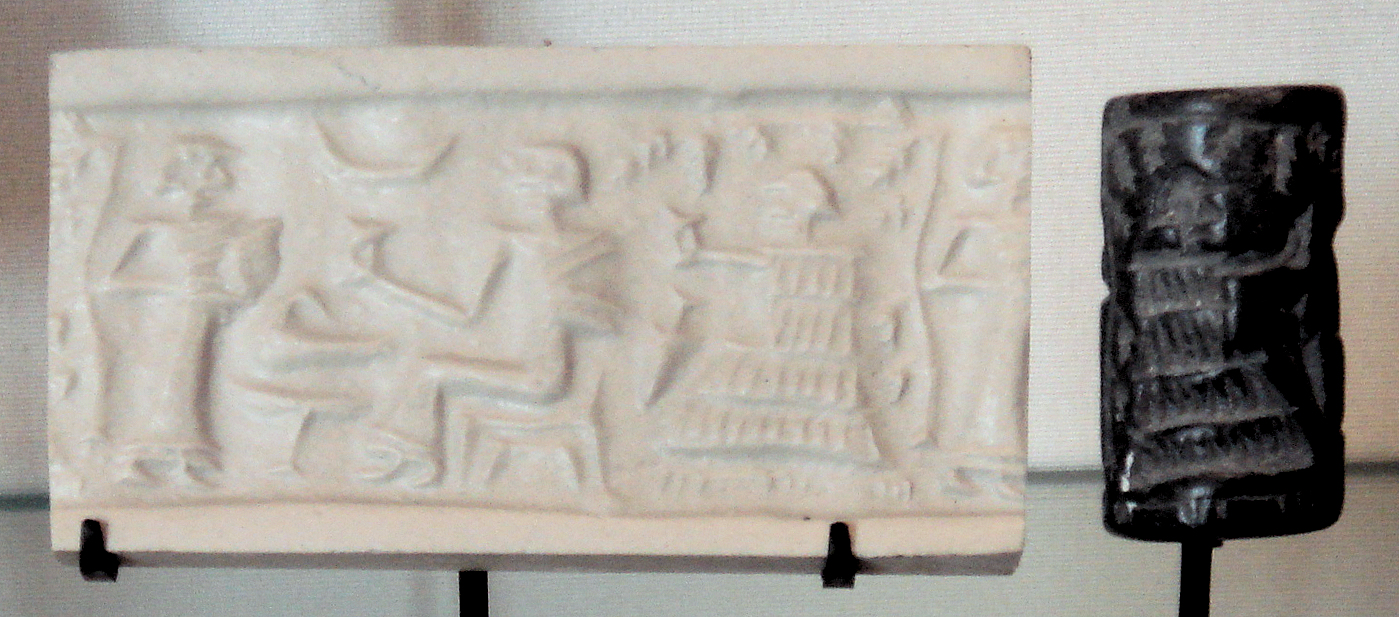
Sukkalmah Anshan cylinder, Louvre Museum, reference Sb 1515. Ruler enthroned, with his queen standing behind in a flouced garment, under overhanging vines.

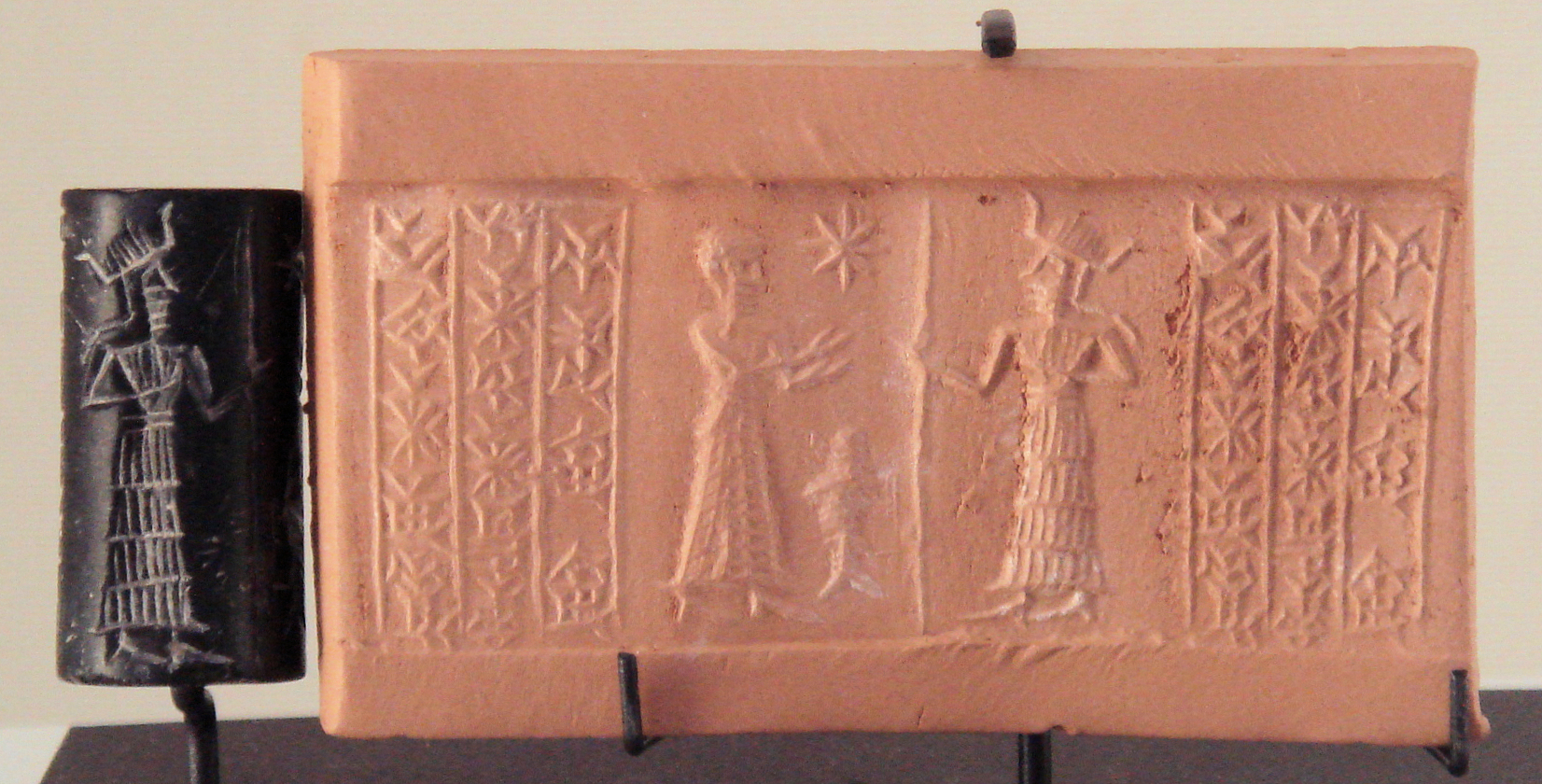
Seal of Adaia attendant to Nin-Shubur, Sukkalmah dynasty, 1940-1600 BCE, Susa, Louvre Museum Sb 1418.

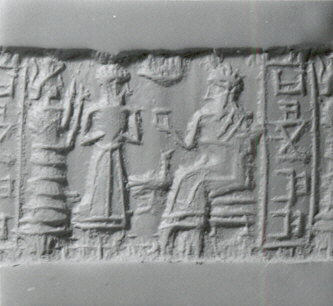
Cylinder seal mentioning Shilhaha, ca. 20th century B.C. Old Elamite

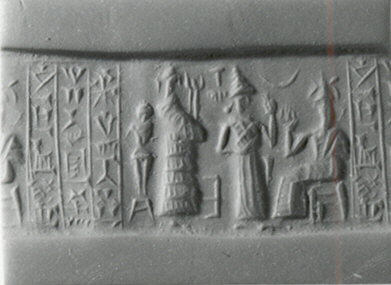
Cylinder seal, ca. 19th–18th century B.C. Elamite

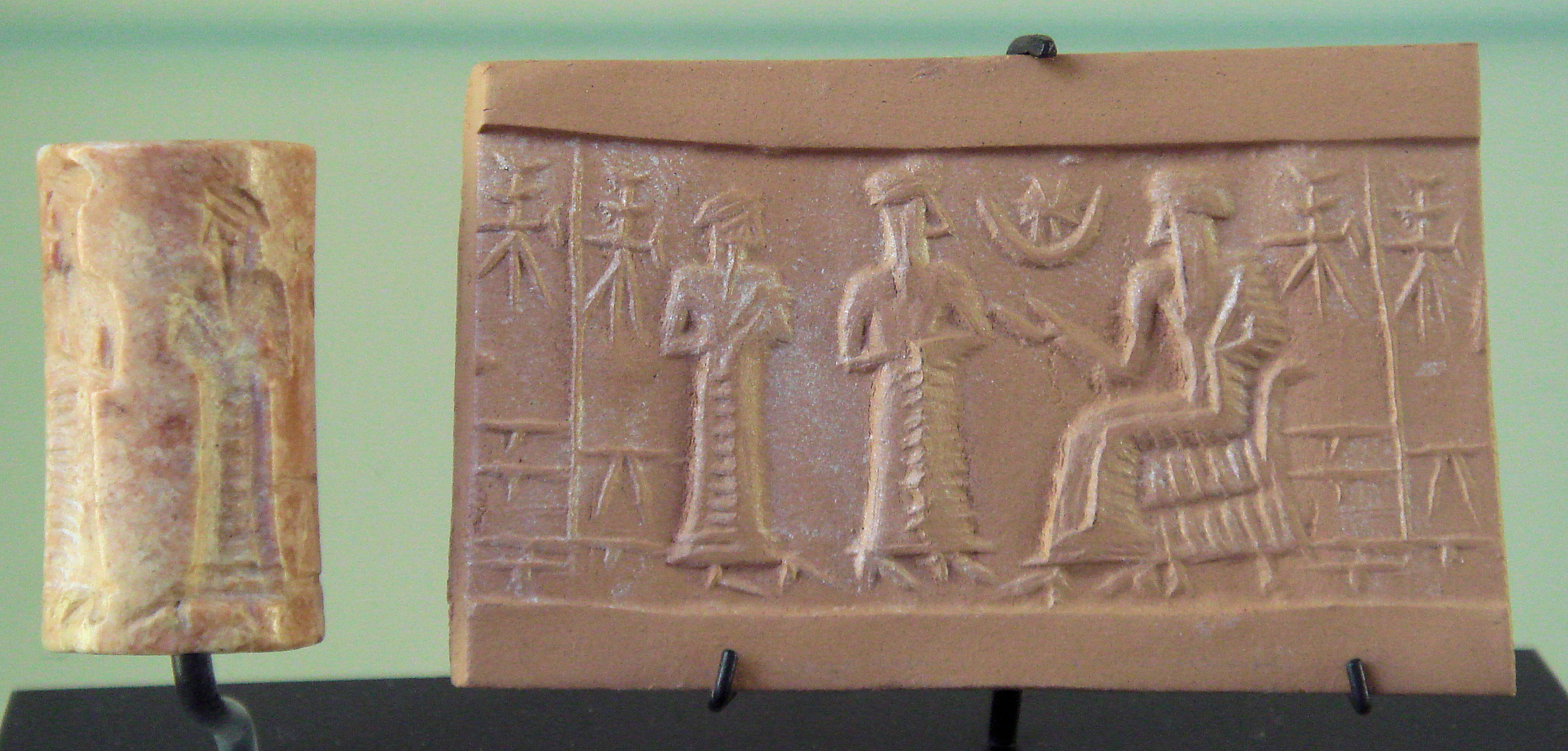
Reception seal, Sukkalmah dynasty, 1940-1600 BCE, Susa, Louvre Museum Sb 1440

== See also ==
- Elam
- Awan (ancient city)
- Awan dynasty
- Shimashki dynasty
- List of Elamite kings
- List of Assyrian kings
- List of kings of Babylon
- Sumerian King List
- List of kings of Akkad
- List of rulers of the pre-Achaemenid kingdoms of Iran
- List of monarchs of Iran
