= Siwe-Palar-Khuppak =

King of Elam
- Reign: c. 1778 – c. 1745 BC
- Predecessor: Shimut-wartash I
- Successor: Kuduzulush I
- Died: c. 1745 BC
- Father: Shirukduh

Siwe-Palar-Khuppak (died c. 1745 BC) was an Elamite Grand Regent (Elamite: Sukkalmah) from around 1778 to 1745 BC. As the ruler of Elam during this portion of the Middle Bronze Age, Siwe-Palar-Khuppak was quite involved in the politics of the ancient Near East, and he forged strong relationships with the powers of Mesopotamia, including Babylon.

== Placement in the Sukkalmah Dynasty ==
Siwe-Palar-Khuppak was one of the most important of Elam's rulers called Sukkalmahs. His father, Shirukduh, was a prominent Sukkalmah who had a vigorous foreign policy. Siwe-Palar-Khuppak was the second of three sons of Shirukduh. His brothers Shimut-wartash I and Kuduzulush I held high positions in Elamite government.

== Relations with Mesopotamian kingdoms ==
Around 1767 BC, Siwe-Palar-Khuppak formed a coalition with Zimri-Lim of Mari and Hammurabi of Babylon. He led this coalition against Eshnunna, conquering it and imposed direct rule from his sukkal Kudu-zulush in Susa. This coalition turned against him as he attempted to expand his power into Babylon, starting the Elamite War. Hammurabi, allied with Zimri-Lim, expelled the Elamite's forces from Eshnunna. One of his generals was Kunnam who appears in many letters found at Mari.

In a clay tablet, Siwe-Palar-Khuppak refers to himself as "Governor of Elam" and "Enlarger of the Empire". It is speculated that the tablet was made after Siwe-Palar-Khuppak's defeat by Hammurabi's coalition, and that the title "Enlarger of the Empire" refers to conquests made to west in modern Iran to offset his defeat. This hypothesis is supported by the fact that a 12th-century document lists Siwe-Palar-Khuppak as one of Elam's great men.
