= Shirukduh =

Elamite king of Anshan and Susa

Sukkalmah, King of Elam
- Reign: Early 18th century BC
- Predecessor: uncertain
- Successor: Siwe-Palar-Khuppak
- Dynasty: Sukkalmah dynasty

Shirukduh was an Elamite king who ruled over the Kingdom of Anshan and Susa. This ruler was one of the so-called Sukkalmahs, or Grand Regents, and ruled at a time roughly contemporary with that of Shamshi-Addu of the Kingdom of Upper Mesopotamia (r. 1808–1776 BC)

== Reign ==
Shirukduh forged an alliance with Shamshi-Addu and the ruler of Eshnunna for mutual protection against the hill tribes of the Zagros, especially the Gutians. Shirukduh had his own territorial ambitions as well. He raised an army of 12,000 and campaigned to the Lower Zab river. From this point onwards, Elam was able to prove itself as a military superpower in the Near East.

== See also ==
- Susa
- Ibal-pi'el II of Eshnunna
- Anshan
- Hammurabi of Babylon
