= Shimashki dynasty =

Dynasty in ancient Elam

Shimashki dynasty 𒈗𒂊𒋛𒈦𒄀𒆠 (Sumerian) Šimaški dynasty
- Dynasty
- A map of the Near East detailing the geopolitical situation in the region during the Shimashki dynasty c. 2000 BC occupied by various contemporaneous civilizations such as those of the: Mariotes Minoans Elamites Eblaites Egyptians Assyrians Sumerians Amorites Hurrians Dilmunites A clickable map of the present-day Islamic Republic of Iran detailing the locations of various ancient, archaeological sites, settlements, hamlets, villages, towns, and/or cities (and the approximated locations of four lost cities: Urua, Hidali, Hurti, and Kimash; also, the two lost capital cities of the Elamite Empire: Awan and Shimashki) that may have been visited, interacted and traded with, invaded, conquered, destroyed, occupied, colonized by and/or otherwise within the Elamites’ sphere of influence at some point temp. the dynasty of Shimashki.
- Parent family: Awan dynasty
- Country: Elam
- Earlier spellings: lugal-e-ne si-mash-gi^{ki}
- Etymology: Kings of the country of Simashgi
- Founded: c. 2220–2015 BC
- Founder: Girnamme (fl. c. 2033 BC); (Unknown, d. c. 2100 BC)
- Final ruler: Indattu-Inshushinak II (r. c. 1970 BC)
- Final head: Eparti II (m. c. 1973 BC)
- Historic seat: Shimashki
- Titles: List: Sukkalmah; Sukkal; Sukkal of Susa; Sukkal of Elam and Shimashki and Susa; Sukkal and Ippir of Susa; King of Anshan and Susa; King of Simashki; Enlarger of the Empire; Governor of Elam; Prince of Elam; Governor of Susa; Shepherd of the people of Susa; Shepherd of Inshushinak
- Connected families: Sukkalmah dynasty
- Dissolution: c. 1980–1790 BC
- Deposition: c. 1980–1830 BC
- The Elamites remained a major source of tension for the Sumerians, Akkadians, Amorites, Assyrians, Babylonians, and Kassites centuries after Kindattu’s victory over Ibbi-Sin from the third dynasty of Ur c. 2004 BC and Kindattu’s subsequent defeat by Ishbi-Erra from the dynasty of Isin c. 2001 BC.

The Shimashki dynasty (Note: Sumerian: 𒈗𒂊𒋛𒈦𒄀𒆠, romanized: Šimaški, lit. 'Kings of the country of Simashgi'; transliterated: lugal-e-ne si-mash-gi^{ki}; anglicized: Shimashki; alternatively: Simashki; also: Simaski) was an early dynasty of the ancient region of Elam, to the southeast of Babylonia, (c. 2100 – c. 1900 BC). A list of twelve kings of Shimashki is found in the Elamite king-list of Susa, which also contains a list of kings of Awan dynasty. It is uncertain how historically accurate the list is (and whether it reflects a chronological order), although some of its kings can be corroborated by their appearance in the records of neighboring peoples. The dynasty corresponds to the second Paleo-Elamite period (dated to c. 2015 – c. 1880 BC). It was followed by the Sukkalmah dynasty. Shimashki was likely near today's Masjed Soleyman.

== History ==
=== Gutian period (c. 2154 – c. 2112 BC) ===
Shimashki is first mentioned on the inscription to an image of Puzur-Inshushinak, king of Awan around 2100 BC, which depicts a Shimashkian king as subordinate to him. A royal inscription recorded "in a single day he made (those lands) fall prostrate at his feet; and, when the king of Šimaški came up (on learning about it), he seized the feet of PuzurInšušinak (in submission)".

Daryaee suggests that, despite the impression from the king-list that the rulers of Shimashki was a dynasty of sequential rulers, it is perhaps better to think of Shimashki as an alliance of various peoples "rather than a unitary state."

=== Ur III period (c. 2112 – c. 2004 BC) ===
The names in the king-list, as found in Potts, are "Girnamme, Tazitta, Ebarti, Tazitta, Lu[?]-[x-x-x]-lu-uh-ha-an, Kindattu, Idaddu, Tan-Ruhurater, Ebarti, Idaddu, Idaddu-napir, Idaddu-temti, twelve Sumerian kings" (bracketed letters original). An inscription establishes Idattu I was the son of Kindattu and the grandson of Ebarat (Yabrat/Ebarti) I.

Girnamme ruled at the same time as Shu-Sin, king of Ur, and was involved, as either a groom or simply a facilitator, in the marriage of Shu-Sin's daughter. Gwendolyn Leick places this event in 2037 BC. Girnamme, along with Tazitta and Ebarti I, appears in "Mesopotamian texts establishing food rations issued to messengers," texts from 2044 to 2032 BC.

Tazitta, the second figure in the list, is referred to in a document from the eighth year of the reign of Amar-Sin of Ur.

Ebarat I (Old Elamite ia-ab-ra-at), king number 3 in the Shimashki kings list (SKL). He is mentioned in several documents of Third Dynasty of Ur, from year 44 of Šulgi (the earliest) to year 8 of Šu-Sin. Documents show that he ruled at about the same time as Girnamme and at the same time as Tazitta, kings #1 and #2 from the SKL. The inscription on bronze bowl MS 4476 mentions Ebarat (^{d}e-ba-ra-at) as a father of Kindattu and grandfather of Idadu I, kings no 6 and 7 in the SKL. The spelling ia-a-ba-ra-at later became e-ba-ra-at and e-ba-ar-ti reflecting the historic shift of /’a/ to /e/ in Elamite.

The Shimashki confederacy led an alliance against the Ur III Empire, and managed to defeat its last ruler Ibbi-Sin. After this victory, they destroyed the kingdom, looted the capital of Ur, and ruled through military occupation for the next 21 years.

Kindattu was also known as Kindadu. A Kindattu, who according to Daryaeee was "apparently" the Shimashkian king of the list above, lead the army that destroyed the Third Dynasty of Ur in 2004 BC. The operation was a joint effort between Kindattu and his then-ally Ishbi-Erra, who defeated Ur and captured Ibbi-Sin, its king. The Ishbi-Erra hymn claims that Ishbi-Erra later expelled Kindattu from Mesopotamia.

=== Isin-Larsa period (c. 2004 to c. 1763 BC) ===
Idaddu I (also known as Indattu-Inshushinak, or simply Indattu) called himself "king of Shimashki and Elam". According to Stolper and André-Salvini, he was the son of Kindattu, while Gwendolyn Leick calls him "son of Pepi," claiming that Kindattu may have been his grandfather. According to Leick he ascended to the throne of Shimashki around 1970 BC.

Tan-Ruhurater, also known as Tan-Ruhuratir, formed an alliance with Bilalama, the governor of Eshnunna, by marrying Bilama's daughter Mê-Kubi.

Ebarti II of Shimashki may have been the same individual known as Ebarat, a Sukkalmah, or "Grand Regent". If so, he was ruler simultaneously to the next member of the list of twelve Shimaskin kings: Idaddu II.

Idaddu II was the son of Tan-Ruhurater, during whose reign he oversaw building projects as the governor of Susa. According to Leick, he was the last of the Shimashkian kings.

The Shimashki rulers became participants in an ongoing conflict with the rulers of Isin and Larsa after the fall of Third Dynasty of Ur.

Under the Shimashki and their successors the Sukkalmah, Elam then became one of the most powerful kingdoms of West Asia, influencing the territories of Mesopotamia and Syria through commercial, military or diplomatic contacts. Expansion in Mesopotamia was only halted by the Babylonian king Hammurabi in the 18th century BC. After a prolonged conflict, the military forces of Elam were finally forced to retreat their forces positioned along the Tigris river, and to return to Susa.

The Shimashki dynasty was followed by the Sukkalmah dynasty (c. 1900–1500).

== List of rulers ==
The following list should not be considered complete:

#	Portrait	Name	Succession	Title	Approx. dates	Notes
Gutian period (c. 2154 – c. 2119 BC)
		Unknown	Unclear succession	King of Shimashki	Uncertain, fl. c. 2240 – c. 2100 BC d. c. 2100 BC	temp. of Puzur-Inshushinak
Awan dynasty (c. 2600 – c. 2120 BC)
12th		Puzur-Inshushinak 𒅤𒊭𒀭𒈹𒂞	Nephew of Khita (?)	Military Governor of Elam Governor of Susa Mighty King of Elam King of Awan	Uncertain, fl. c. 2240 – c. 2100 BC	temp. of Puzer-Mama; temp. of Gudea; temp. of Ur-Nammu
"Twelve kings of Awan." — Susanian Dynastic List
Ur III period (c. 2119 – c. 2025 BC)
Shimashki dynasty (c. 2120 – c. 1980 BC)
		Girnamme I (?)	Unclear succession	King of Shimashki	Uncertain, fl. c. 2120 – c. 2028 BC	
		Ebarat I (?) 𒂊𒁀𒊏𒀜	Relative of Gir-Namme I (?)	King of Shimashki	Uncertain, fl. c. 2120 – c. 2028 BC	
1st		Girnamme II	Relative of Ebarat I (?)	King of Shimashki	Uncertain, fl. c. 2120 – c. 2028 BC	temp. of Shulgi
3rd		Ebarat II 𒂊𒁀𒊏𒀜	Relative of Tazitta I	King of Shimashki	Uncertain, fl. c. 2120 – c. 2028 BC	temp. of Shulgi
2nd		Tazitta I	Relative of Gir-Namme I (?)	King of Shimashki	Uncertain, fl. c. 2120 – c. 2028 BC	temp. of Amar-Sin
4th		Tazitta II	Unclear succession	King of Shimashki	Uncertain, fl. c. 2120 – c. 2028 BC	temp. of Shu-Sin
Isin-Larsa period (c. 2025 – c. 1894 BC)
6th		Kindattu 𒆠𒅔𒁕𒌅	Son of Ebarat I (?)	King of Shimashki	Uncertain, fl. c. 2028 – c. 2001 BC (26 years)	Conquered Ur c. 2004 BC; temp. of Ishbi-Erra
		Imazu	Son of Kindattu	King of Anshan	Uncertain, fl. c. 2015 BC	temp. of Shu-Ilishu
5th		Lurak-Luhhan	Unclear succession	King of Shimashki		temp. of Shu-Sin
		Tan-Ruhuratir I (?)	Same person as Lurak-Luhhan (?)	King of Shimashki		temp. of Shu-Sin
		Hutran-Temti I (?)	Same person as Kindattu (?)	King of Shimashki		temp. of Shu-Sin
7th		Indattu-Inshushinak I 𒀭𒄿𒁕𒁺	Son of Hutran-Temti I (?)	King of Shimashki	Uncertain, reigned c. 1970 BC	temp. of Ibbi-Sin
8th		Tan-Ruhuratir II	Son of Indattu-Inshushinak I (?)	King of Shimashki	Uncertain, r. c. 1945 – c. 1925 BC	temp. of Iddin-Dagan
		Indattu-Inshushinak II (?)	Son of Tan-Ruhuratir I (?)	King of Shimashki		temp. of Bilalama
Epartid dynasty (c. 1980 – c. 1850 BC)
9th		Ebarat III 𒂊𒁀𒊏𒀜	Unclear succession	Sukkalmah King of Anshan and Susa King of Shimashki	Uncertain, fl. c. 1980 – c. 1928 BC	temp. of Iddin-Dagan
10th		Indattu-Inshushinak III 𒀭𒄿𒁕𒁺	Son of Pepi	King of Shimashki	Uncertain, r. c. 1925 – c. 1870 BC (≥3 years)	temp. of Gungunum
		Shilhaha	Son of Ebarat II	Sukkalmah King of Anshan and Susa	Uncertain, fl. c. 1980 – c. 1928 BC	
		Kuk-Nashur I	Son of Shilhaha	Sukkalmah	Uncertain, fl. c. 1980 – c. 1928 BC	
Sukkalmah dynasty (c. 1850 – c. 1450 BC)
		Palar-Ishshan	Unclear succession	Sukkalmah	Uncertain, fl. c. 1980 – c. 1928 BC	
		Kuk-Sanit	Son of Palar-Ishshan (?)		Uncertain, fl. c. 1980 – c. 1928 BC	
		Lankuku	Father of Kuk-Kirwash		Uncertain, fl. c. 1980 – c. 1928 BC	
		Kuk-Kirwash	Nephew of Palar-Ishshan (?)	Sukkalmah Sukkal of Elam and Shimashki and Susa	Uncertain, fl. c. 1980 – c. 1928 BC	
		Tem-Sanit	Son of Kuk-Kirwash		Uncertain, fl. c. 1928 – c. 1894 BC	
		Kuk-Nahhunte	Son of Kuk-Kirwash		Uncertain, fl. c. 1928 – c. 1894 BC	
Old Babylonian period (c. 1894 – c. 1450 BC)
		Attakhushu	Son of Kuk-Nashur I (?)	Sukkal and Ippir of Susa Shepherd of the people of Susa Shepherd of Inshushinak	Uncertain, fl. c. 1928 – c. 1894 BC	
		Tetep-Mada	Son of Kuk-Nashur I (?)	Shepherd of the people of Susa	Uncertain, fl. c. 1928 – c. 1894 BC	
11th		Idattunapir	Unclear succession	King of Shimashki	Uncertain, fl. c. 1894 – c. 1792 BC	temp. of Sumuabum
12th		Idattutemti	Unclear succession	King of Shimashki	Uncertain, fl. c. 1894 – c. 1792 BC	
"Twelve kings of Shimashki." — Susanian Dynastic List
		Shirukduh	Descendant of Shilhaha (?)	Sukkalmah	Uncertain, fl. c. 1792 – c. 1778 BC	temp. of Shamshi-Adad I
		Siwe-Palar-Khuppak	Son of Shirukduh (?)	Sukkalmah Sukkal of Susa Prince of Elam	Uncertain, reigned c. 1778 – c. 1745 BC	temp. of Hammurabi
		Tan-Uli	Unclear succession	Sukkalmah Sukkal	Uncertain, fl. c. 1745 – c. 1650 BC	
		Temti-Halki	Son of Tan-Uli (?)	Sukkalmah Sukkal of Elam and Simashki and Susa	Uncertain, fl. c. 1745 – c. 1650 BC	

== Gallery ==
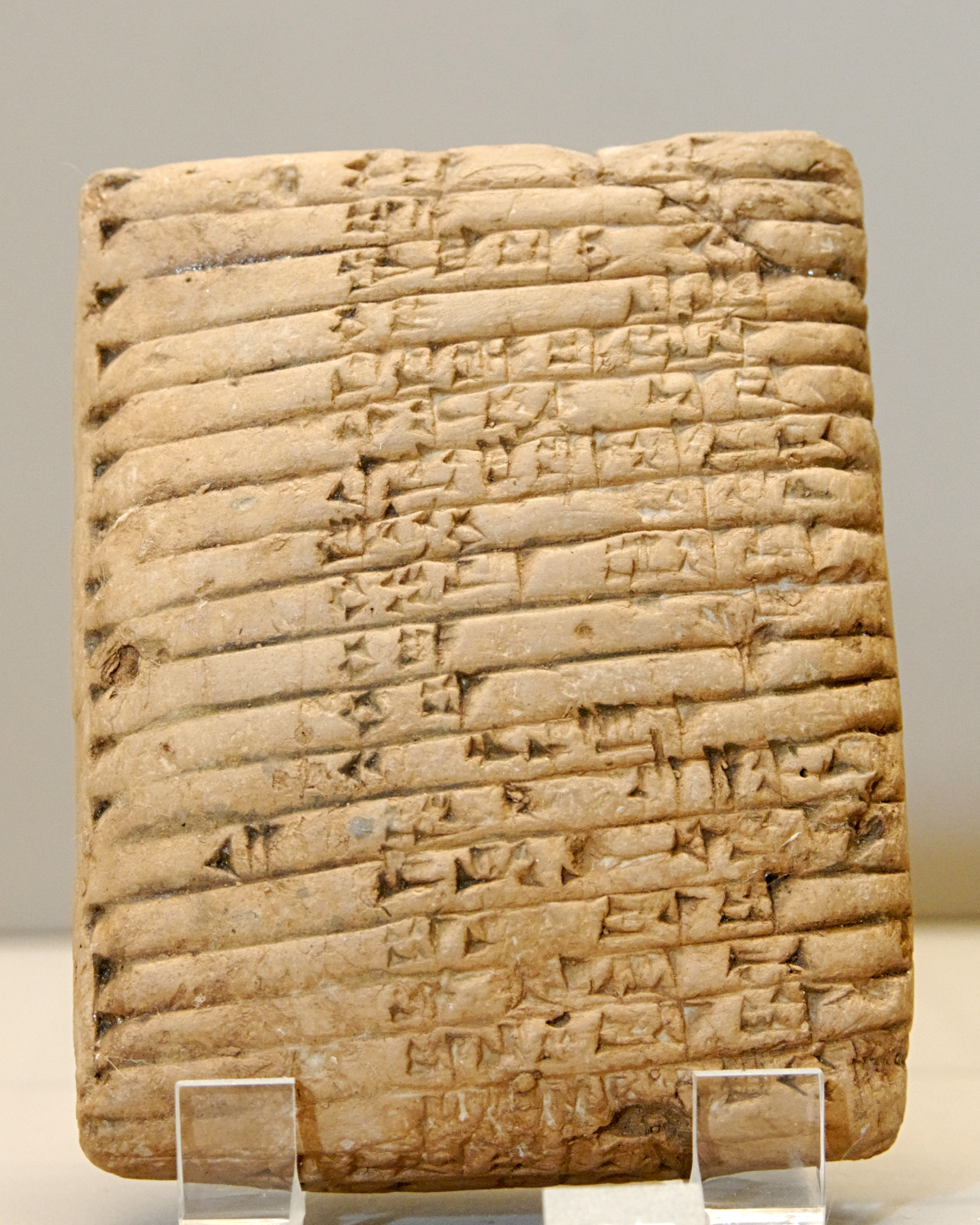
The Susanian Dynastic List—a regnal list dated to c. 1800 – c. 1600 BC and provenanced at Susa. Its current location is the Louvre Museum, Sb 17729. It names twelve kings for Awan and another twelve for Shimashki. The eponymous ruler Eparti II is the 9th named king on this list.

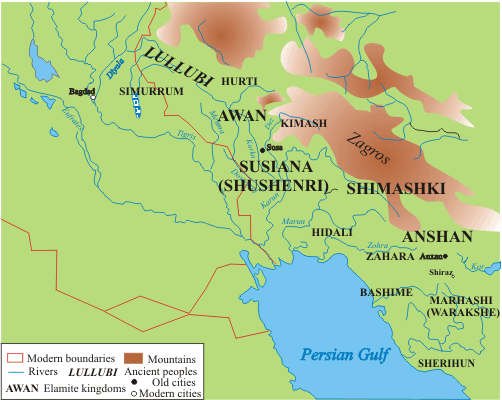
A map of the Near East detailing various ancient regions that may have been occupied by the Elamites c. 3500 – c. 2000 BC. Included are the regions of Bashime, Marhasi, Shimashki, Lullubum, Simurrum, Anshan, Awan, Susiana, Hidali, Hurti, Kimash, Sherihun, and Zahara.

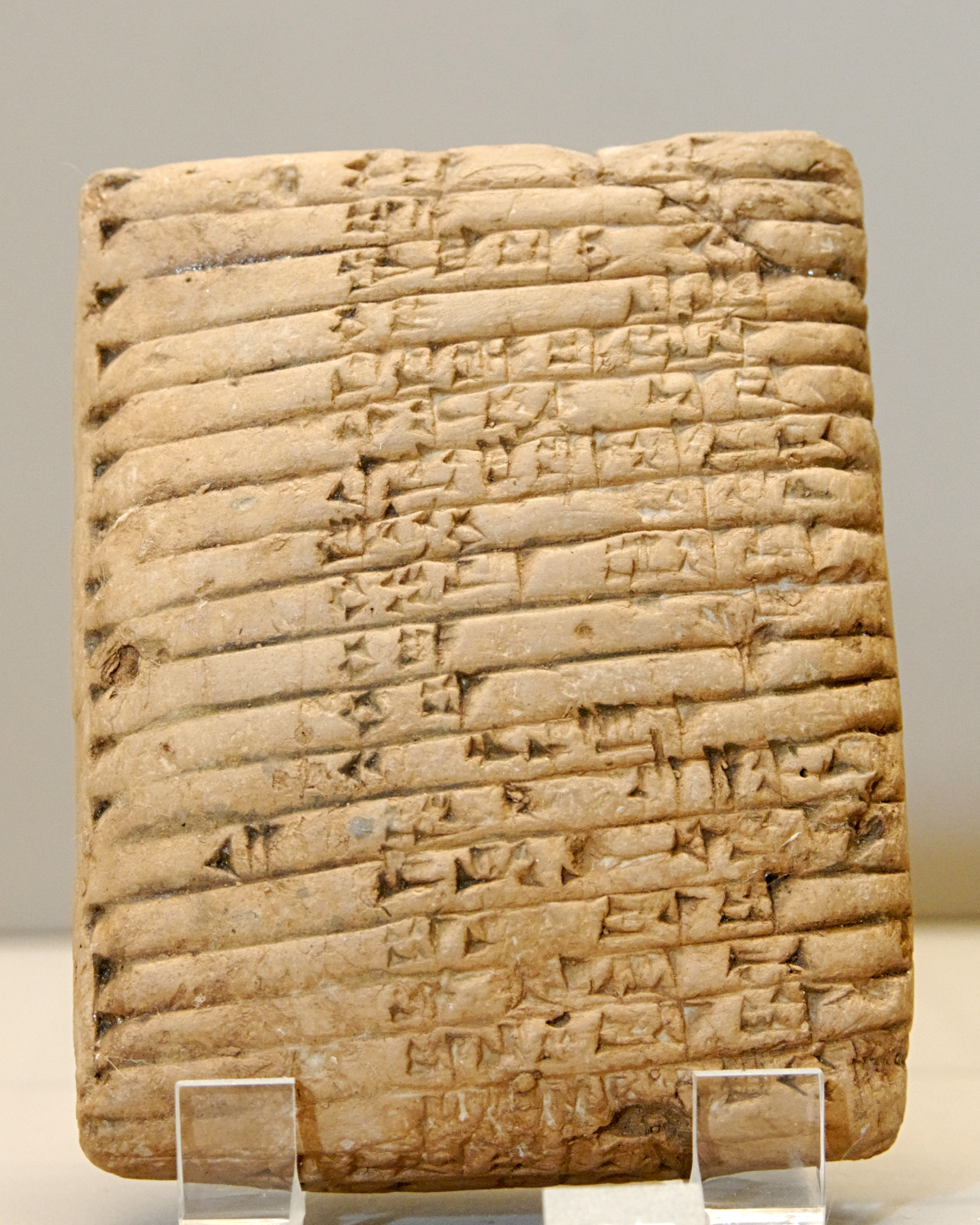
Dynastic list of twelve kings of the Awan dynasty and twelve kings of the Shimashki dynasty, 1800–1600 BC, Louvre Museum

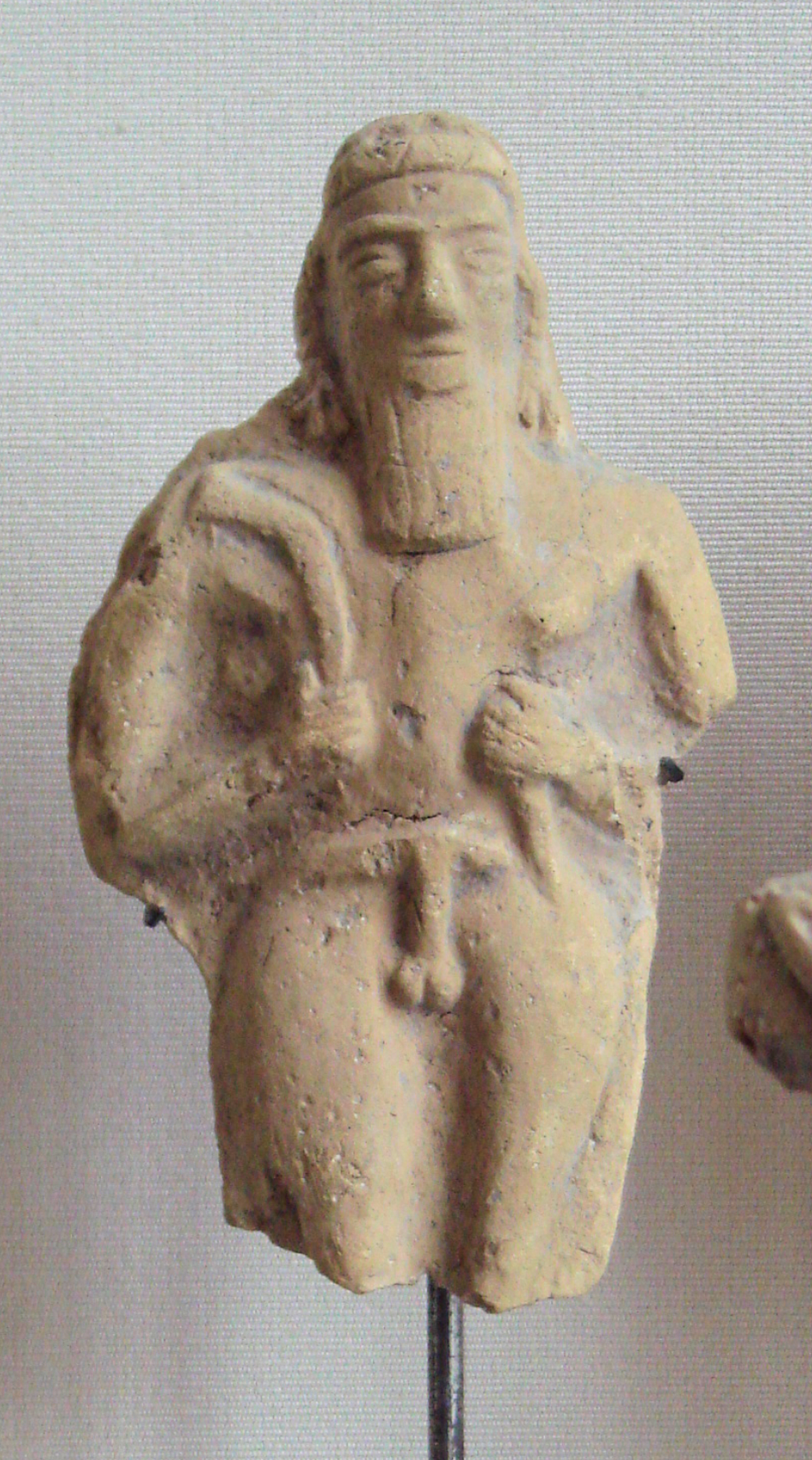
Nude man with weapons Ur III Shimashki dynasty 2000–1940 BC. Louvre Museum

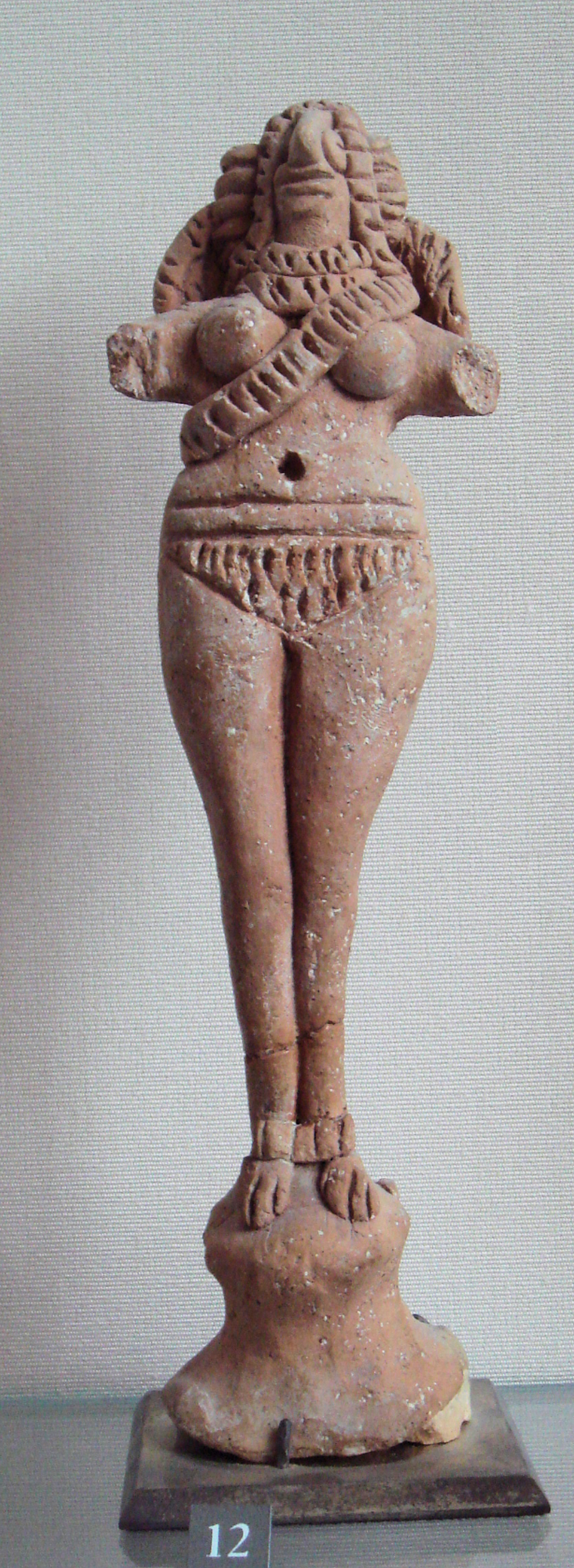
Nude woman statuette Ur III Shimashki dynasty 2000–1940 BC. Louvre Museum

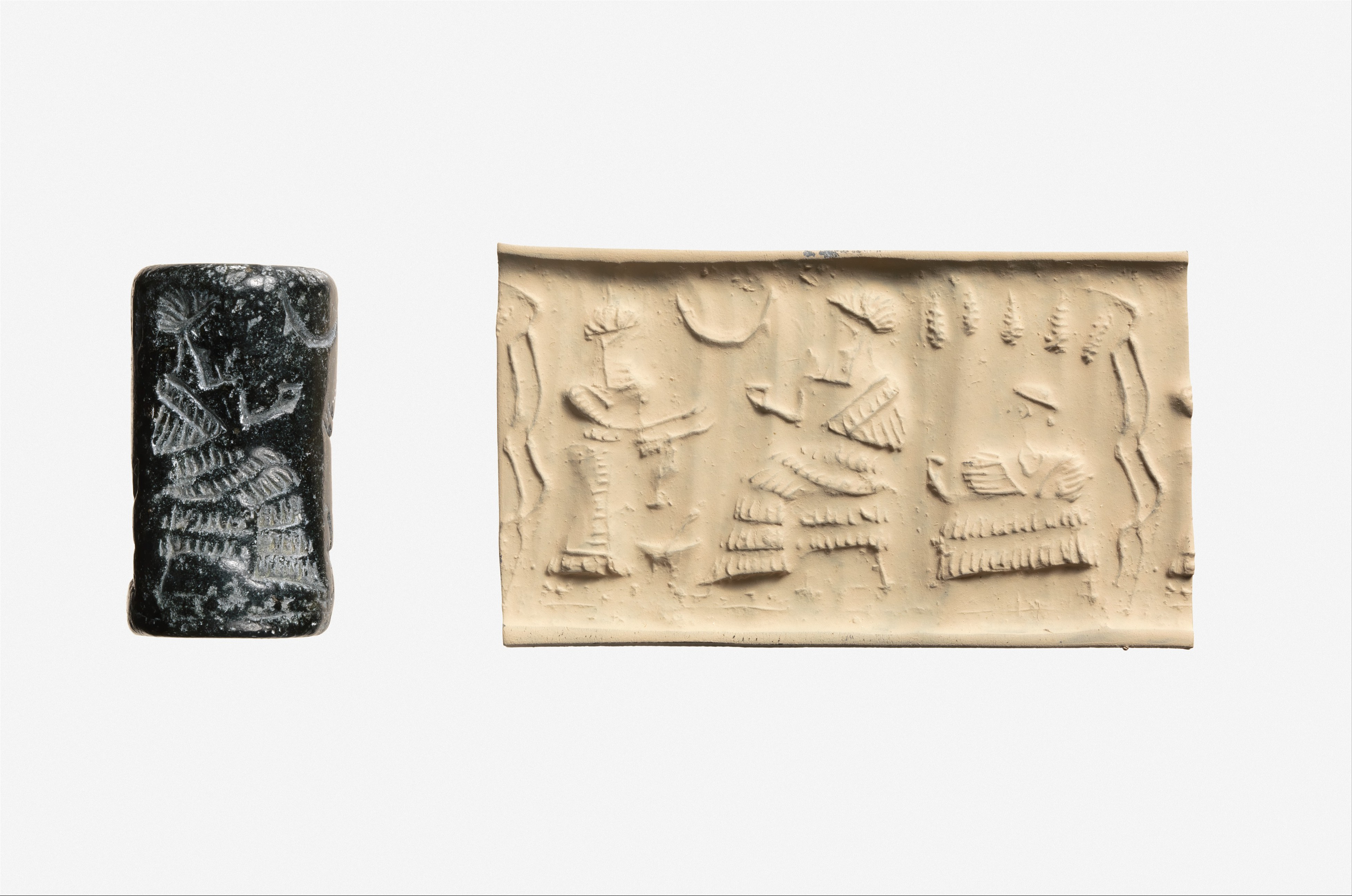
Cylinder seal and modern impression. Worshiper before a seated ruler or deity, seated female under a grape arbor, Old Elamite, ca early 2nd millennium BC

== See also ==
- Elam
- Awan (ancient city)
- Awan dynasty
- Sukkalmah dynasty
- List of rulers of Elam
- List of Assyrian kings
- List of kings of Babylon
- Sumerian King List
- List of kings of Akkad
- List of rulers of the pre-Achaemenid kingdoms of Iran
- List of monarchs of Persia
