= Kunnam of Elam =

18th century BCE military expedition leader

Kunnam
- Allegiance: Elam
- Service years: c. 1764 BC

Kunnam (fl. c. 1764 BC) also often called Kunnam of Elam was a military expedition leader of the kingdom of Elam in the 18th century BC. He was part of a military campaign into Mesopotamia and is mainly known from cuneiform letters found at Mari, a Syrian city state where there are the royal archives preserved. He was a contemporary of Zimri-Lim of Mari and Hammurabi of Babylon.

The King of Elam connected with the military expedition is not mentioned in the texts from Mari as an aggressor, but for chronological reasons it was most likely Siwe-Palar-Khuppak, who tried to get control over Mesopotamia. During the Elamite War, attacked several cities and was only defeated in year 30 of King Hammurabi. Kunnam guided the expedition against Tell Shubat-Enlil (most likely Tell Leilan) and entered the city with a huge army. He installed there Ibni-Addu as king of Tadum. Kunnam had the reputation of always telling the truth and is several times described as drunken.
