= Napir-Asu =

Elamite queen

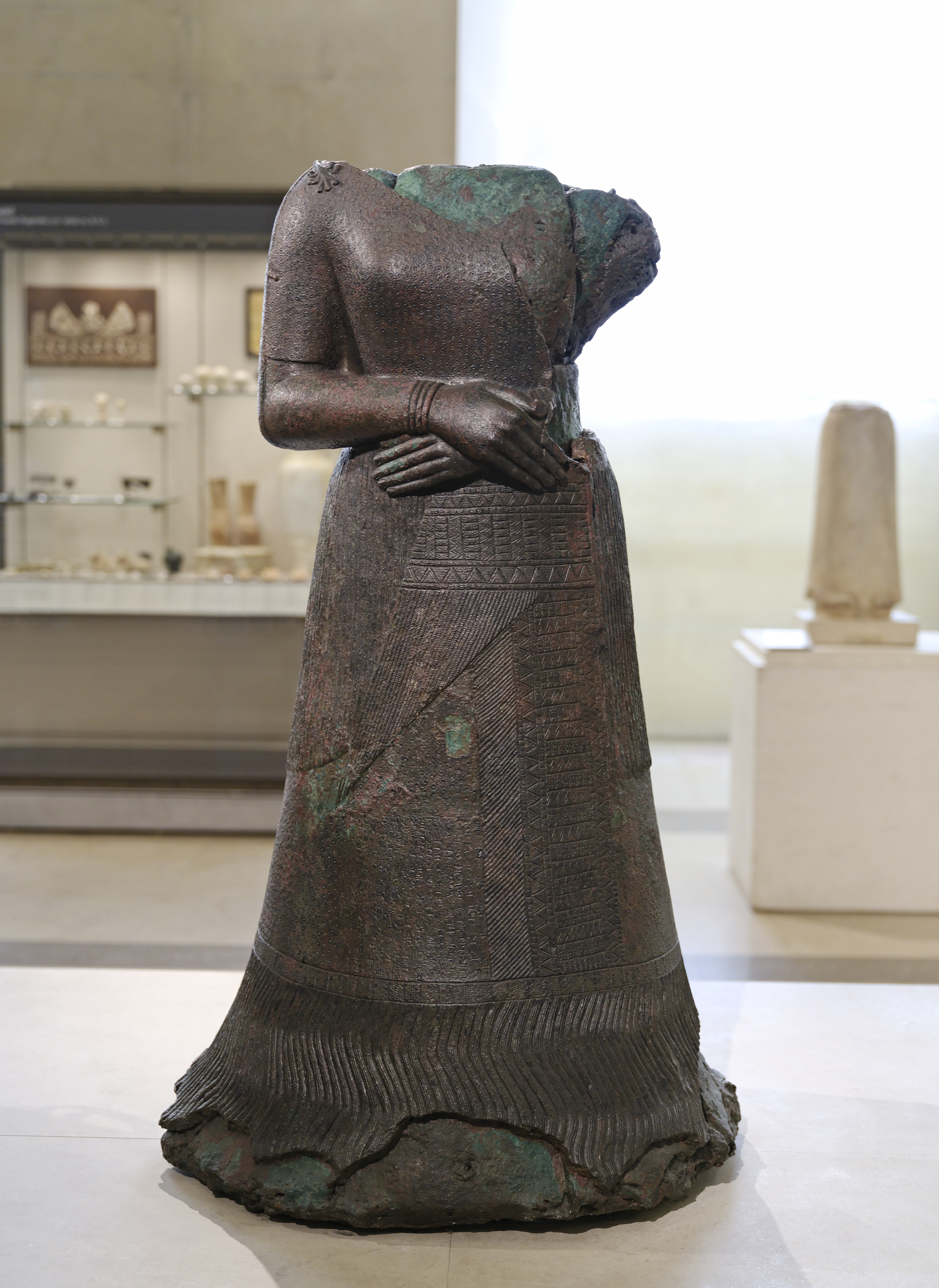
- Statue of Napir-Asu, wife of Untash-Napirisha in Louvre Museum

Queen consort of Elam
- Tenure: circa 1300 BC
- Spouse: Untash-Napirisha

Napir Asu (circa 1300 BC) was an Elamite queen and wife of King Untash-Napirisha represented in a mutilated copper and bronze statue widely regarded as a masterpiece of ancient metalwork. The sculpture provides one of the finest surviving representations of elite garments from antiquity and constitutes one of the rare extant depictions of a royal queen.

== Biography ==
It is likely that Napir-Asu corresponds to the daughter of the Babylonian Burnaburiash (perhaps the king Burna-Buraish II) married by Untash-Napirisha. A statue of the god Immiriya in Chogha Zanbil was dedicated by Napir-Asu's husband Untash-Napirisha to his father-in-law Burnaburiash. (Note: In the dedication, the part of the text mentioning the Babylonian king is damaged. In François Vallat's opinion, shared by Daniel T. Potts, […]i-ia-áš should be read as [Bur-na]-bur-ia-áš; E. Reiner prefers a geographical interpretation, proposing [tup-l]i-ia-áš; according to other historians, the damaged text should be restored as [kaš-ti-l]i-ia-áš, actually referring to Kashtiliash IV.) There is a letter that has survived which describes Untash-Napirisha marrying a daughter of a Burna-Buraish. However there is some debate as to whether the Burna-Burnish in the letter is in fact the king, or a later descendant.

Nevertheless it does appear that Napir-Asu was the first Elamite royal woman to be depicted on a limestone stele with her husband. Napir-Asu appears to also be the first Elamite queen whose name is inscribed on her body in statue form. The stele depicts Napir-Asu, Untash-Napirisha and his mother, the priestess Utik. Historians Esfandyar Rahmati Kia and Kolsoum Ghazanfari have argued that Napir-Asu held some power in her own right.

== Details ==
Statue of Napir-Asu; Louvre Museum, SB 2731 https://collections.louvre.fr/ark:/53355/cl010176829
Details: H. 1.29 m, L. 0.73 m, Weight 1750 kg; copper, bronze.

Main References: Scheil 1904: 1-6, No. 45; Lampre 1905: 245-250, Pls. 15-16; Amiet 1966: 372, No. 280; Spycket 1981: 309, fig. 204; Tallon 1992: 132-135; Meyers 2000; Helwing 2018; Álvarez-Mon 2020: 302-303, Pl. 121; Wicks 2021.

The Statue of Queen Napir Asu: https://www.youtube.com/watch?v=qPEMaej_N8k&t=46s

== Introduction ==
In 1903 archaeologist Jacques de Morgan, working as part of the Délégation scientifique française en Perse, discovered a 130cm high statue, made of a bronze core, covered by a layer of copper, with cast and chased decoration, weighing 1750 kg. It was found in the upper rooms of the temple of Ninhursag in Susa. It is also the largest example of Elamite bronze sculpture known. Since the statue was placed in the temple, curator Françoise Tallon has argued that the statue represented the queen in "perpetual prayer".

The statue stands as one of the largest surviving metal sculptures of antiquity and remains among the most celebrated masterpieces of Elamite art. Henri Frankfort described it as “a triumph of the Elamite metalworkers” and “the most perfect realization in bronze of a plastic ideal.” Françoise Tallon likewise emphasized its “innovative technique and technical prowess of manufacture,” seeing it as a striking demonstration of the mastery achieved by Elamite metallurgical workshops during the reign of Untash-Napirisha, as well as of the vigour of his rule.

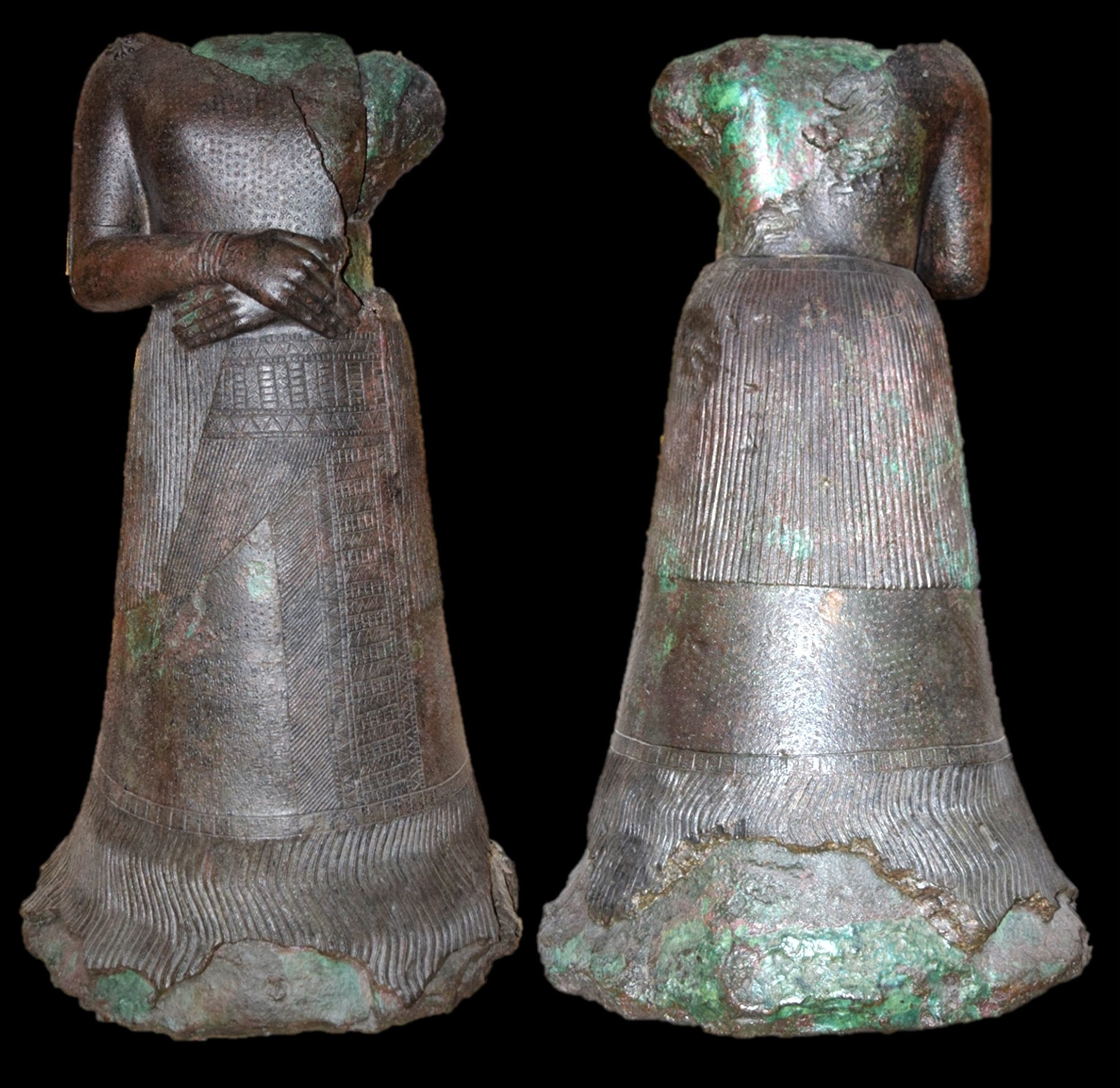
Statue of Napir Asu (By J. Alvarez-Mon)

== Manufacture ==
The statue was produced through an exceptionally sophisticated process, involving a bronze core and a copper outer shell cast separately. The principal stages of manufacture can be reconstructed as follows according to Meyers 2000.

1. A clay core was constructed by layering bricks on top of one another. Metal bars were laid crosswise at the base and again at a height of about 55 cm, before further bricks were added to bring the core to shoulder level.
2. The clay core was dried, and possibly fired, to harden it.
3. The dried core was coated with a thick layer of wax, on which the sculptor modeled the body, garment details, ornaments, feet, arms, and hands (but not the head). The wax thickness averaged 2–2.5 cm, increasing to more than 10 cm around the hands and feet.
4. Copper and bronze chaplets were inserted through the wax into the core to secure it during casting. Nine chaplets remain visible today (each 0.6 x 0.6 cm in cross-section), though more than 100 would originally have been required.
5. A clay investment (mold) was applied over the wax model.
6. The entire assembly was placed in a furnace: the clay mold was fired, while the wax melted and drained away, leaving a cavity for the metal.
7. Molten copper was then poured into the cavity left by the wax, probably in a single operation or in several rapid pourings.
8. Once cooled, the clay investment was broken away, the chaplets removed or cut flush, and the surface cleaned and polished.
9. The hollow statue was inverted, the clay core extracted, and the void filled with molten bronze. The alloy averages 11% tin and is remarkably homogeneous, indicating a single pour.
10. The metal crossbars supporting the core were removed.
11. The separately cast head was attached.
12. Either before or after casting the bronze core, the Elamite inscription was engraved, the surface was refined through chasing, and decorative details were enhanced with foil in precious metals such as gold or silver.

== Inscription ==
On the fringed skirt of this statue, the names of the queen and the great gods of Susa are engraved in Elamite cuneiform. There is a ring on the queen's left hand, which is probably her wedding ring. On the skirt of this statue and in the language of the queen, a curse is written:

I, Napir-Asu, wife of Untash-Napirisha. He who would seize my statue, who would smash it, who would destroy its inscription, who would erase my name, may he be smitten by the curse of Napirisha, of Kiririsha, and of Inshushinak, that his name shall become extinct, that his offspring be barren, that the forces of Beltiya, the great goddess, shall sweep down on him. This is Napir-Asu's offering.

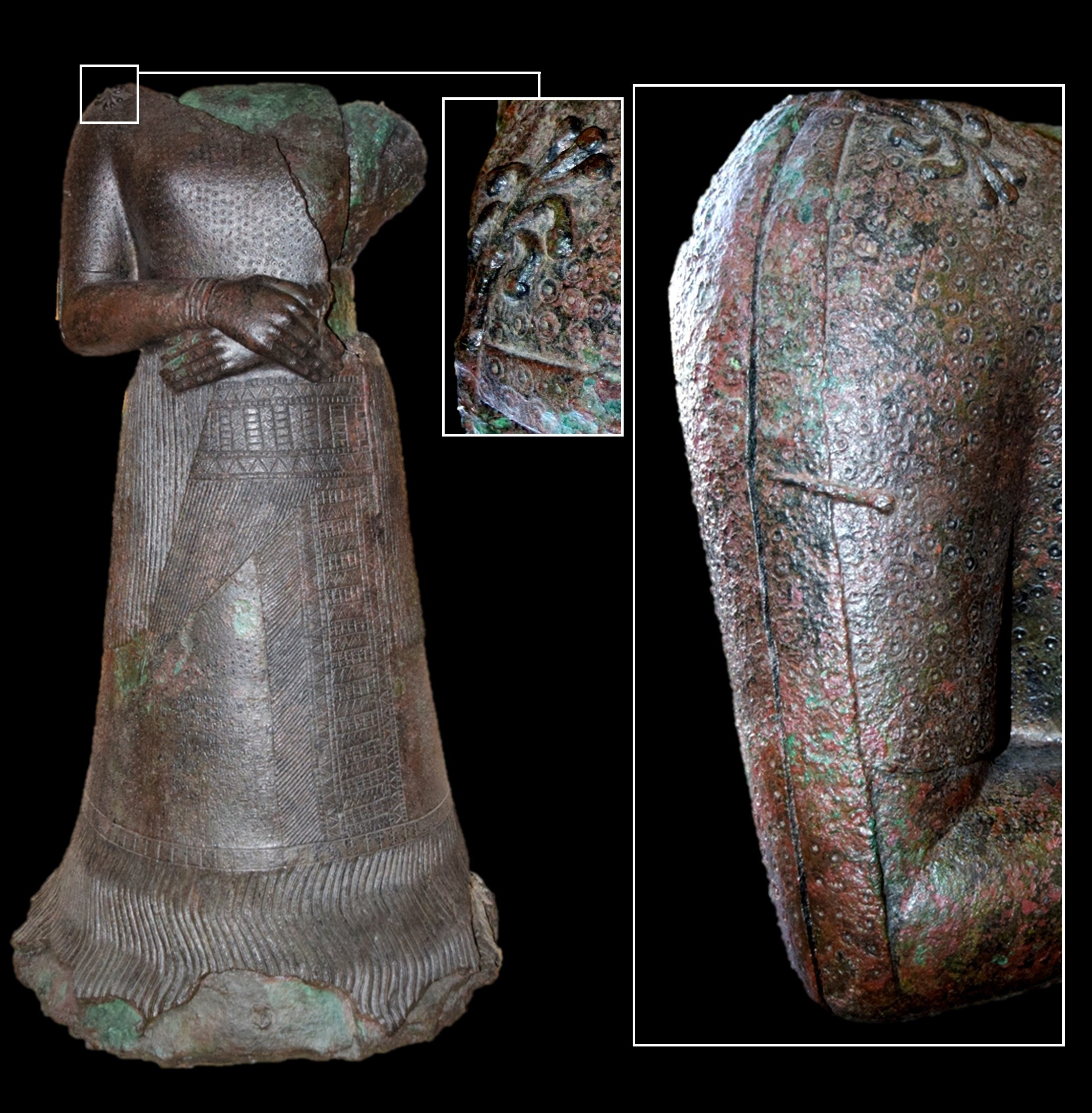
Details of Clasps (by J. Alvarez-Mon)

== Description ==
The statue is missing its head and part of the copper shell from the upper left side of the body. It depicts the queen standing with her hands held before her waist, the right placed over the left, a gesture of piety apparently introduced at this time.

The fingers are exceptionally long and carefully rendered, with nails and skin folds at the knuckles clearly marked. On her left ring finger, she wears a thick band decorated with a raised pattern, and each wrist bears four bracelets.

The blouse of Napir-Asu’s garment is decorated with hundreds of circles, each marked by a central dot. These may represent embroidered motifs or metallic disks, though it is equally possible that actual appliqués of precious metal were once fixed over them. The treatment of the sleeves on the preserved right arm is difficult to interpret. At the front, the sleeve ends just above the elbow, while at the back the fabric extends down over the tip of the elbow. The two sections are joined midway along the upper arm by a simple clasp, and at the shoulder by another clasp in the form of a sacred tree with four drooping branches ending in buds and three more rising from the top. If this is not an unusual sleeve style, it may indicate that the longer piece of fabric covering the elbow belonged to a shawl with similar decoration, resembling the pinned capes that cover the shoulders of contemporary terracotta female figurines. Yet there is no indication of a loose shawl falling behind the garment.

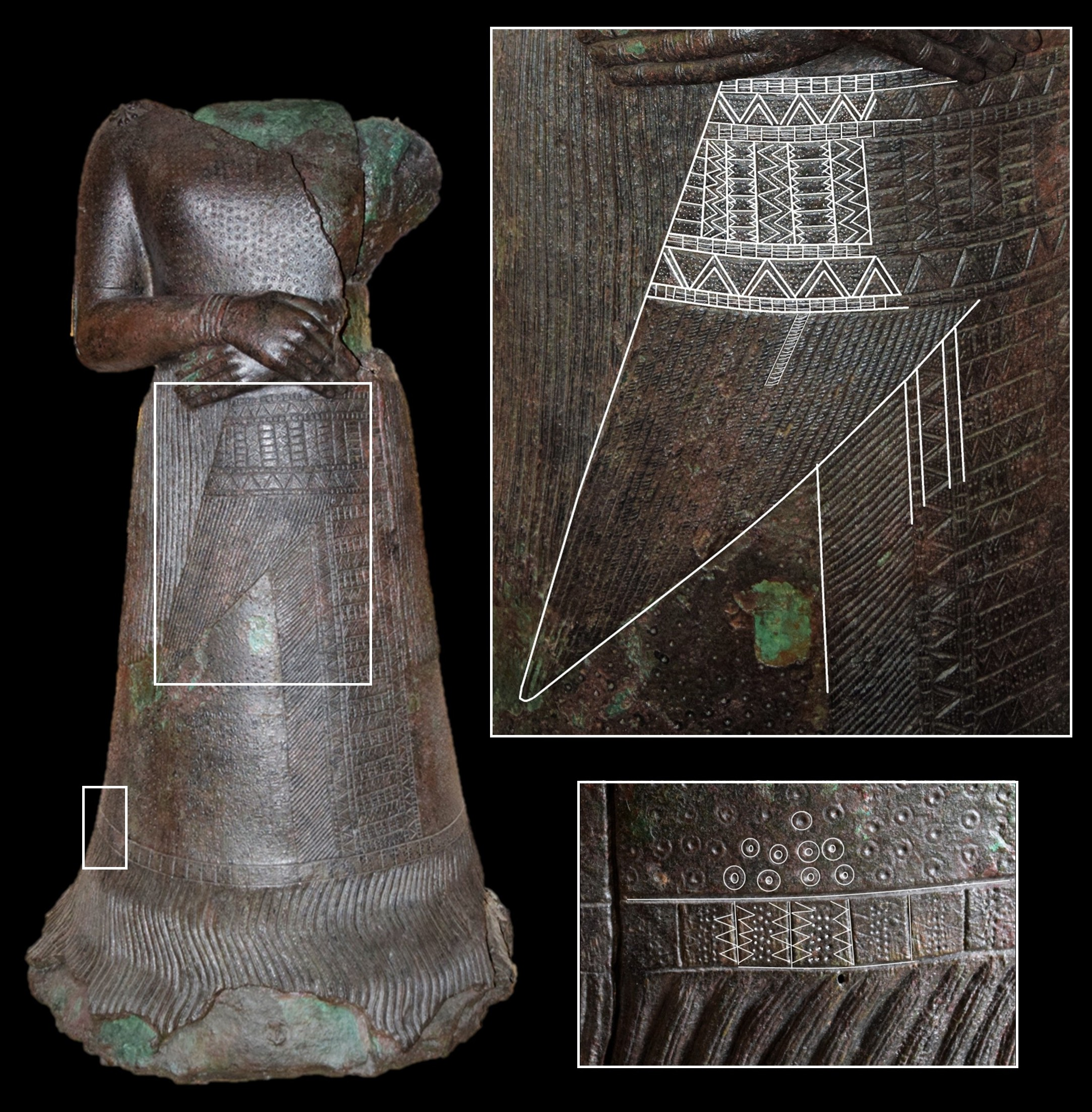

The sumptuous long, bell-shaped skirt, when viewed from behind, is composed of five distinct layers:

1. A waistband divided into vertical compartments, the resulting rectangular panels filled with dots and triangles (or, seen sideways, vertically bisected diamonds).
2. A dense, luxuriant fleece descending from the waistband to the knees.
3. A fabric layer covered with the same tiny dotted disks that adorn the blouse.
4. A horizontal band ornamented in the same way as the waistband.
5. A long, wavy fringe encircling the hem.

The decoration of the front of the skirt is far more elaborate. At its center hangs a large, asymmetrical fringe of twisted threads, suspended from a broad panel filled with an intricate arrangement of crosshatches, double zigzags, dots, and triangles. Below it extends a second panel, bordered by a shorter vertical fringe and decorated in a similar manner. These complex geometric designs may represent embroideries that further emphasized the luxury of the queen’s attire. The rest of the front of the skirt continues the motifs of the back, with the layered sequence of dotted disks, embroidered bands, and fringes.

Other garments of the late 14th century BC Elamite royal wardrobe confirm the distinctive ornamental style visible on Napir-Asu’s statue. The same combination of embroidered bands, heavy fringes, and fields of disks—either plain, centrally dotted, or ringed—appears on the second female figure of Untash-Napirisha’s stele, on the lower half of the king’s own stone statue, and on the small faience statuette from Chogha Zanbil. Taken together, these examples suggest a unified royal dress code, one that may provide the earliest evidence for garments adorned with bracteates. In the same spirit of uniformity, we also note the repeated occurrence of the gesture of piety: the right hand placed over the left at the waist, whenever the hands are preserved.

This life-size sculpture of the Elamite queen must originally have stood over 1.50 m tall, including the now-missing head and neck. These sections, together with part of the left shoulder and arm, were violently removed in circumstances that remain uncertain, although the invading Assyrian troops of Ashurbanipal in 647 BC are often named as the likely culprits.

Another near-disastrous episode in the statue’s history is recounted by Lampre. While being loaded onto a boat moored on the Karun river for transport to France, the enormous weight of the sculpture caused the makeshift hoisting arrangement to collapse. “Napir-Asu rolled towards the river just to the edge of a deep pit,” from which she would have been irretrievable. Her rescue, even from the brink, was accomplished only with the greatest difficulty.

In the end, the statue reached the Louvre Museum, where, in Lampre’s words, “after so many vicissitudes, the statue of Queen Napir-Asu, piously placed under the protection of the gods, has won safe haven in our National Museum, where it is exposed to the admiration of scholars and artists.” Today this ancient metal sculpture still stands in the museum’s galleries as an emblem of Elam’s “golden age.”

The statue is held in the Louvre collections. In 1993 the statue, alongside other works from the Louvre, was loaned to the Metropolitan Museum of Art for exhibition. It is recognised as a masterpiece of Elamite art.
