= Elam =

Ancient pre-Iranian civilization between 3200 and 539 BC

Elam Haltamti 𒁹𒄬𒆷𒁶𒋾 3200–539 BC
- Map showing the area of the Elamite Empire (in orange) and the neighboring areas. The approximate Bronze Age extension of the Persian Gulf is shown.
- Alternative names: Elamites, Susiana
- Geographical range: Iran; 29°54′N 52°24′E and Iraq
- Period: Pre-Iranic
- Dates: 3200–539 BC
- Preceded by: Proto-Elamite, Kassite dynasty
- Followed by: Achaemenid Empire

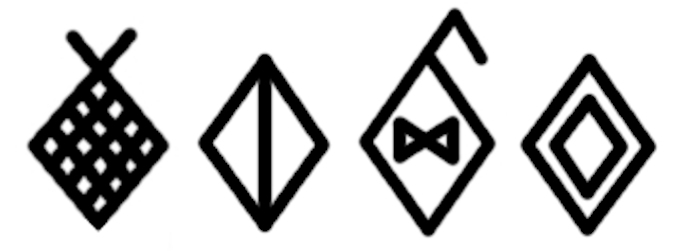
Elam (/ˈiːləm/) (Note: Linear Elamite: hatamti; Cuneiform Elamite: 𒁹𒄬𒆷𒁶𒋾 ḫalatamti; Sumerian: 𒉏𒈠 elam; Akkadian: 𒉏𒈠𒆠 elamtu; Hebrew: עֵילָם ʿēlām; Old Persian: 𐎢𐎺𐎩 hūja)) was an ancient civilization centered in the far west and southwest of Iran, stretching from the lowlands of Ilam and Khuzestan as well as a small part of modern-day southern Iraq. The modern name Elam stems from the Sumerian transliteration elam(a), along with the later Akkadian elamtu, and the Elamite haltamti. Elamite states were among the leading political forces of the Ancient Near East. In classical literature, Elam was also known as Susiana (US: /ˌsuːʒiˈænə/ UK: /ˌsuːziˈɑːnə/; Ancient Greek: Σουσιανή Sousiānḗ), a name derived from its capital Susa.

Elam was part of the early urbanization of the Near East during the Chalcolithic period (Copper Age). The emergence of written records from around 3000 BC also parallels Sumerian history, where slightly earlier records have been found. In the Old Elamite period (Middle Bronze Age), Elam consisted of kingdoms on the Iranian plateau, centered in Anshan, and from the mid-2nd millennium BC, it was centered in Susa in the Khuzestan lowlands. The Elamites played an important role in the development of Iranian civilization. Their administrative traditions and organized government were an important foundation of the Iranian administrative system.

== Etymology ==
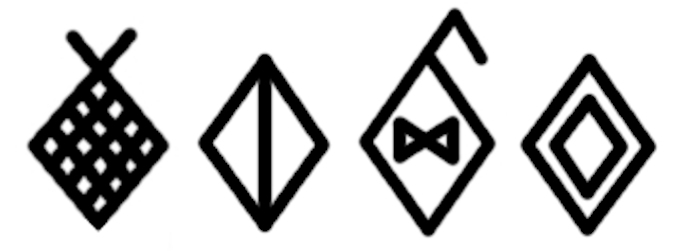
The Elamite language endonym for Elam as a country appears to have been Hatamti ( in Linear Elamite), or Haltamti (Cuneiform Elamite: 𒁹𒄬𒆷𒁶𒋾 halatamti).

Exonyms included the Sumerian names ELAM.MA^{ki}𒉏𒈠𒆠 and ELAM, the Akkadian Elamû (masculine/neuter) and Elamītu (feminine) meant "resident of Susiana, Elamite". The Sumerian term elam also referred to the highlands.

In prehistory, Elam was centered primarily in modern Khuzestān and Ilam. The name Khuzestān is derived ultimately from Old Persian: 𐎢𐎺𐎩 (hūja) meaning Susa/Elam. This became Middle Persian: 𐭧𐭥𐭰 (hūz) "Susiana", and in modern Persian: خوز (xuz), compounded with the toponymic suffix -stån "place".

== Geography ==
Timeline of Elam.

In geographical terms, Susiana basically represents the Iranian province of Khuzestan around the river Karun. In ancient times, several names were used to describe this area. The ancient geographer Ptolemy was the earliest to call the area Susiana, referring to the country around Susa.

Another ancient geographer, Strabo, viewed Elam and Susiana as two different geographic regions. He referred to Elam ("land of the Elymaei") as primarily the highland area of Khuzestan.

Disagreements over the location also exist in the Jewish historical sources says Daniel T. Potts. Some ancient sources draw a distinction between Elam as the highland area of Khuzestan, and Susiana as the lowland area. Yet in other ancient sources 'Elam' and 'Susiana' seem equivalent.

The uncertainty in this area extends also to modern scholarship. Since the discovery of ancient Anshan, and the realization of its great importance in Elamite history, the definitions were changed again. Some modern scholars argued that the center of Elam lay at Anshan and in the highlands around it, and not at Susa in lowland Khuzistan.

Potts disagrees suggesting that the term 'Elam' was primarily constructed by the Mesopotamians to describe the area in general terms, without referring specifically either to the lowlanders or the highlanders,

Elam is not an Iranian term and has no relationship to the conception which the peoples of highland Iran had of themselves. They were Anshanites, Marhashians, Shimashkians, Zabshalians, Sherihumians, Awanites, etc. That Anshan played a leading role in the political affairs of the various highland groups inhabiting southwestern Iran is clear. But to argue that Anshan is coterminous with Elam is to misunderstand the artificiality and indeed the alienness of Elam as a construct imposed from without on the peoples of the southwestern highlands of the Zagros mountain range, the coast of Fars and the alluvial plain drained by the Karun-Karkheh river system.

== History ==
Prehistorically the area was well settled during the Ubaid period and shared many aspects of Ubaid cultures.

Knowledge of Elamite history remains largely fragmentary, reconstruction being based on mainly Mesopotamian (Sumerian, Akkadian, Assyrian, and Babylonian) sources. The history of Elam is conventionally divided into three periods, spanning more than two millennia. The period before the first Elamite period is known as the proto-Elamite period:

- Proto-Elamite period: c. 3200 – c. 2700 BC (Proto-Elamite script in Susa)
- Old Elamite period: c. 2700 – c. 1500 BC (earliest documents until the Sukkalmah Dynasty)
- Middle Elamite period: c. 1500 – c. 1100 BC (Anzanite dynasty until the Babylonian invasion of Susa)
- Neo-Elamite period: c. 1100 – 540 BC (characterized by Assyrian and Median influence. 539 BC marks the beginning of the Achaemenid period.)

=== Proto-Elamite (c. 3200 – c. 2700 BC) ===
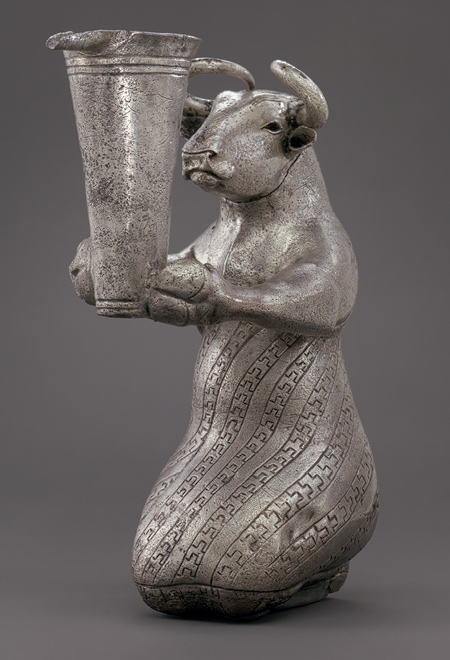
Kneeling Bull with Vessel. Kneeling bull holding a spouted vessel, Proto-Elamite period, (3100–2900 BC)

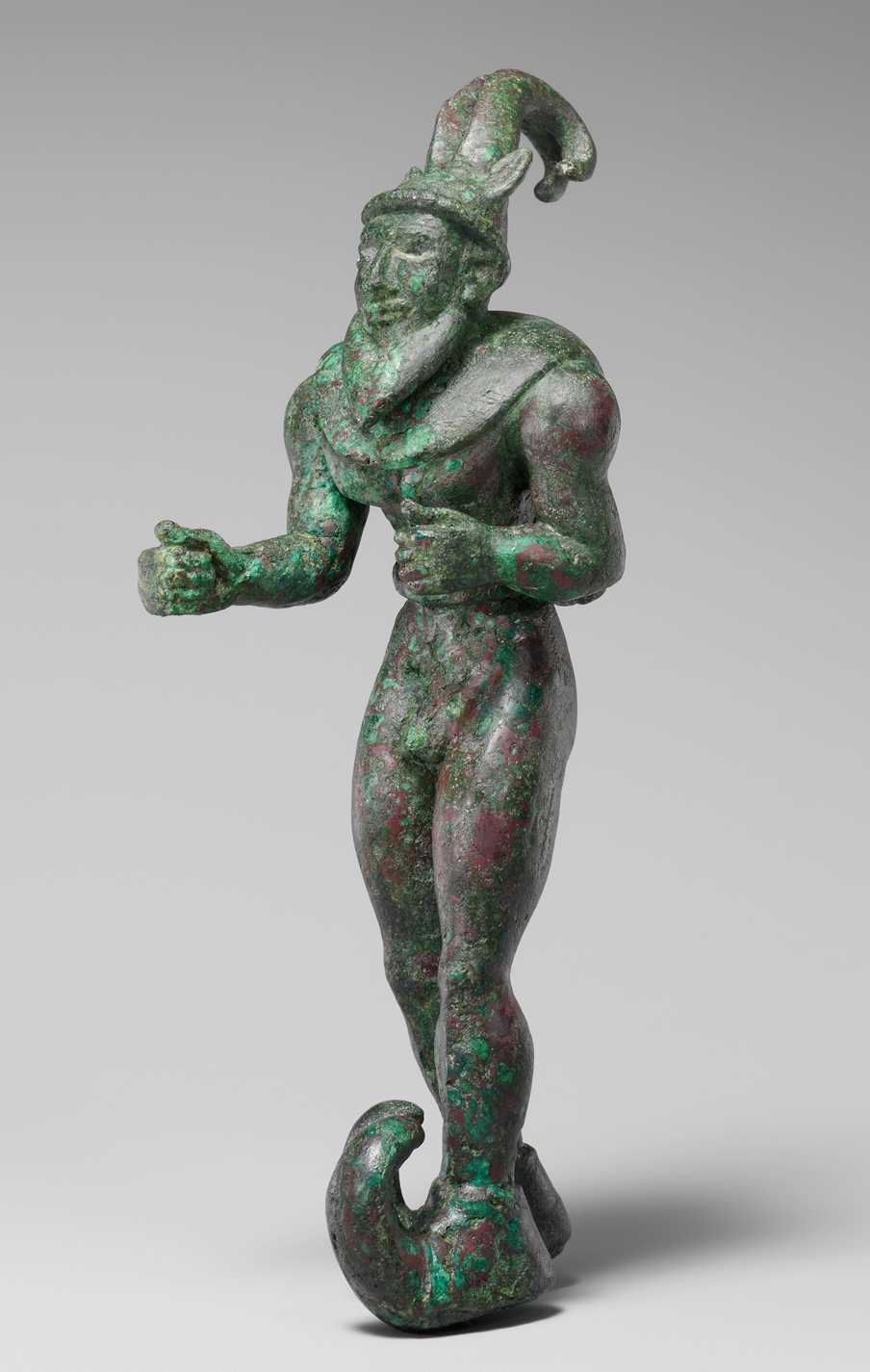
Striding figure with ibex horns, c. 3000 BC

Proto-Elamite civilization grew up east of the Tigris and Euphrates alluvial plains; it was a combination of the lowlands and the immediate highland areas to the north and east. At least three proto-Elamite states merged to form Elam: Anshan, Awan, and Shimashki. References to Awan are generally older than those to Anshan, and some scholars suggest that both states encompassed the same territory, in different eras (see Hanson, Encyclopædia Iranica). To this core Shushiana was periodically annexed and broken off. In addition, some Proto-Elamite sites are found well outside this area, spread out on the Iranian plateau; such as Warakshe, Sialk (now a suburb of the modern city of Kashan) and Jiroft in Kerman Province. The state of Elam was formed from these lesser states as a response to invasion from Sumer during the Old Elamite period. Elamite strength was based on an ability to hold these various areas together under a coordinated government that permitted the maximum interchange of the natural resources unique to each region. Traditionally, this was done through a federated governmental structure.

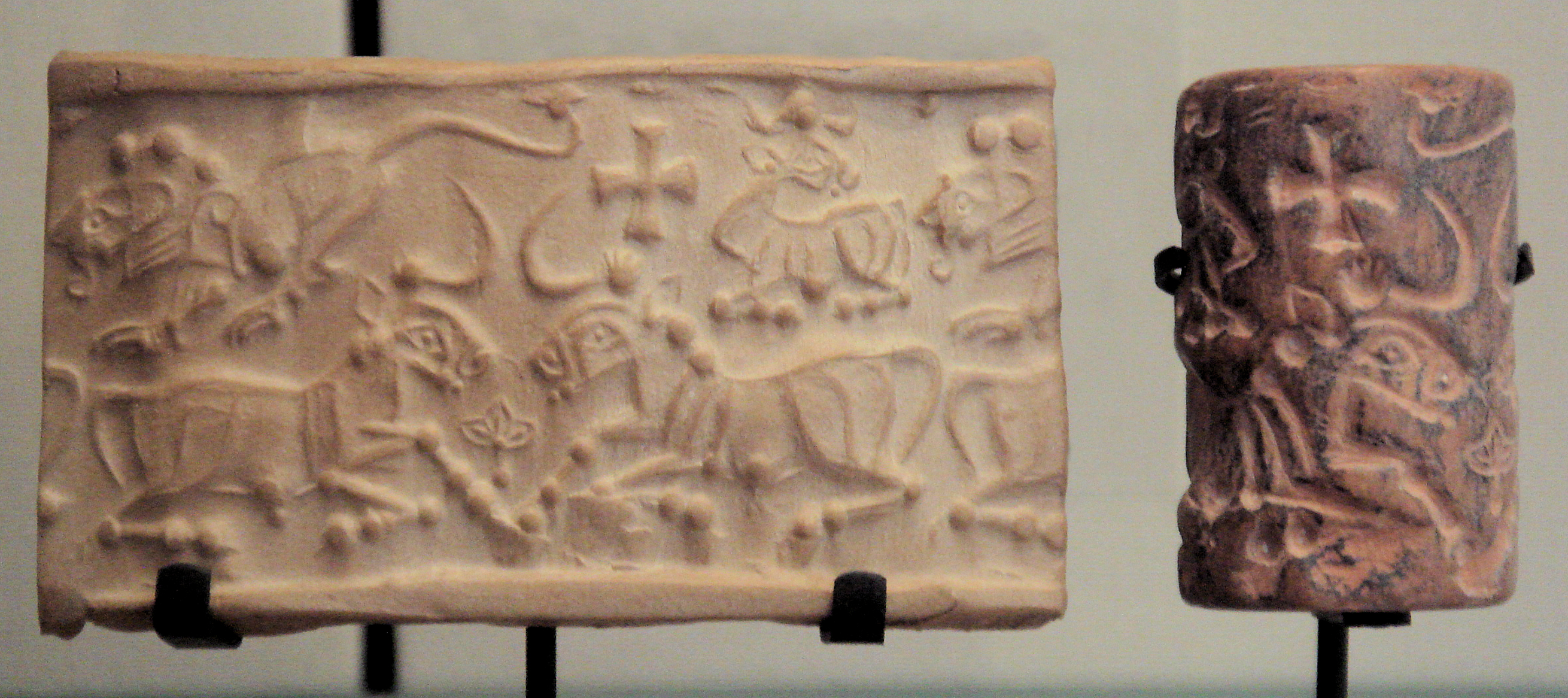
Proto-Elamite (Susa III) cylinder seal, 3150–2800 BC.

The Proto-Elamite city of Susa was founded around 4000 BC in the watershed of the river Karun. It is considered to be the site of Proto-Elamite cultural formation. During its early history, it fluctuated between submission to Mesopotamian and Elamite power. The earliest levels (22–17 in the excavations conducted by Le Brun, 1978) exhibit pottery that has no equivalent in Mesopotamia, but for the succeeding period, the excavated material allows identification with the culture of Sumer of the Uruk period. Proto-Elamite influence from Mesopotamia in Susa becomes visible from about 3200 BC, and texts in the still undeciphered Proto-Elamite writing system continue to be present until about 2700 BC. The Proto-Elamite period ends with the establishment of the Awan dynasty. The earliest known historical figure connected with Elam is the king Enmebaragesi of Kish (c. 2650 BC?), who subdued it, according to the Sumerian king list. Elamite history can only be traced from records dating to beginning of the Akkadian Empire (2335–2154 BC) onwards.

The Proto-Elamite states in Jiroft and Zabol (not universally accepted), present a special case because of their great antiquity.

In ancient Luristan, bronze-making tradition goes back to the mid-3rd millennium BC, and has many Elamite connections. Bronze objects from several cemeteries in the region date to the Early Dynastic Period (Mesopotamia) I, and to Ur-III period c. 2900–2000 BC. These excavations include Kalleh Nisar, Bani Surmah, Chigha Sabz, Kamtarlan, Sardant, and Gulal-i Galbi.

=== Old Elamite period (c. 2700 – c. 1500 BC) ===
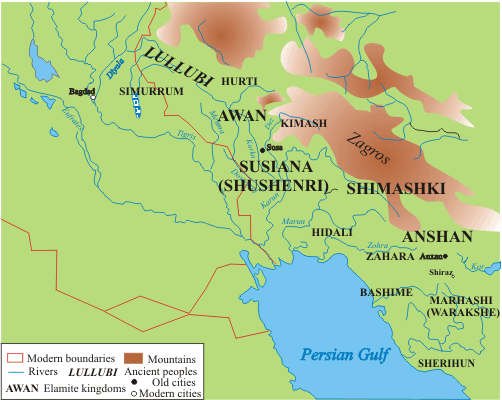
Polities during the Old Elamite period, and northern tribes of the Lullubi, Simurrum and Hurti.

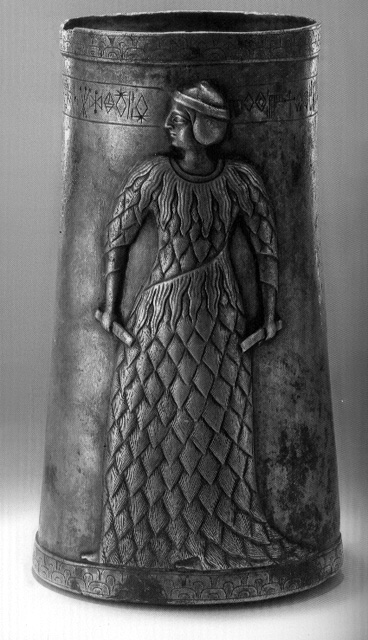
Silver cup with linear-Elamite inscription on it. Late 3rd millennium BC. National Museum of Iran.

The Old Elamite period began around 2700 BC. Historical records mention the conquest of Elam by Enmebaragesi, the Sumerian king of Kish in Mesopotamia. Three dynasties ruled during this period. Twelve kings of each of the first two dynasties, those of Awan (or Avan; c. 2400 – c. 2100 BC) and Simashki (c. 2100 – c. 1970 BC), are known from a list from Susa dating to the Old Babylonian period. Two Elamite dynasties said to have exercised brief control over parts of Sumer in very early times include Awan and Hamazi; and likewise, several of the stronger Sumerian rulers, such as Eannatum of Lagash and Lugal-anne-mundu of Adab, are recorded as temporarily dominating Elam.

==== Awan dynasty ====
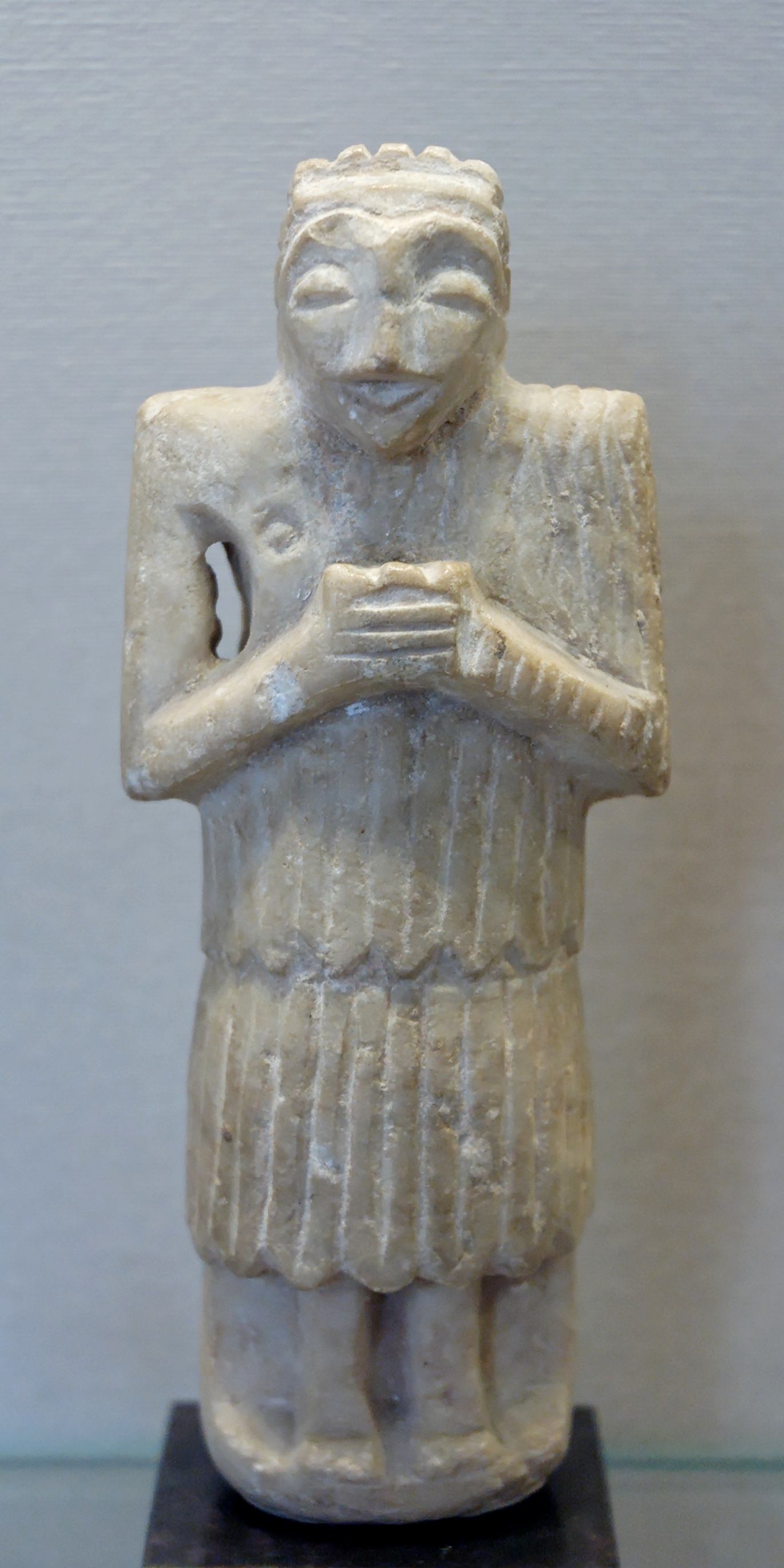
Orant figure, Susa IV, 2700–2340 BC.

The Awan dynasty (2350–2150 BC) was partly contemporary with that of the Mesopotamian emperor Sargon of Akkad, who not only defeated the Awan king Luh-ishan and subjected Susa, but attempted to make the East Semitic Akkadian the official language there. From this time, Mesopotamian sources concerning Elam become more frequent, since the Mesopotamians had developed an interest in resources (such as wood, stone, and metal) from the Iranian plateau, and military expeditions to the area became more common. With the collapse of Akkad under Sargon's great-great-grandson, Shar-kali-sharri, Elam declared independence under the last Awan king, Kutik-Inshushinak (c. 2240 – c. 2220 BC), and threw off the Akkadian language, promoting in its place the brief Linear Elamite script. Kutik-Inshushinnak conquered Susa and Anshan, and seems to have achieved some sort of political unity. Following his reign, the Awan dynasty collapsed as Elam was temporarily overrun by the Guti, another pre-Iranic people from what is now north west Iran who also spoke a language isolate.

==== Shimashki dynasty ====
About a century later, the Sumerian king Shulgi of the Neo-Sumerian Empire retook the city of Susa and the surrounding region. During the first part of the rule of the Simashki dynasty, Elam was under intermittent attack from the Sumerians of Mesopotamia and also Gutians from northwestern Iran, alternating with periods of peace and diplomatic approaches. The Elamite state of Simashki at this time also extended into northern Iran, and possibly even as far as the Caspian Sea. Shu-Sin of Ur gave one of his daughters in marriage to a prince of Anshan. But the power of the Sumerians was waning; Ibbi-Sin in the 21st century did not manage to penetrate far into Elam, and in 2004 BC, the Elamites, allied with the people of Susa and led by king Kindattu, the sixth king of Simashki, managed to sack Ur and lead Ibbi-Sin into captivity, ending the third dynasty of Ur. The Akkadian kings of Isin, successor state to Ur, managed to drive the Elamites out of Ur, rebuild the city, and to return the statue of Nanna that the Elamites had plundered.

==== Sukkalmah dynasty ====
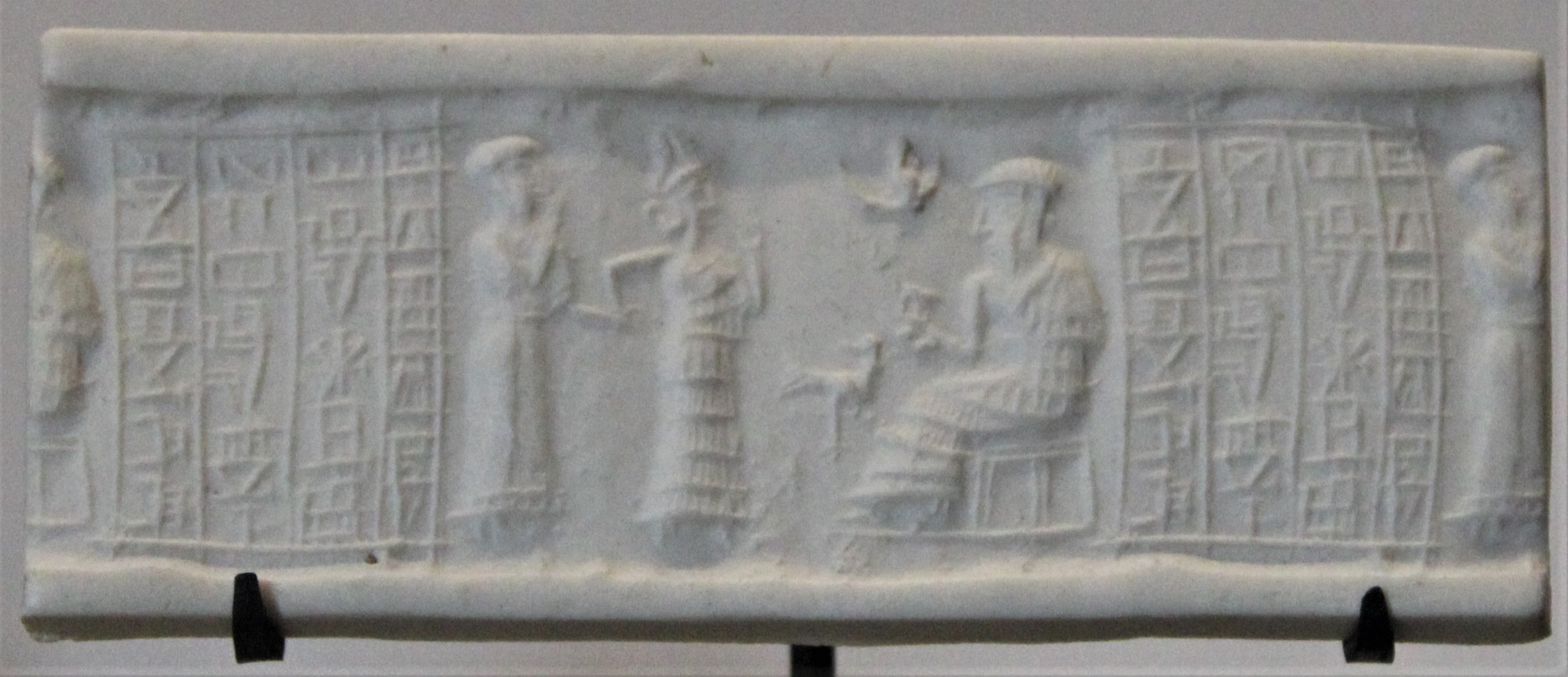
Seal impression of King Ebarat (𒂊𒁀𒊏𒀜), founder of the Sukkalmah Dynasty (also called Epartid Dynasty after his name). Louvre Museum, reference Sb 6225. King Ebarat appears enthroned. The inscription reads "Ebarat the King. Kuk Kalla, son of Kuk-Sharum, servant of Shilhaha".

The succeeding dynasty, often called the Sukkalmah dynasty (c. 1970 – c. 1770 BC) after "Great regents", the title borne by its members, also called the Epartid dynasty after the name of its founder Ebarat/ Eparti, was roughly contemporary with the Amorite Kingdom of Upper Mesopotamia, and Amorite Old Babylonian period in Mesopotamia, being younger by approximately sixty years than the Kingdom of Upper Mesopotamia in Upper Mesopotamia, and almost seventy-five years older than the Old Babylonian Empire. This period is said by many to be confusing and difficult to reconstruct. It was apparently founded by Eparti I. During this time, Susa was under Elamite control, but Akkadian-speaking Mesopotamian states such as Larsa and Isin continually tried to retake the city. Around 1850 BC Kudur-Mabuk, apparently king of another Akkadian state to the north of Larsa, managed to install his son, Warad-Sin, on the throne of Larsa, and Warad-Sin's brother, Rim-Sin, succeeded him and conquered much of southern Mesopotamia for Larsa.

Notable Eparti dynasty rulers in Elam during this time include Shirukduh (c. 1850 BC), who entered various military coalitions to contain the power of the south Mesopotamian states. Siruk-tuh was the king of Elam when Hammurabi first ruled, he and later kings of the Elamite dynasty were referred to as "great king" and "father" by kings in Syria and Mesopotamia and were the only kings that the Mesopotamian Kings considered to be higher in status than themselves. Siwe-Palar-Khuppak, who for some time was the most powerful person in the area, respectfully addressed as "Father" by Mesopotamian kings such as Zimrilim of Mari, Shamshi-Adad I of the Kingdom of Upper Mesopotamia, and even Hammurabi of Babylon. During his reign alone, Elam interfered extensively with Mesopotamian politics, allowing messengers and envoys to travel far west to Emar and Qatna in Syria. His messenger reached Emar and sent his three servants to King Amut-piʾel II of Qatna (1772–1762 BC), and the king of Qatna also sent two messengers to Elam. The Elamite rulers had become increasingly involved in Mesopotamian politics during the Sukkalmah dynasty. In fact, Rim-Sin of Larsa himself was of Elamite descent, notwithstanding his Akkadian name. Kudur-Nahhunte, who plundered the temples of southern Mesopotamia, the north being under the control of the Old Assyrian Empire. But Elamite influence in southern Mesopotamia did not last. Around 1760 BC, Hammurabi drove out the Elamites, overthrew Rim-Sin of Larsa, and established a short lived Babylonian Empire in Mesopotamia. Little is known about the latter part of this dynasty, since sources again become sparse with the Kassite rule of Babylon (from c. 1595 BC).

=== Trade with the Indus Valley Civilization ===
Many archaeological finds suggest that maritime trade along the shores of Africa and Asia started several millennia ago. Trade between the Indus Valley Civilization and the cities of Mesopotamia and Elam can be inferred from numerous find of Indus artifacts, particularly in the excavation at Susa. Various objects made with shell species that are characteristic of the Indus coast, particularly Trubinella pyrum and Fasciolaria trapezium, have been found in the archaeological sites of Mesopotamia and Susa dating from around 2500–2000 BC. Carnelian beads from the Indus were found in Susa in the excavation of the tell of the citadel. In particular, carnelian beads with an etched design in white were probably imported from the Indus Valley, and made according to a technique of acid-etching developed by the Harappans.

Exchanges seem to have waned after 1900 BC, together with the disappearance of the Indus valley Civilization.

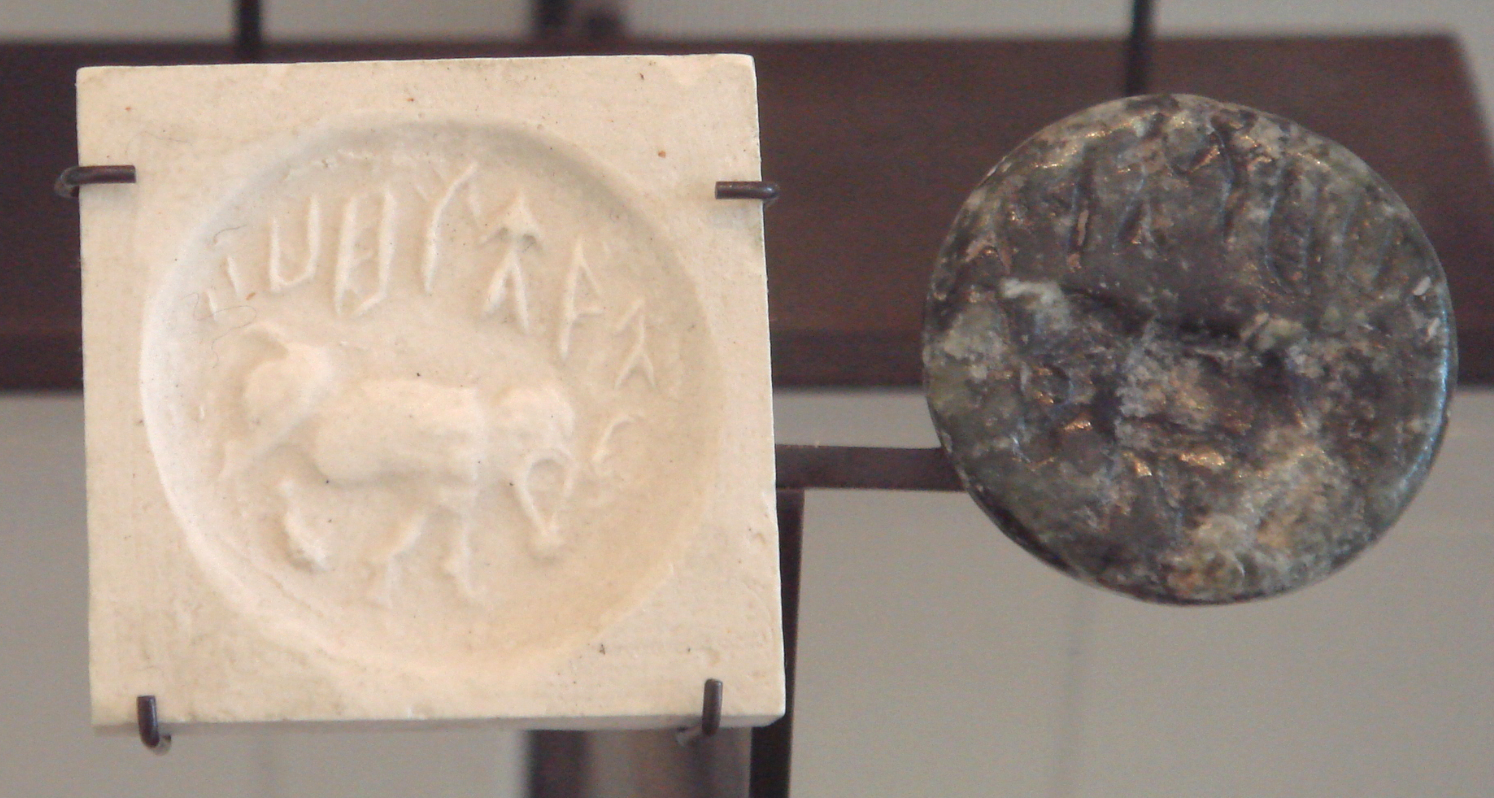
Indus round seal with impression. Elongated buffalo with Harappan symbol imported to Susa in 2600–1700 BC. Found in the tell of the Susa acropolis. Louvre Museum, reference Sb 5614

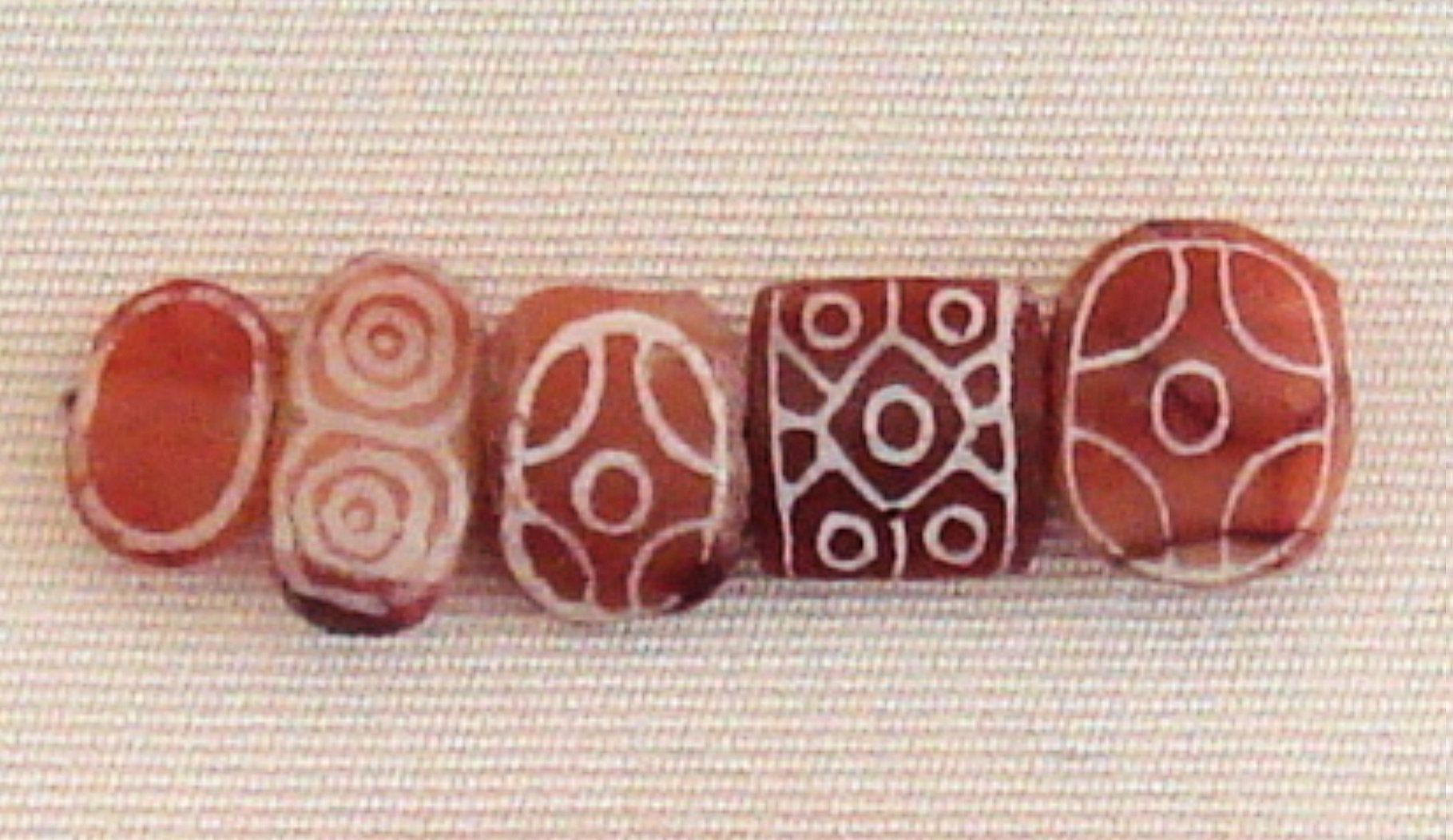
Indus carnelian beads with white design, etched in white with an acid, imported to Susa in 2600–1700 BC. Found in the tell of the Susa acropolis. Louvre Museum, reference Sb 17751. These beads are identical with beads found in the Indus Civilization site of Dholavira.

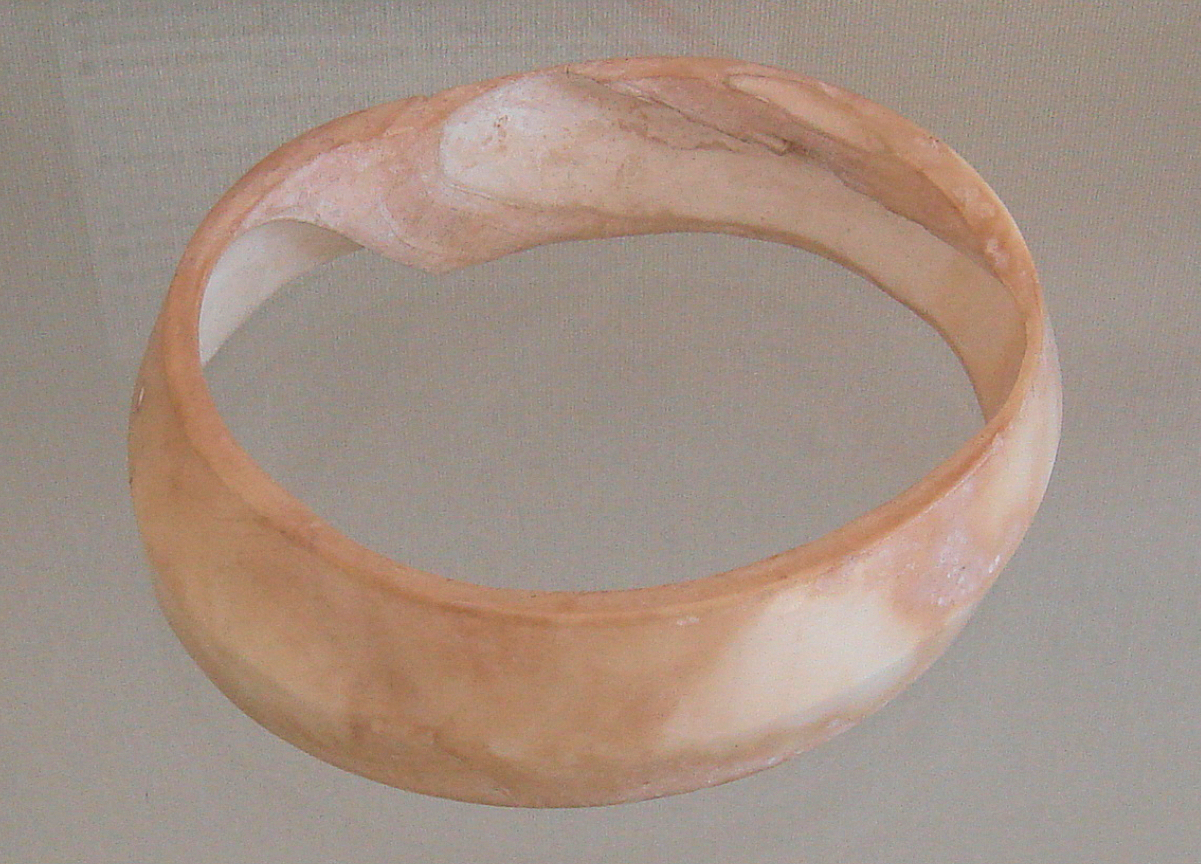
Indus bracelet made of Fasciolaria trapezium or Turbinella pyrum imported to Susa in 2600–1700 BC. Found in the tell of the Susa acropolis. Louvre Museum, reference Sb 14473. This type of bracelet was manufactured in Mohenjo-daro, Lothal and Balakot. It is engraved with a chevron design which is characteristic of all shell bangles of the Indus Valley, visible here.

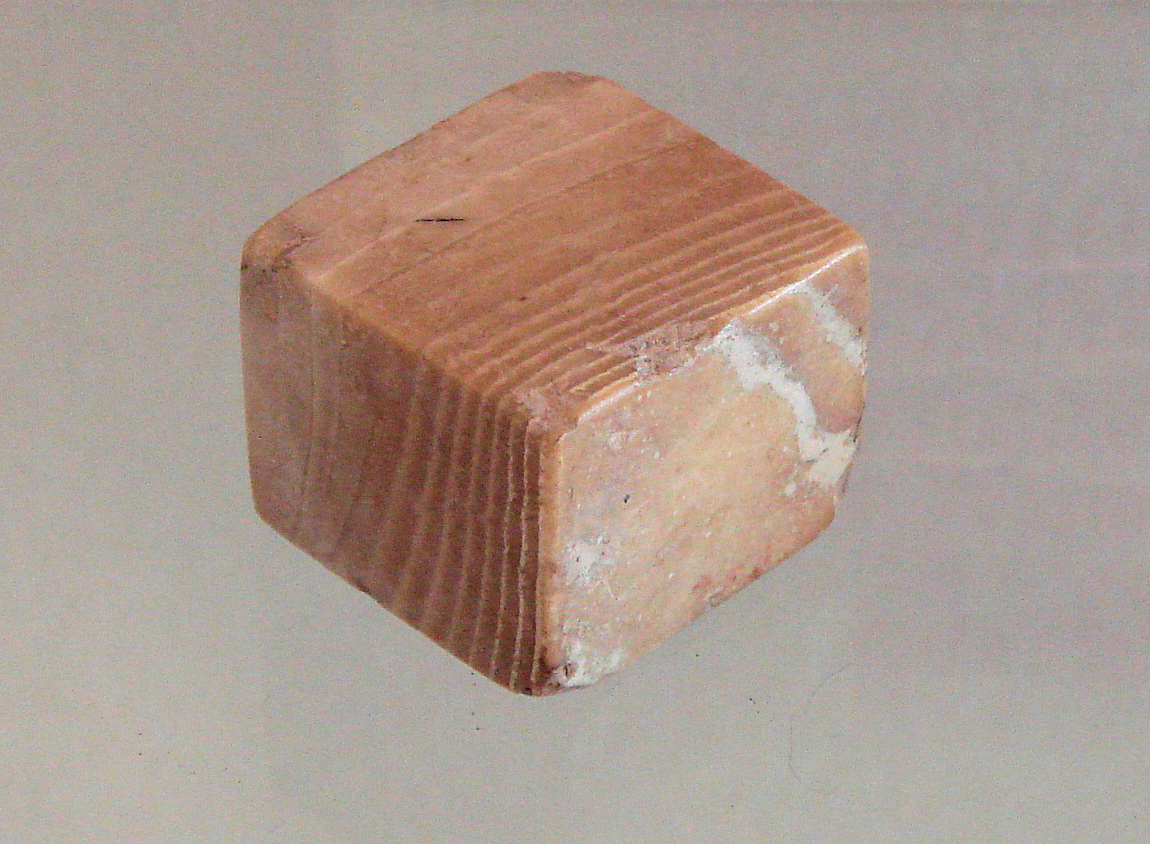
Indus Valley Civilization weight in veined jasper, excavated in Susa in a 12th-century BC princely tomb. Louvre Museum Sb 17774.

=== Middle Elamite period (c. 1500 – c. 1100 BC) ===
==== Anshan and Susa ====
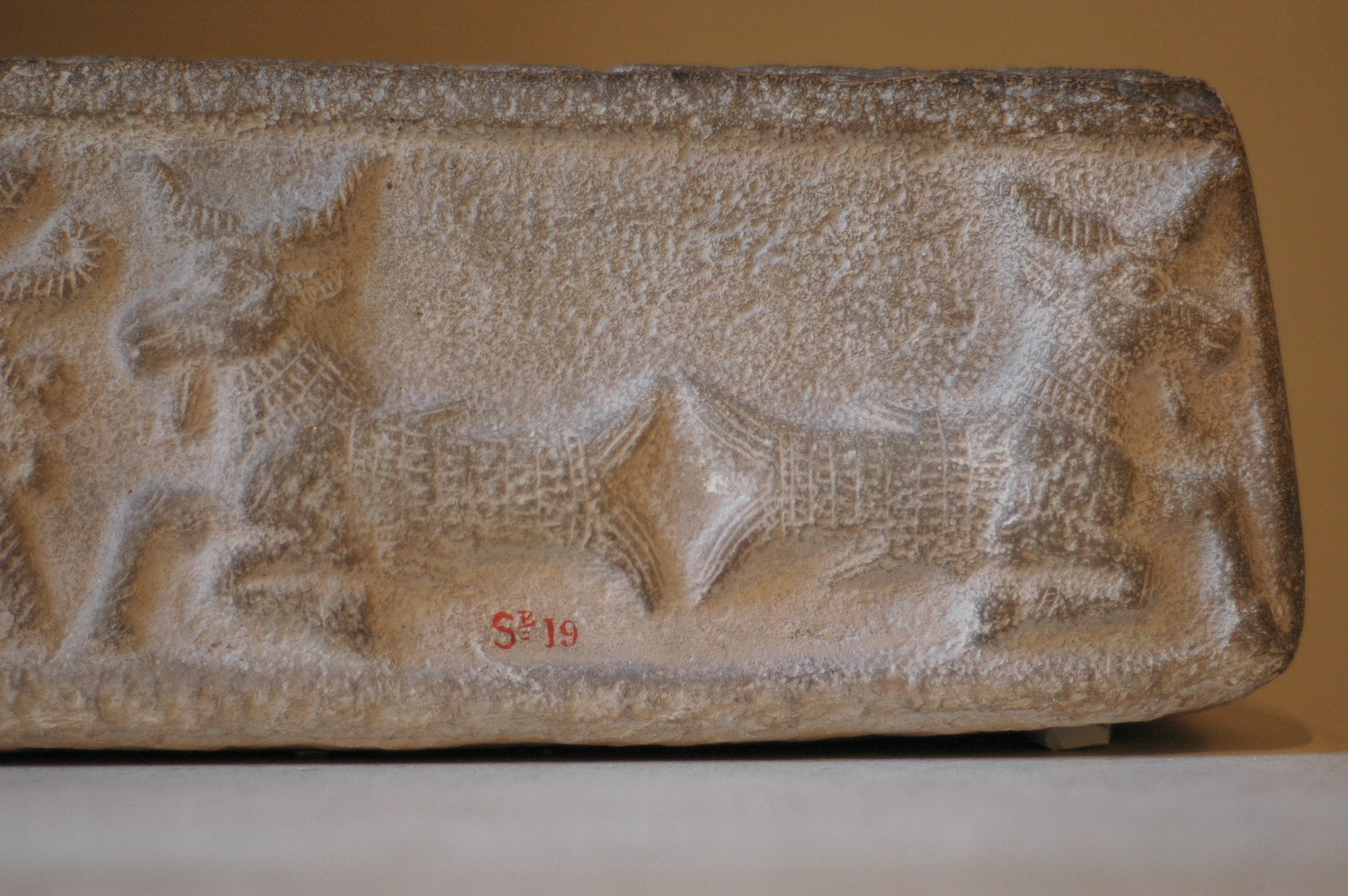
An ornate design on this limestone ritual vat from the Middle Elamite period depicts creatures with the heads of goats and the tails of fish (1500–1110 BC).

The Middle Elamite period began with the rise of the Anshanite dynasties around 1500 BC. Their rule was characterized by an "Elamisation" of Susa, and the kings took the title "king of Anshan and Susa". While the first of these dynasties, the Kidinuids continued to use the Akkadian language frequently in their inscriptions, the succeeding Igihalkids and Shutrukids used Elamite with increasing regularity. Likewise, Elamite language and culture grew in importance in Susiana. The Kidinuids (c. 1500 – 1400 BC) are a group of five rulers of uncertain affiliation. They are identified by their use of the older title, "king of Susa and of Anshan", and by calling themselves "servant of Kirwashir", an Elamite deity, thereby introducing the pantheon of the highlands to Susiana. The city of Susa itself is one of the oldest in the world dating back to around 4200 BC. Since its founding Susa was known as a central power location for the Elamites and for later Persian dynasties. Susa's power would peak during the Middle Elamite period, when it would be the region's capital.

==== Kassite invasions ====
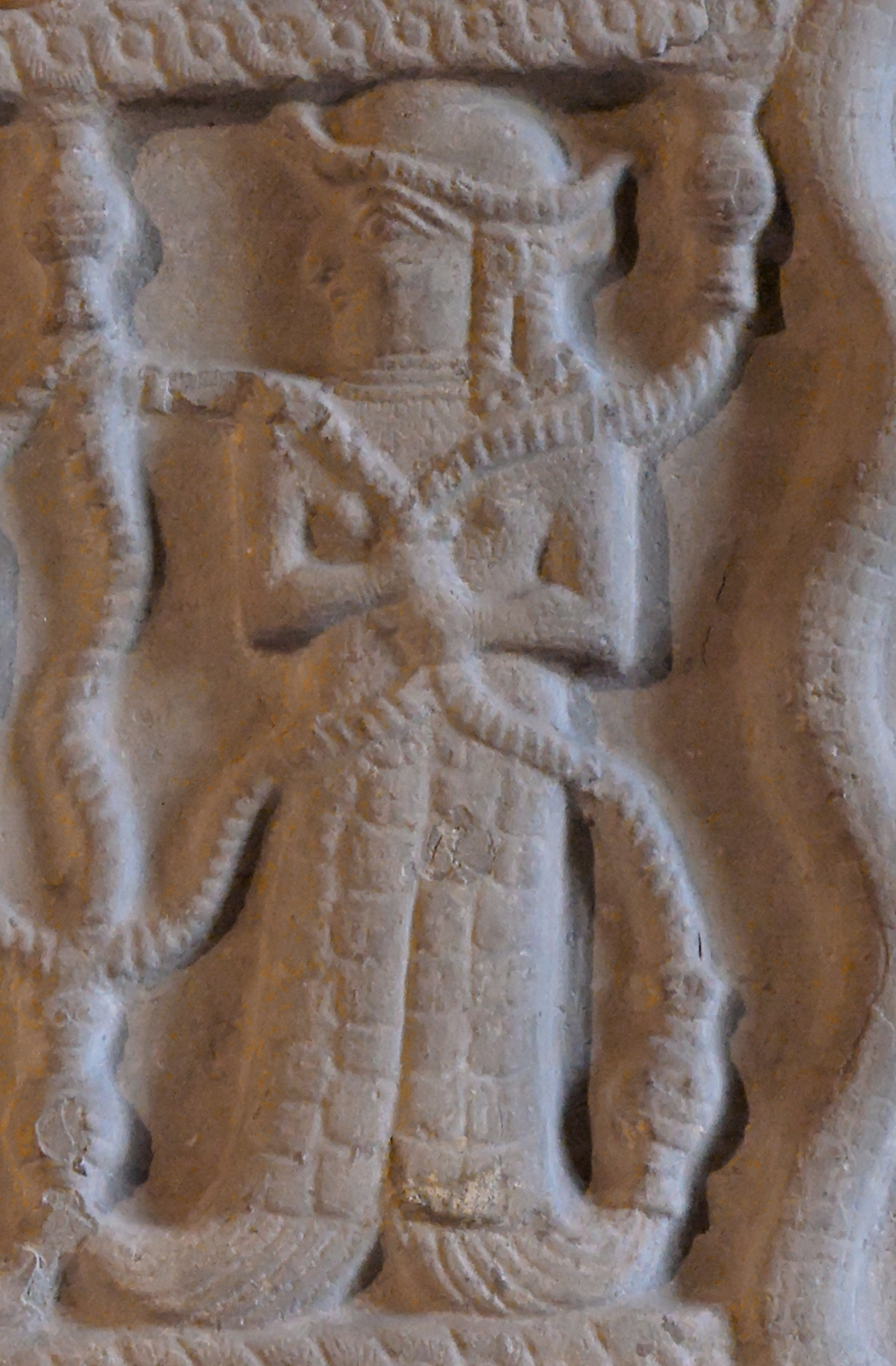
Stele of Untash Napirisha, king of Anshan and Susa. Sandstone, c. 1340–1300 BC.

Of the Igehalkids (c. 1400 – 1210 BC), ten rulers are known, though their number was possibly larger. Some of them married Kassite princesses. The Kassites were also a language isolate speaking people from the Zagros Mountains who had taken Babylonia shortly after its sacking by the Hittite Empire in 1595 BC. The Kassite king of Babylon Kurigalzu II who had been installed on the throne by Ashur-uballit I of the Middle Assyrian Empire (1366–1020 BC), temporarily occupied Elam around 1320 BC, and later (c. 1230 BC) another Kassite king, Kashtiliash IV, fought Elam unsuccessfully. Kassite-Babylonian power waned, as they became dominated by the northern Mesopotamian Middle Assyrian Empire. Kiddin-Khutran of Elam repulsed the Kassites by defeating Enlil-nadin-shumi in 1224 BC and Adad-shuma-iddina around 1222–1217 BC. Under the Igehalkids, Akkadian inscriptions were rare, and Elamite highland gods became firmly established in Susa.

==== Elamite Empire ====
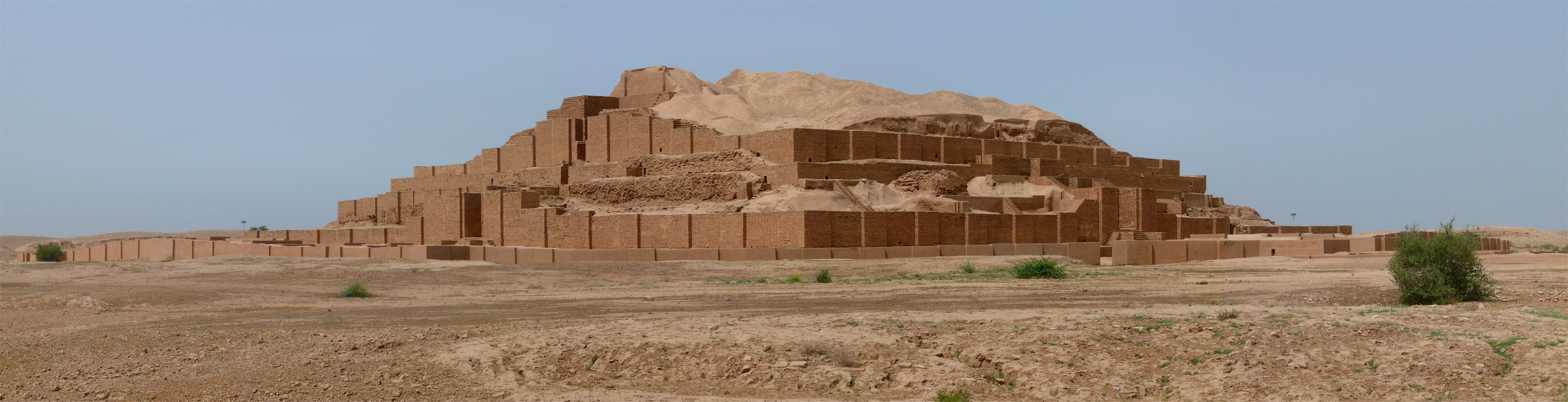
The Chogha Zanbil ziggurat site, built c. 1250 BC.

Under the Shutrukids (c. 1210 – 1100 BC), the Elamite empire reached the height of its power. Shutruk-Nakhkhunte and his three sons, Kutir-Nakhkhunte II, Shilhak-In-Shushinak, and Khutelutush-In-Shushinak were capable of frequent military campaigns into Kassite Babylonia (which was also being ravaged by the empire of Assyria during this period), and at the same time were exhibiting vigorous construction activity—building and restoring luxurious temples in Susa and across their Empire. Shutruk-Nakhkhunte raided Babylonia, carrying home to Susa trophies like the statues of Marduk and Manishtushu, the Manishtushu Obelisk, the Stele of Hammurabi and the stele of Naram-Sin. In 1158 BC, after much of Babylonia had been annexed by Ashur-Dan I of Assyria and Shutruk-Nakhkhunte, the Elamites defeated the Kassites permanently, killing the Kassite king of Babylon, Zababa-shuma-iddin, and replacing him with his eldest son, Kutir-Nakhkhunte, who held it no more than three years before being ejected by the native Akkadian-speaking Babylonians. The Elamites then briefly came into conflict with Assyria, managing to take the Assyrian city of Arrapḫa (modern Kirkuk) before being ultimately defeated and having a treaty forced upon them by Ashur-dan I.

Kutir-Nakhkhunte's son Khutelutush-In-Shushinak was probably born of Kutir-Nakhkhunte and his own daughter, Nakhkhunte-utu. He was defeated by Nebuchadnezzar I of Babylon, who sacked Susa and returned the statue of Marduk, but who was then himself defeated by the Assyrian king Ashur-resh-ishi I. He fled to Anshan, but later returned to Susa, and his brother Shilhana-Hamru-Lagamar may have succeeded him as last king of the Shutrukid dynasty. Following Khutelutush-In-Shushinak, the power of the Elamite empire began to wane seriously, as after the death of this ruler, Elam disappears into obscurity for more than three centuries.

=== Neo-Elamite period (c. 1100 – 540 BC) ===
==== Neo-Elamite I (c. 1100 – c. 770 BC) ====
Very little is known of this period. Anshan was still at least partially Elamite. There appear to have been unsuccessful alliances of Elamites, Babylonians, Chaldeans and other peoples against the powerful Neo Assyrian Empire (911–605 BC); the Babylonian king Mar-biti-apla-ushur (984–979 BC) was of Elamite origin, and Elamites are recorded to have fought unsuccessfully with the Babylonian king Marduk-balassu-iqbi against the Assyrian forces under Shamshi-Adad V (823–811 BC).

==== Neo-Elamite II (c. 770 – 646 BC) ====
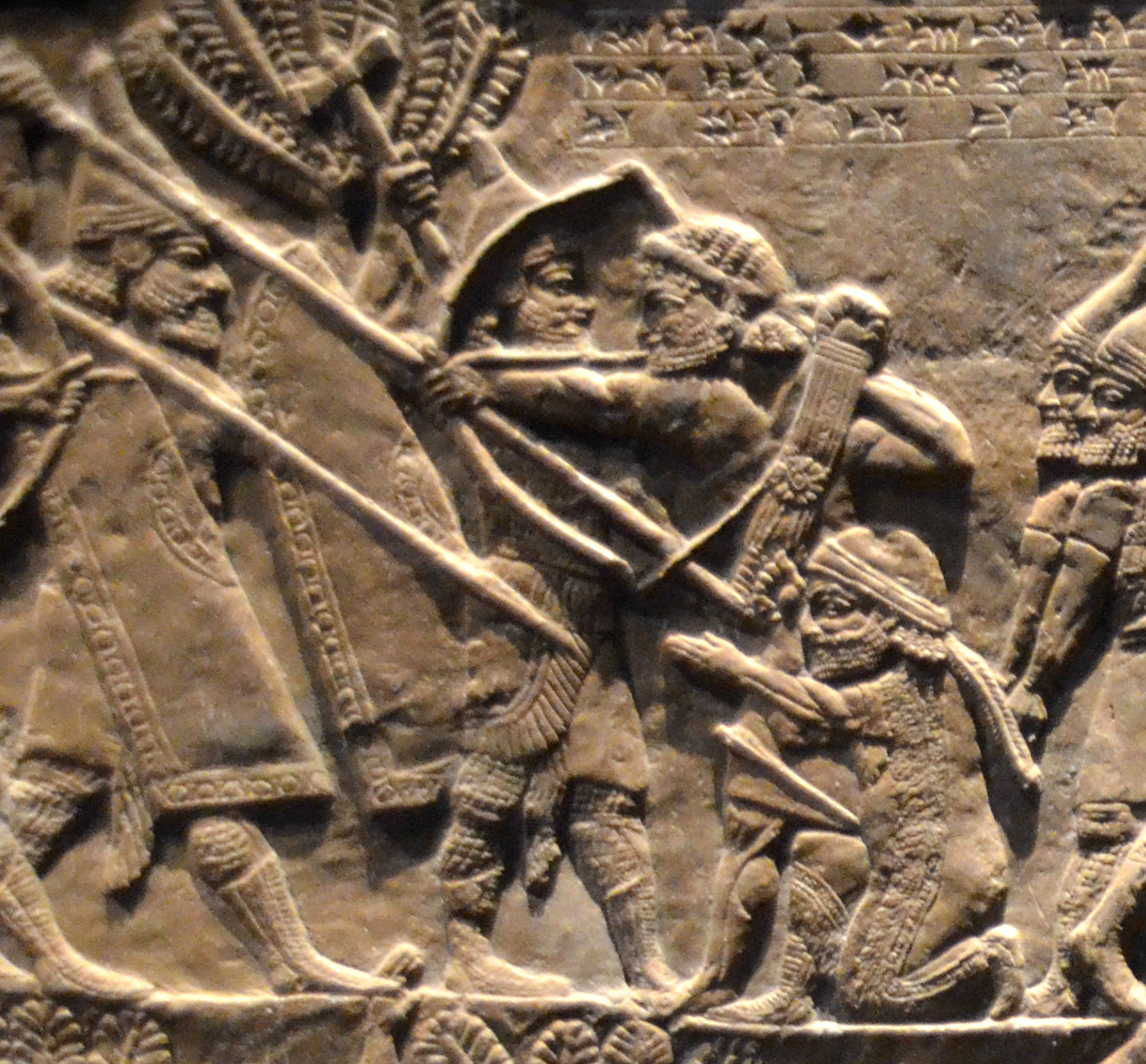
Elamite archer fighting against the Neo-Assyrian troops of Ashurbanipal, and protecting wounded king Teumman (kneeling), at the Battle of Ulai, 653 BC.

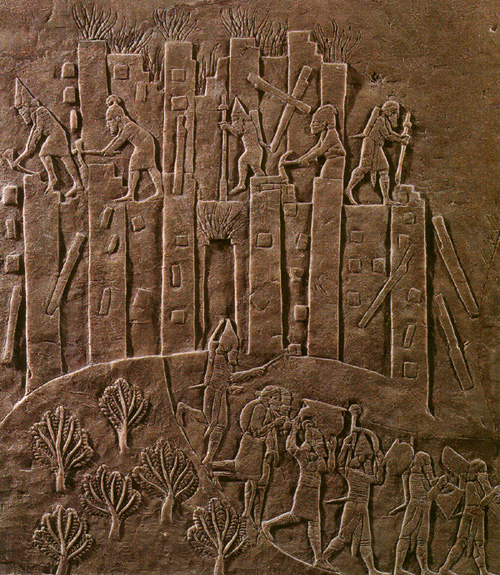
Ashurbanipal's campaign against Elam is triumphantly recorded in this relief showing the sack of Hamanu in 647 BC. Here, flames rise from the city as Assyrian soldiers topple it with pickaxes and crowbars and carry off the spoils.

The later Neo-Elamite period is characterized by a significant migration of Indo-European speaking Iranians to the Iranian plateau. Assyrian sources beginning around 800 BC distinguish the "powerful Medes", i.e. the actual Medes, Persians, Parthians, Sagartians, etc. Among these pressuring tribes were the Parsu, first recorded in 844 BC as living on the southeastern shore of Lake Urmiah, but who by the end of this period would cause the Elamites' original home, the Iranian Plateau, to be renamed Persia proper. These newly arrived Iranian peoples were also conquered by Assyria, and largely regarded as vassals of the Neo-Assyrian Empire until the late 7th century.

More details are known from the late 8th century BC, when the Elamites were allied with the Chaldean chieftain Merodach-baladan to defend the cause of Babylonian independence from Assyria. Humban-nikash I (743–717 BC) supported Merodach-baladan against Sargon II, apparently without success; while his successor, Shutruk-Nahhunte II (716–699 BC), was routed by Sargon's troops during an expedition in 710, and another Elamite defeat by Sargon's troops is recorded for 708. The Assyrian dominion over Babylon was underlined by Sargon's son Sennacherib, who defeated the Elamites, Chaldeans and Babylonians and dethroned Merodach-baladan for a second time, installing his own son Ashur-nadin-shumi on the Babylonian throne in 700.

Shutruk-Nakhkhunte II, the last Elamite to claim the old title "king of Anshan and Susa", was murdered by his brother Hallutash-Inshushinak I, who managed to briefly capture the Assyrian governor of Babylonia Ashur-nadin-shumi and the city of Babylon in 694 BC. Sennacherib soon responded by invading and ravaging Elam. Khallushu was in turn assassinated by Kutir-Nahhunte III, who succeeded him but soon abdicated in favor of Humban-numena III (692–689 BC). Khumma-Menanu recruited a new army to help the Babylonians and Chaldeans against the Assyrians at the battle of Halule in 691. Both sides claimed the victory in their annals, but Babylon was destroyed by Sennacherib only two years later, and its Elamite allies defeated in the process.

The reigns of Humban-Haltash I (688–681 BC) and Humban-Haltash II (680–675 BC) saw a deterioration of Elamite-Babylonian relations, and both of them raided Sippar. At the beginning of Esarhaddon's reign in Assyria (681–669 BC), Nabu-zer-kitti-lišir, an ethnically Elamite governor in the south of Babylonia, revolted and besieged Ur, but was routed by the Assyrians and fled to Elam where the king of Elam, fearing Assyrian repercussions, took him prisoner and put him to the sword.

Urtaku (674–664 BC) for some time wisely maintained good relations with the Assyrian king Ashurbanipal (668–627 BC), who sent wheat to Susiana during a famine. But these friendly relations were only temporary, and Urtaku was killed in battle during a failed Elamite attack on Assyria.

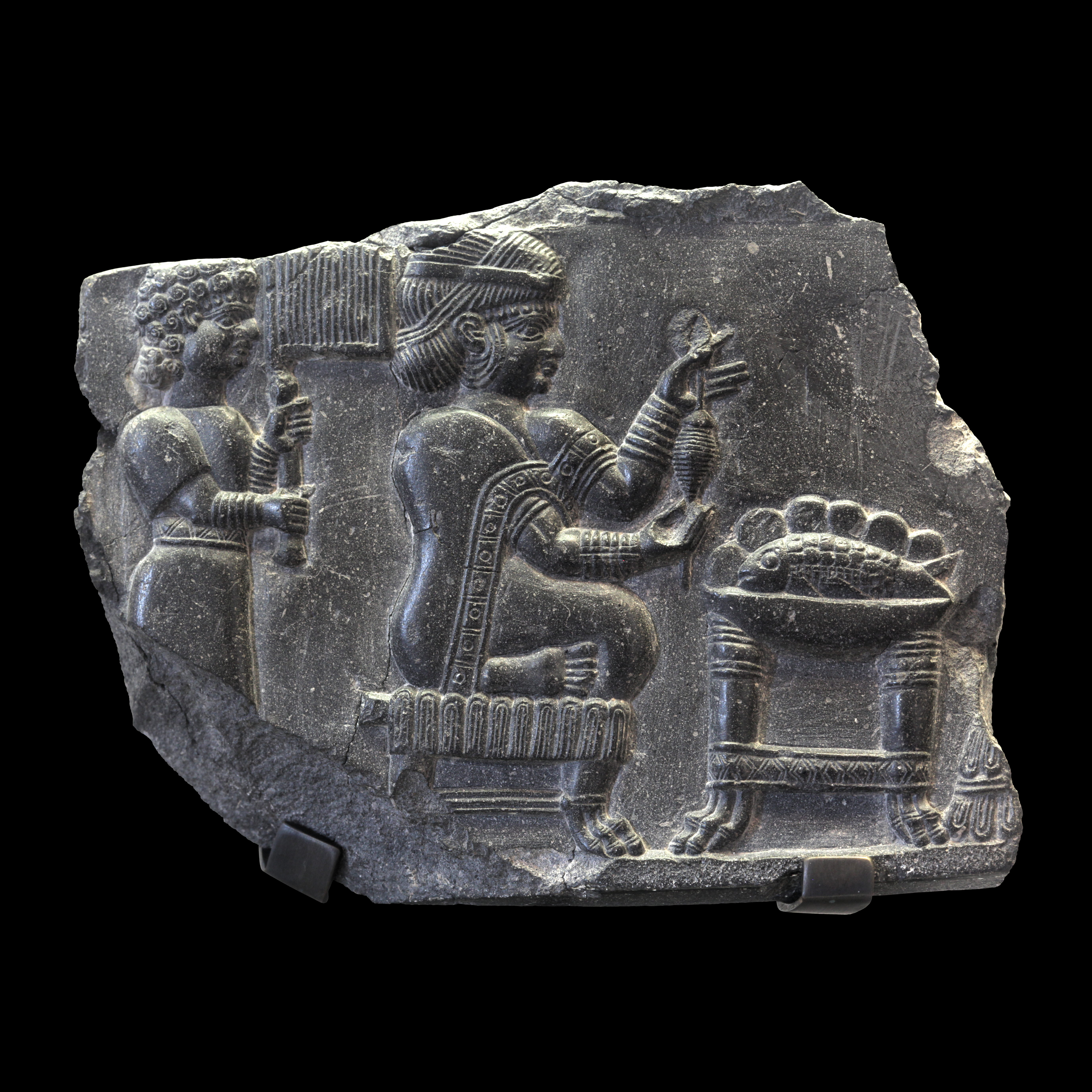
Relief of a woman being fanned by an attendant while she holds what may be a spinning device before a table with a bowl containing a whole fish (700–550 BC).

His successor Tepti-Humban-Inshushinak (664–653 BC) attacked Assyria, but was defeated and killed by Ashurbanipal following the battle of the Ulaï in 653 BC; and Susa itself was sacked and occupied by the Assyrians. In this same year the Assyrian vassal Median state to the north fell to the invading Scythians and Cimmerians under Madyes, and displacing another Assyrian vassal people, the Parsu (Persians) to Anshan which their king Teispes captured that same year, turning it for the first time into an Indo-Iranian kingdom under Assyrian dominance that would a century later become the nucleus of the Achaemenid dynasty. The Assyrians successfully subjugated and drove the Scythians and Cimmerians from their Iranian colonies, and the Persians, Medes and Parthians remained vassals of Assyria.

A brief respite to the Elamites was provided by the civil war between Ashurbanipal and his own brother Shamash-shum-ukin, whom their father Esarhaddon had installed as the vassal king of Babylon. The Elamites gave support to Shamash-shum-ukin, but also engaged in fighting among themselves. Babylon was besieged in midsummer of 650 BC, and fell by 648 BC; Shamash-shum-ukin died in a fire. The Elamite kingdom was greatly weakened by rebellions and civil wars; kings from 651 to 640 had short reigns before being usurped, overthrown, or captured by the Assyrians. Having dealt with his brother, Ashurbanipal sensed an opportunity to devastate Elam. In 646 BC Ashurbanipal devastated Susiana with ease, and sacked Susa. He installed several vassal kings such as Tammaritu, although these quickly broke off relations with Assyria over their pillages. The last Elamite king, Humban-Haltash III, was captured in 640 BC by Ashurbanipal, who annexed and destroyed the country.

In a tablet unearthed in 1854 by Austen Henry Layard, Ashurbanipal boasts of the destruction he had wrought:

Susa, the great holy city, abode of their Gods, seat of their mysteries, I conquered. I entered its palaces, I opened their treasuries where silver and gold, goods and wealth were amassed ... I destroyed the ziggurat of Susa. I smashed its shining copper horns. I reduced the temples of Elam to naught; their gods and goddesses I scattered to the winds. The tombs of their ancient and recent kings I devastated, I exposed to the sun, and I carried away their bones toward the land of Ashur. I devastated the provinces of Elam and on their lands I sowed salt.

==== Neo-Elamite III (646–539 BC) ====
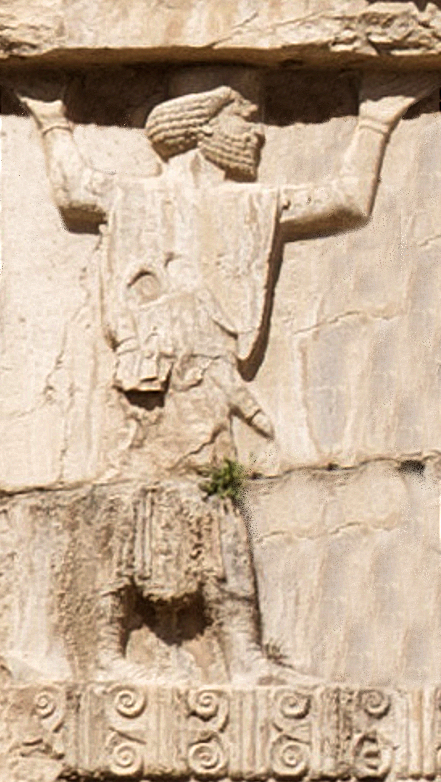
Elamite soldier in the Achaemenid army circa 470 BC, Xerxes I tomb relief.

The devastation was a little less complete than Ashurbanipal boasted, and a weak and fragmented Elamite rule was resurrected soon after with Shuttir-Nakhkhunte, son of Humban-umena III (not to be confused with Shuttir-Nakhkhunte, son of Indada, a petty king in the first half of the 6th century). Elamite royalty in the final century preceding the Achaemenids was fragmented among different small kingdoms, the united Elamite nation having been destroyed and colonised by the Assyrians. The three kings at the close of the 7th century (Shuttir-Nakhkhunte, Khallutush-In-Shushinak and Atta-Khumma-In-Shushinak) still called themselves "king of Anzan and of Susa" or "enlarger of the kingdom of Anzan and of Susa", at a time when the Achaemenid Persians were already ruling Anshan under Assyrian dominance.

The various Assyrian Empires, which had been the dominant force in the Near East, Asia Minor, the Caucasus, North Africa, Arabian Peninsula and East Mediterranean for much of the period from the first half of the 14th century BC, began to unravel after the death of Ashurbanipal in 631 BC, descending into a series of bitter internal civil wars which also spread to Babylonia. The Iranian Medes, Parthians, Persians and Sagartians, who had been largely subject to Assyria since their arrival in the region around 1000 BC, quietly took full advantage of the anarchy in Assyria, and in 616 BC freed themselves from Assyrian rule.

The Medians took control of Elam during this period. Cyaxares the king of the Medes, Persians, Parthians and Sagartians entered into an alliance with a coalition of fellow former vassals of Assyria, including Nabopolassar of Babylon and Chaldea, and also the Scythians and Cimmerians, against Sin-shar-ishkun of Assyria, who was faced with unremitting civil war in Assyria itself. This alliance then attacked a disunited and war weakened Assyria, and between 616 BC and 599 BC at the very latest, had conquered its vast empire which stretched from the Caucasus Mountains to Egypt, Libya and the Arabian Peninsula, and from Cyprus and Ephesus to Persia and the Caspian Sea.

The major cities in Assyria itself were gradually taken; Arrapḫa (modern Kirkuk) and Kalhu (modern Nimrud) in 616 BC, Ashur, Dur-Sharrukin and Arbela (modern Erbil) in 613, Nineveh falling in 612, Harran in 608 BC, Carchemish in 605 BC, and finally Dur-Katlimmu by 599 BC. Elam, already largely destroyed and subjugated by Assyria, thus became easy prey for the Median dominated Iranian peoples, and was incorporated into the Median Empire (612–546 BC) and then the succeeding Achaemenid Empire (546–332 BC), with Assyria suffering the same fate. (see Achaemenid Assyria, Athura).

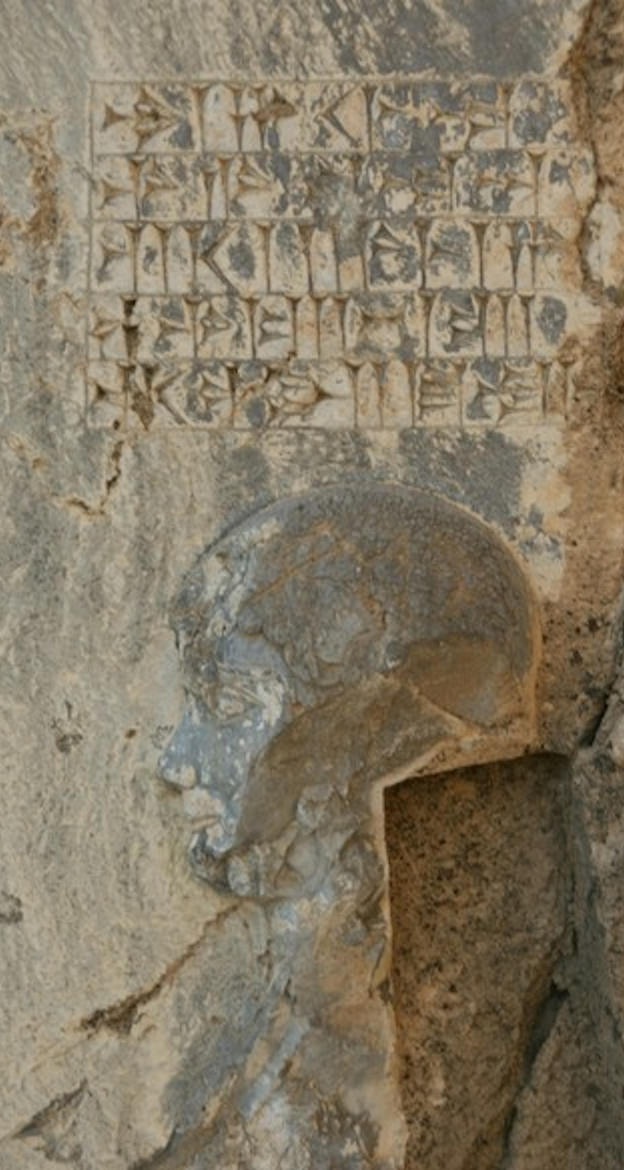
Âššina, one of the last kings of Elam circa 522 BC was toppled, enchained and killed by Darius the Great. The label over him says: "This is Âššina. He lied, saying "I am king of Elam.""

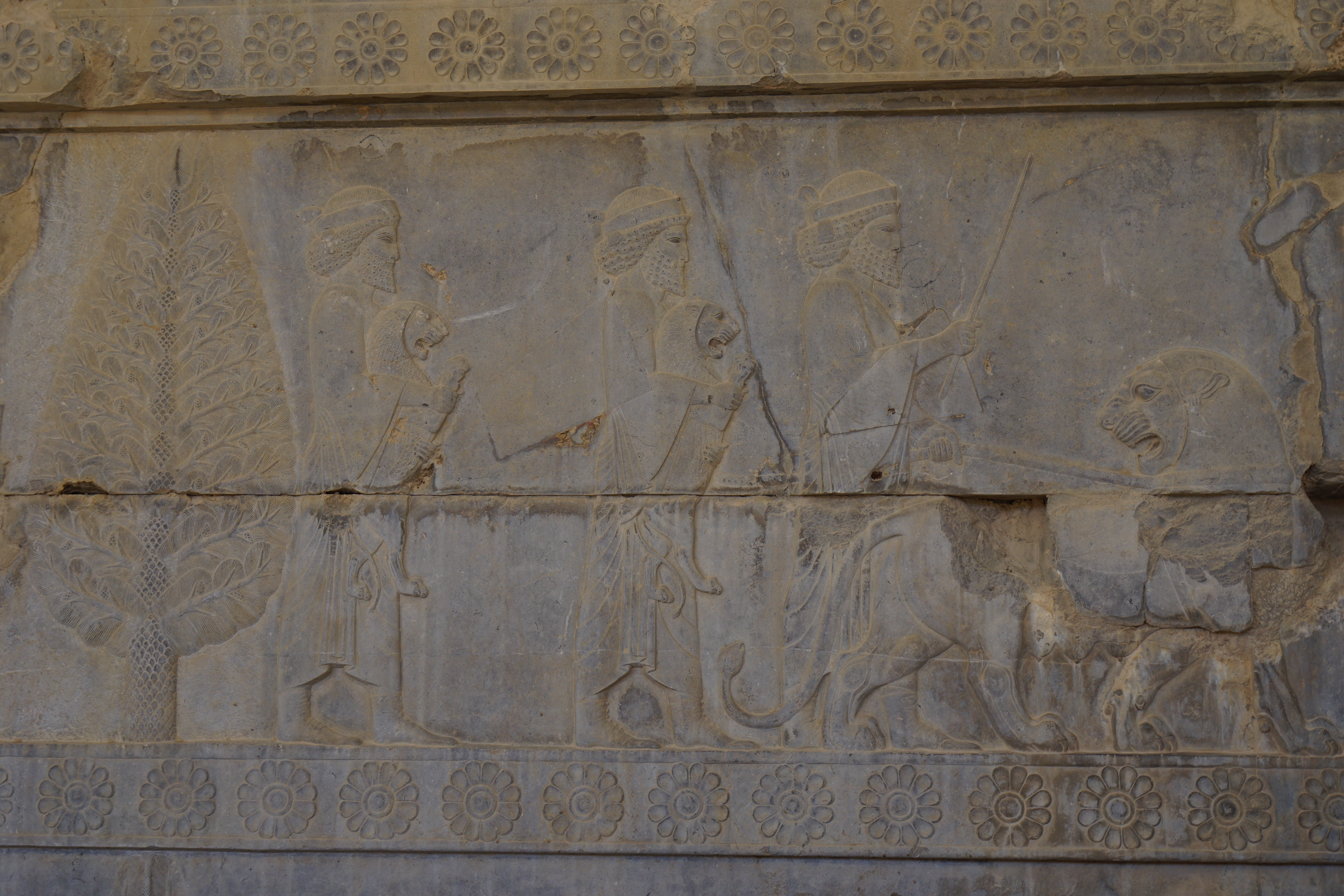
Elamite delegation, relief from Apadana of Persepolis

Their successors Khumma-Menanu and Shilhak-In-Shushinak II bore the simple title "king", and the final king Tempti-Khumma-In-Shushinak used no honorific at all. In 540 BC, Achaemenid rule began in Susa.

=== Elymais (187 BC – 224 AD) ===
Elymaïs was the location of the death of Antiochus III the Great who was killed while pillaging a temple of Bel in 187 BC. Following the rise and fall of the Achaemenid Empire and the Seleucid Empire, a new dynasty of Elamite rulers established Elymais from 147 BC to 224 AD, usually under the suzerainty of the Parthian Empire, until the advent of the unified Sasanian Empire in 224 AD.

== Art ==
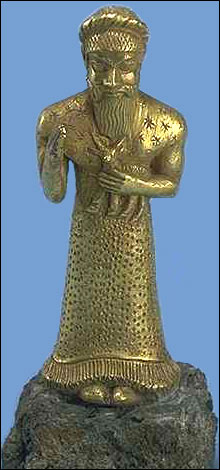
Golden statuette of a man (probably a king) carrying a goat. Susa, Iran, c. 1500–1200 BC (Middle Elamite period).

=== Statuettes ===
Dated to approximately the 12th century BC, gold and silver figurines of Elamite worshippers are shown carrying a sacrificial goat. These divine and royal statues were meant to assure the king of the enduring protection of the deity, well-being and a long life. Works which showed a ruler and his performance of a ritual action were intended to eternalize the effectiveness of such deeds. Found near the Temple of Inshushinak in Susa, these statuettes would have been considered charged with beneficial power.

While archaeologists cannot be certain that the location where these figures were found indicates a date before or in the time of the Elamite king Shilhak-Inshushinak, stylistic features can help ground the figures in a specific time period. The hairstyle and costume of the figures which are strewn with dots and hemmed with short fringe at the bottom, and the precious metals point to a date in the latter part of the second millennium BC rather than to the first millennium.

In general, any gold or silver statuettes which represent the king making a sacrifice not only served a religious function, but was also a display of wealth.

=== Seals ===
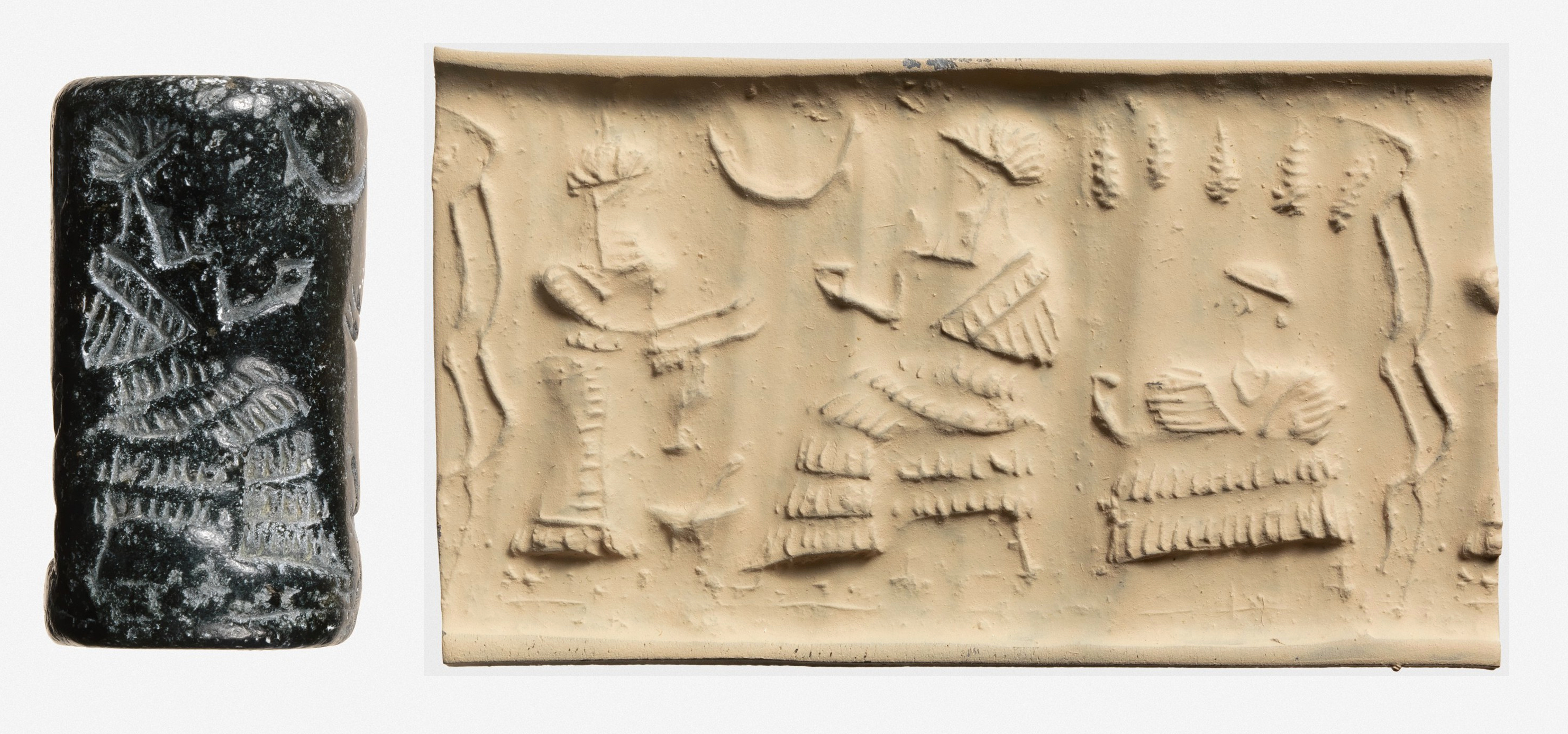
Cylinder seal and modern impression- worshiper before a seated ruler or deity; seated female under a grape arbor MET DP370181

Elamite seals reached their peak of complexity in the 4th millennium BC when their shape became cylindrical rather than stamp-like. Seals were primarily used as a form of identification and were often made out of precious stones. Because seals for different time periods had different designs and themes, seals and seal impressions can be used to track the various phases of the Elamite Empire and can teach a lot about the empire in ways which other forms of documentation cannot.

The seal pictured shows two seated figures holding cups with a man in front of them wearing a long robe next to a table. A man is sitting on a throne, presumably the king, and is in a wrapped robe. The second figure, perhaps his queen, is draped in a wide, flounced garment and is elevated on a platform beneath an overhanging vine. A crescent is shown in the field.

=== Statue of Queen Napir-Asu ===
Statue of Napirasu

This life-size votive offering of Queen Napir-Asu was commissioned around 1300 BC in Susa, Iran. It is made of copper using the lost-wax casting method and rests on a solid bronze frame that weighs 1750 kg (3760 lb). This statue is different from many other Elamite statues of women because it resembles male statues due to the wide belt on the dress and the patterns which closely resemble those on male statues.

The inscription on the side of the statue curses anyone, specifically men, who attempts to destroy the statue: "I, Napir-Asu, wife of Untash-Napirisha. He who would seize my statue, who would smash it, who would destroy its inscription, who would erase my name, may he be smitten by the curse of Napirisha, of Kiririsha, and of Inshushinka, that his name shall become extinct, that his offspring be barren, that the forces of Beltiya, the great goddess, shall sweep down on him. This is Napir-Asu's offering."

=== Stele of Untash Napirisha ===
The stele of the Elamite king, Untash-Napirisha was believed to have been commissioned in the 12th century BC. It was moved from the original religious capital of Chogha Zanbil to the city of Susa by the successor king, Shutruk-Nahnante. Four registers of the stele are left. The remains depict the god Inshushinak validating the legitimacy of who is thought to be Shutruk-Nahnante. In the periphery are two priestesses, deity hybrids of fish and women holding streams of water, and two half-man half-mouflon guardians of the sacred tree. The names of the two priestesses are carved on their arms.

King Untash Napirisha dedicated the stele to the god Ishushinak. Like other forms of art in the ancient Near East, this one portrays a king ceremonially recognizing a deity. This stele is unique in that the acknowledgement between king and god is reciprocal.

== Religion ==
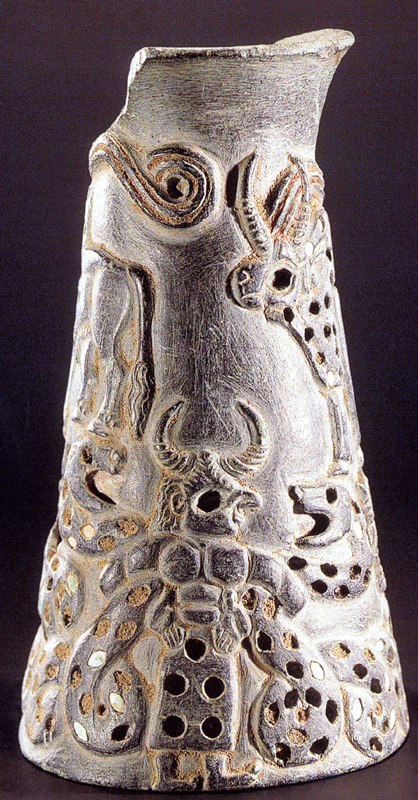
A carved chlorite vase decorated with a relief depicting a "two-horned" figure wrestling with serpent goddesses. The Elamite artifact was discovered by Iran's border police in the possession of historical heritage traffickers en route to Turkey and was confiscated. Style is determined to be from "Jiroft".

The Elamites practised polytheism. Due to scarcity of sources, past scholars assumed that Elamite religion must have been characterized by the "ill-defined character of the individual gods and goddesses. ...Most of them were not only ineffable beings whose real name was either not uttered or was unknown, but also sublime ideas, not to be exactly defined by the human race." Worship also varied between localities. However, more recent scholarship shows that Elamite deities most likely were not any less defined than those of their Sumerian, Akkadian and Hurrian neighbors.

Inscriptions of many Elamite kings indicate that a concept of a supreme triad consisting of Inshushinak (originally the civic protector god of Susa, eventually the leader of the triad and guarantor of the monarchy), Kiririsha (an earth/mother goddess in southern Elam), and Napirisha existed. In the Neo-Elamite period Humban, previously a deity of limited relevance in known sources, emerged as a divine source of royal power.

Another significant deity was Pinikir, an astral goddess of love, similar to Ishtar. Some researchers, especially in the 1960s and 1970s, saw her as a mother goddess, and possibly originally chief deity, in northern Elam, later supplanted by or identified with Kiririsha, but scholars no longer support this view.

There were also imported deities, such as Beltiya, Nergal or Nanaya; some native Elamite deities had Akkadian or Sumerian names as well (ex. Manzat, Inshushinak and his attendants), indicating a long history of interchange. Some Elamite deities were also venerated outside Elam: Pinikir was known to the Hurrians and Hittites, Simut appeared in Babylonian personal names, and an Assyrian text mentions Khumban, Napirisha and Yabru (Jabru) as protectors of the king.

=== List of Elamite gods ===
| Name | Mesopotamian equivalent | Functions | Notes |
|---|---|---|---|
| Ashara | | | Seemingly the same goddess as Eblaite Ishara. |
| Hišmitik | | A deity associated with Ruhurater who shared a temple with him in Chogha Zanbil | |
| Humban | Enlil | Bestowed kittin upon kings. | Worshiped by Persians in early Achaemenid times as well. |
| Inshushinak | Ninurta | Tutelary god of Susa; protector of monarchy; underworld god | Also known in Mesopotamia as an underworld god in the entourage of Ereshkigal. |
| Ishmekarab | | Attendant of Inshushinak. Protector of oaths. | The name has Akkadian origin. |
| Jabru | Anu or Enlil | | Only known from Mesopotamian sources. |
| Kiririsha | possibly Ninhursag | Mother goddess; also an afterlife goddess as evidenced by the epithet "zana Liyan lahakra", "lady of death in Liyan" | Incorrectly assumed to be a "taboo name" of Pinikir in the past. She and Napirisha were possibly regarded as a divine couple. |
| Kirmašir | | A deity from Awan. | |
| Kunzibami, Šihhaš and Šennukušu | Adad | weather god(s) | Adad, under the Akkadian name and alongside his wife Shala, was himself worshiped in Elam (ex. in Chogha Zanbil) and none of these 3 names are attested outside Mesopotamian god lists, unless the ideogram ^{d}IM refers to more than one weather god in Elamite sources (ex. in personal names). Wouter Henkelman proposes Kunzibami, Šihhaš and Šennukušu are either locally used Elamite epithets of Adad or local (rather than national) weather gods, and notes that Šennukušu is a Sumerian rather than Elamite name. |
| Lagamar | Nergal | Underworld god, associated with Inshushinak | The name has Akkadian origin. |
| Manzat | | Goddess of the rainbow; possibly Belet/Nin-Ali, "lady of the city" | Originally an Akkadian goddess |
| Mašti | | Mother goddess. | |
| Nahhunte | Utu | Sun god. | Never equated with Utu/Shamash directly though it's possible the ideographic writing "^{d}Utu" of his name was used in personal names. |
| Narundi | Ishtar or Nanaya | A goddess known from Susa. | Regarded as a sister of the so-called "Divine Seven of Elam" from Mesopotamian god lists. |
| Napir | | Moon god | |
| Napirisha | Enki | One of the supreme gods, possibly linked to water. | Formerly incorrectly believed to be a "taboo name" of Humban. There is some evidence that in Elam Inshushinak, rather than Napirisha, was associated with Ea, as well as with the god Enzag from Dilmun. |
| Pinikir | Ishtar, Ninsianna | Goddess of love and sex, "queen of heaven" | Also incorporated into Hurrian religion. |
| Ruhurater | Ninurta | Possibly a god responsible for creation of humans. | |
| Simut | Nergal | Herald of the gods | Associated with Mars in Mesopotamia. |
| Tepti | | Known from Neo-Elamite sources. | |
| Tirutur | | Known from Middle and Neo-Elamite sources. | |
| Upur-kubak | | A goddess described as "lady who dipenses the light" by Huteltush-Inshushinak | |

== Language ==
Elamite is traditionally thought to be a language isolate, and completely unrelated to the neighbouring Semitic languages, Sumerian and Kassite (also isolates), Hurrian, and the later arriving Indo-European Iranian languages that came to dominate the region of Elam from the 6th century BC. It was written in a cuneiform adapted from the Semitic Akkadian script of Assyria and Babylonia, although the very earliest documents were written in the quite different "Linear Elamite" script. In 2006, two even older inscriptions in a similar script were discovered at Jiroft to the east of Elam, leading archaeologists to speculate that Linear Elamite had originally spread from further east to Susa. It seems to have developed from an even earlier writing known as "proto-Elamite", but scholars are not unanimous on whether or not this script was used to write Elamite or another language, as it has not yet been deciphered. Several stages of the language are attested; the earliest date back to the third millennium BC, the latest to the Achaemenid Empire.

The Elamite language may have survived as late as the early Islamic period (roughly contemporary with the early medieval period in Europe). Among other Islamic medieval historians, Ibn al-Nadim, for instance, wrote that "The Iranian languages are Fahlavi (Pahlavi), Dari (not to be confused with Dari Persian in modern Afghanistan), Khuzi, Persian and Suryani (syriac)", and Ibn Moqaffa noted that Khuzi was the unofficial language of the royalty of Persia, "Khuz" being the corrupted name for Elam.

=== Suggested relations to other language families ===
While Elamite is viewed as a language isolate by the vast majority of linguists, a minority of scholars have proposed that the Elamite language could be related to the Dravidian languages. David McAlpin believed Elamite may be related to the living Dravidian languages. This hypothesis (which has been subject to serious criticism by linguists) is considered under the rubric of Elamo-Dravidian languages.

== Legacy ==
The Assyrians had utterly destroyed the Elamite nation, but new polities emerged in the area after Assyrian power faded. Some time after that region fell to Madius the Scythian (653 BC), Teispes, son of Achaemenes, conquered Elamite Anshan in the mid 7th century BC, forming a nucleus that would expand into the Persian Empire. They were largely regarded as vassals of the Assyrians, and the Medes, Mannaeans, and Persians paid tribute to Assyria from the 10th century BC until the death of Ashurbanipal in 631 BC. After his death, the Medes played a major role in the destruction of the weakened Assyrian Empire in 612 BC.

The rise of the Achaemenids in the 6th century BC brought an end to the existence of Elam as an independent political power "but not as a cultural entity" (Encyclopædia Iranica, Columbia University). Indigenous Elamite traditions, such as the use of the title "king of Anshan" by Cyrus the Great; the "Elamite robe" worn by Cambyses I of Anshan and seen on the famous winged genii at Pasargadae; some glyptic styles; the use of Elamite as the first of three official languages of the empire used in thousands of administrative texts found at Darius' city of Persepolis; the continued worship of Elamite deities; and the persistence of Elamite religious personnel and cults supported by the crown, formed an essential part of the newly emerging Achaemenid culture in Iran. The Elamites thus served as a cultural conduit through which Mesopotamian achievements spread in to the Iranian world.

Conversely, remnants of Elamite had "absorbed Iranian influences in both structure and vocabulary" by 500 BC, suggesting a form of cultural continuity or fusion connecting the Elamite and the Achaemenid periods. Arab sources refer to speakers of "Xūzī" which was not "Hebrew, Aramaic, or Persian" spoken by servants and isolated rural communities in Khuzestan until the 10th century. Scholars such as "von Spiegel, Huart, Spuler, Lazard, Potts, Orsatti, and Tavernier have already suggested or assumed that the language mentioned here is a very late form of Elamite."

The name of "Elam" survived into the Hellenistic period and beyond. In its Greek form, Elymais, it emerges as designating a semi-independent state under Parthian suzerainty during the 2nd century BC to the early 3rd century AD. In Acts 2:8–9 in the New Testament, the language of the Elamitēs is one of the languages heard at the Pentecost. From 410 onwards Elam (Beth Huzaye) was the senior metropolitan province of the Church of the East, surviving into the 14th century. Indian Carmelite historian John Marshal has proposed that the root of Carmelite history in the Indian subcontinent could be traced to the promise of restoration of Elam (Jeremiah 49:39).

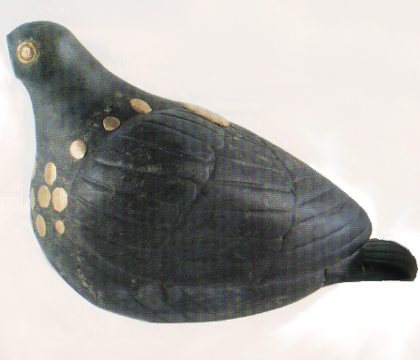
A 4.5 inch long lapis lazuli dove is studded with gold pegs. Dated 1200 BC from Susa, a city later on shared with the Achaemenids.

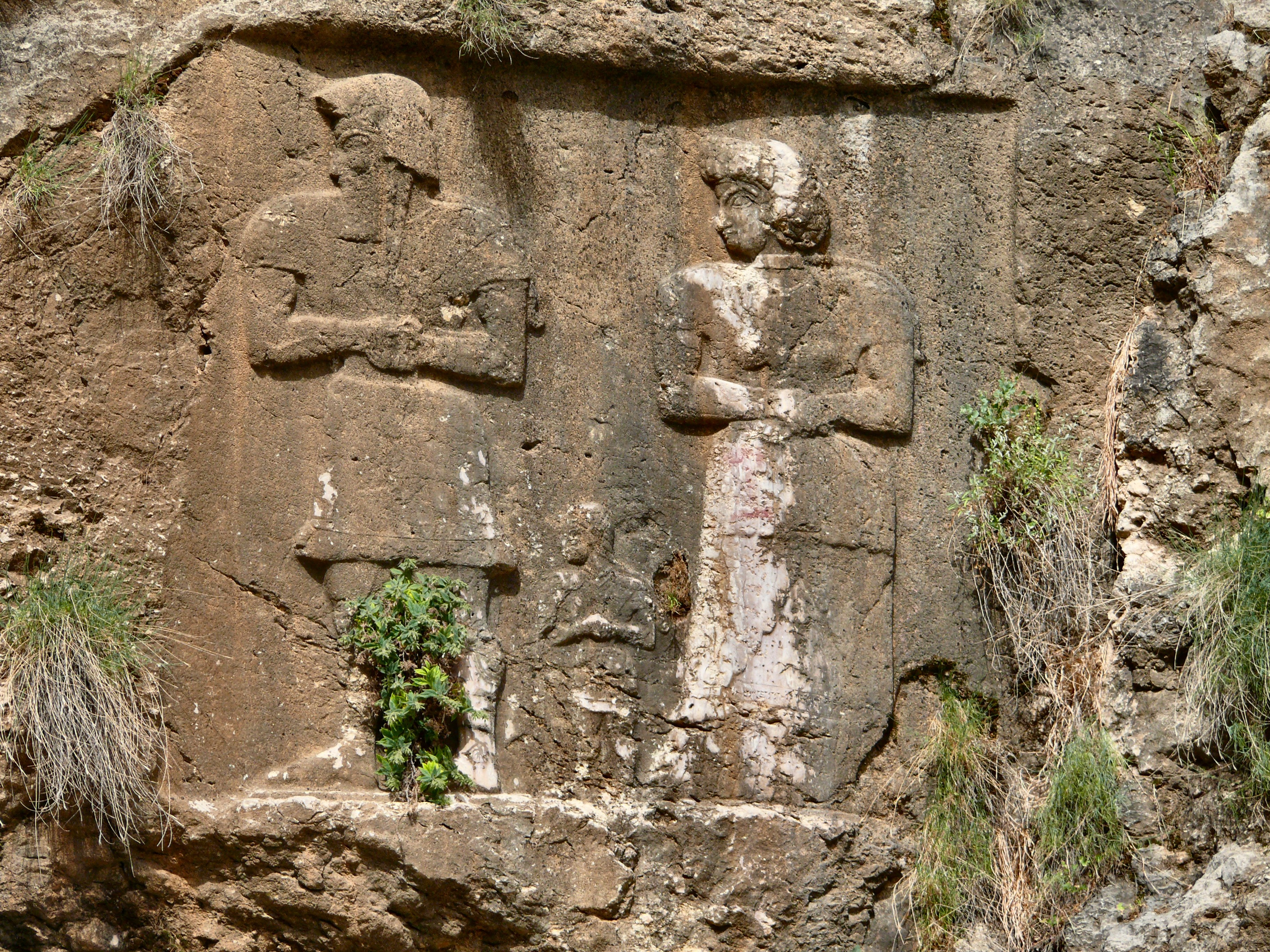
Elamite reliefs at Eshkaft-e Salman. The picture of a woman with dignity shows the importance of women in the Elamite era.

In modern Iran, Ilam Province and Khuzestan Province are named after Elam civilization. Khuzestan means land of the Khuzis and Khuzi itself is a Middle Persian name for Elamites.

== See also ==
- Jam Arjan
- Dravidians
- Jiroft culture
- List of rulers of Elam

== Sources ==
- Quintana Cifuentes, E., "Historia de Elam el vecino mesopotámico", Murcia, 1997. Estudios Orientales. IPOA-Murcia.
- Quintana Cifuentes, E., "Textos y Fuentes para el estudio del Elam", Murcia, 2000. Estudios Orientales. IPOA-Murcia.
- Quintana Cifuentes, E., La Lengua Elamita (Irán pre-persa), Madrid, 2010. Gram Ediciones. ISBN 978-84-88519-17-7
- Khačikjan, Margaret: The Elamite Language, Documenta Asiana IV, Consiglio Nazionale delle Ricerche Istituto per gli Studi Micenei ed Egeo-Anatolici, 1998 ISBN 88-87345-01-5
- Desset, François (2020a). "Breaking the Code: The Decipherment of Linear Elamite, a Forgotten Writing System of Ancient Iran (3rd Millenium BC)". Canal-U.
- Desset, François (2020b). A New History of Writing on The Iranian Plateau – via YouTube.
- Persians: Masters of Empire, Time-Life Books, Alexandria, Virginia (1995) ISBN 0-8094-9104-4
- Pittman, Holly (1984). Art of the Bronze Age: southeastern Iran, western Central Asia, and the Indus Valley. New York: The Metropolitan Museum of Art. ISBN 9780870993657.
- D. T. Potts, "Elamites and Kassites in the Persian Gulf",Journal of Near Eastern Studies, vol. 65, no. 2, pp. 111–119, (April 2006)
- Potts, Daniel T. (2016) [1999]. The Archaeology of Elam: Formation and Transformation of an Ancient Iranian State. Cambridge University Press. ISBN 978-1-107-09469-7.
- McAlpin, David W., Proto Elamo Dravidian: The Evidence and Its Implications, American Philosophy Society (1981) ISBN 0-87169-713-0
- Vallat, François. 2010. "The History of Elam". The Circle of Ancient Iranian Studies (CAIS)
- Álvarez-Mon, Javier; Basello, Gian Pietro; Wicks, Yasmina, eds. (2018). The Elamite World. Routledge Worlds. Oxford: Routledge. ISBN 978-1-138-99989-3.
- Giuseppe Valenza, Elamiti Elimioti Elimi Il Teatro Genealogico degli Elimi nel crocevia del Mediterraneo. Marostica, 2022, ISBN 978-88-908854-2-6.
