= Nergal-ushezib =

Babylonian king

King of Babylon
- Reign: 694–September 693 BC
- Predecessor: Ashur-nadin-shumi
- Successor: Mushezib-Marduk

Nergal-ushezib, originally Shuzub, was a Babylonian nobleman who was installed as King of Babylon by the Elamites in 694 BC, after their capture of Babylon and deposition and murder of the previous king Ashur-nadin-shumi, son of King Sennacherib of Assyria.

Nergal-ushezib reigned as King for little more than a year. Sennacherib soon made war on Babylon to recover the city and avenge his son's death. Nergal-ushezib was defeated and captured by the Assyrians in battle near Nippur in September 693 BC. Nergal-ushezib's subsequent fate is unknown. He was succeeded by the Chaldean prince Mushezib-Marduk, who continued the resistance against Assyria.

Preceded by Ashur-nadin-shumi	King of Babylon; 694–693 BC	Succeeded by Mushezib-Marduk
