= Bel-ibni =

King of Babylon

Bēl-ibni was a Babylonian nobleman who served as King of Babylon for several years as the nominee of the Assyrian king Sennacherib.

Sennacherib, believing that direct Assyrian rule was too costly, appointed Bēl-ibni, a young Babylonian nobleman, belonging to the Rab-bani family, raised at the Assyrian court, King of Babylon in 703 BC.

The experiment with a native puppet king was hardly more successful than direct Assyrian control. Soon Bēl-ibni was conspiring with the Chaldeans and Elamites against the Assyrians. After defeating the opposing coalition in 700 BC, Sennacherib deposed Bēl-ibni and carried him off to Assyrian exile, replacing him with Sennacherib's own son, Ashur-nadin-shumi.

| Preceded by Marduk-apal-iddina II | King of Babylon; 703-700 BC | Succeeded by Ashur-nadin-shumi |
