= Mushezib-Marduk =

Babylonian king

Mushezib Marduk

King of Babylon
- Reign: September 693 – 689 BC
- Predecessor: Nergal-ushezib
- Successor: Monarchy abolished
- Died: 689 BC

Mushezib-Marduk (reigned 693 BC–689 BC), Chaldean prince chosen as King of Babylon after Nergal-ushezib.

He led the Babylonian populace in revolt against Assyria and King Sennacherib in 689 BC, with the support of Elam and King Humban-nimena (who was attacked by the Babylonians and the Assyrians only years before), at the Battle of Halule. It is not clear who won this battle, since both sides claimed victory, and all rulers remained on their thrones, but as the Assyrians subsequently retreated, they are likely to have suffered the greatest losses.

Mushezib-Marduk lost his ally when the Elamite king Humban-nimena suffered a stroke later that same year, an opportunity King Sennacherib quickly seized by attacking Babylon, and eventually capturing it after a nine-month siege. To avenge the death of his son, whom the Babylonians had effectively killed when they handed him over to the Elamites in 694 BC, Sennacherib pillaged and burned Babylon, tore down its walls, and even diverted the Euphrates into the city. During the Sack of Babylon, Mushezib-Marduk was most likely murdered.

== See also ==
- Kings of Babylon

Preceded by Nergal-ushezib	King of Babylon; 693–689 BC	Succeeded by Sennacherib
