= Aššur-nādin-šumi =

- King of Babylon

King of Babylon (vassal of the Neo-Assyrian Empire)
- Reign: 700–694 BC
- Predecessor: Bel-ibni
- Successor: Nergal-ushezib
- Died: 694 BC; Elam
- Akkadian: Aššur-nādin-šumi
- Dynasty: Sargonid dynasty
- Father: Sennacherib

Aššur-nādin-šumi (Neo-Assyrian Akkadian: 𒁹𒀸𒋩𒈬𒈬, romanized: Aššur-nādin-šumi, meaning "Ashur gives a name") was a son of the Neo-Assyrian king Sennacherib and was appointed by him as the king of Babylon, ruling southern Mesopotamia from 700 BC to his capture and execution by the Elamites in 694 BC. Aššur-nādin-šumi was probably Sennacherib's firstborn son and his first crown prince and thus the designated successor to the Assyrian throne.

== Biography ==
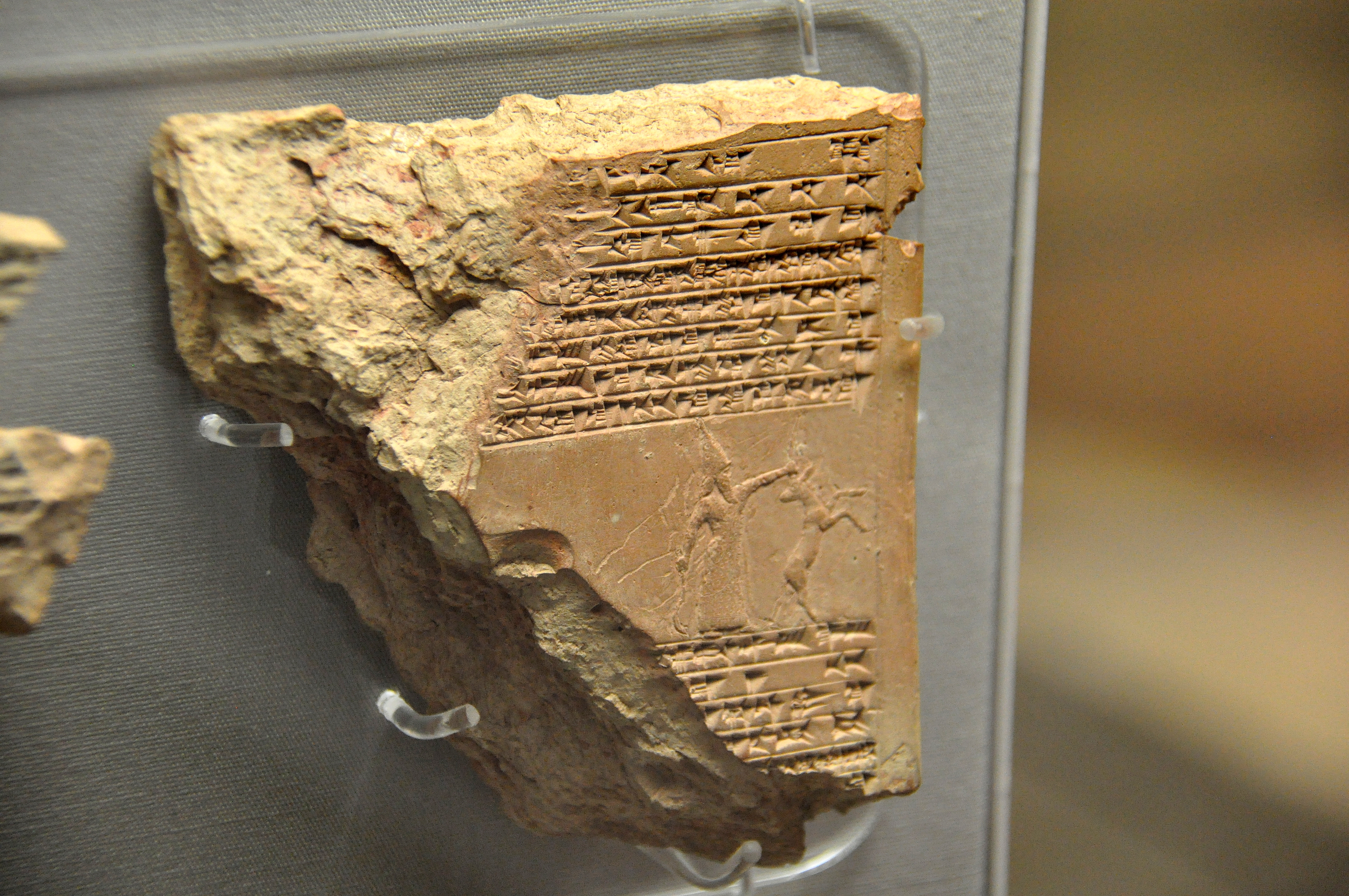
Confirmation by the later Babylonian king Šamaš-šuma-ukin, Aššur-nādin-šumi's nephew, of a grant originally made by Aššur-nādin-šumi. 670–650 BC. The tablet is currently housed in the British Museum.

Babylonia had been conquered by the Neo-Assyrian Empire by Tiglath-Pileser III (r. 745–727 BC) less than thirty years before Aššur-nādin-šumi became its king. During these thirty years, Babylonia had repeatedly attempted to once more become an independent kingdom. Babylonian revolts became an especially frequent nuisance during the reign of Sennacherib, who had to defeat numerous southern revolts throughout his reign.

After defeating uprisings in 700 BC, Sennacherib named his own son, Aššur-nādin-šumi, as the new king of Babylon. Aššur-nādin-šumi was also titled as māru rēštû, a title that could be interpreted either as the "pre-eminent son" or the "firstborn son". His appointment as King of Babylon and the new title suggests that Aššur-nādin-šumi was being groomed to also follow Sennacherib as the King of Assyria upon his death. Aššur-nādin-šumi being titled as the māru rēštû likely means that he was Sennacherib's crown prince; if it means "pre-eminent" such a title would be befitting only for the crown prince and if it means "firstborn", it also suggests that Aššur-nādin-šumi was the heir as the Assyrians in most cases followed the principle of primogeniture (the oldest son inherits). More evidence in favor of Aššur-nādin-šumi being the crown prince is Sennacherib's construction of a palace for him at the city of Assur, something Sennacherib would also do for the later crown prince Esarhaddon.

As an Assyrian king of Babylon, Aššur-nādin-šumi's position was politically important and highly delicate and would have granted valuable experience to him as the intended heir to the entire Neo-Assyrian Empire. However, Aššur-nādin-šumi's tenure as Babylonian king would not last long and he was unable to handle the volatile political situation in the south. In 694 BC, Sennacherib campaigned against Elam (modern day southern Iran) to chase after Chaldean rebels who had fled there. In response to this incursion into their territory, the Elamites invaded the southern parts of the Neo-Assyrian Empire and in 694 BC, probably encouraged by the Babylonians themselves, successfully captured Aššur-nādin-šumi at the city of Sippar. The prince was taken back to Elam and probably executed.

== See also ==
- Sargonid dynasty
- List of kings of Babylon
- Military history of the Neo-Assyrian Empire

Aššur-nādin-šumi Sargonid dynasty Died: 694 BC
Preceded by Bel-ibni	King of Babylon; 700 – 694 BC	Succeeded by Nergal-ushezib
