= Sennacherib =

King of the Neo-Assyrian Empire, 705–681 BC

- King of Assyria; King of Babylon; King of the Four Corners of the World; King of the Universe
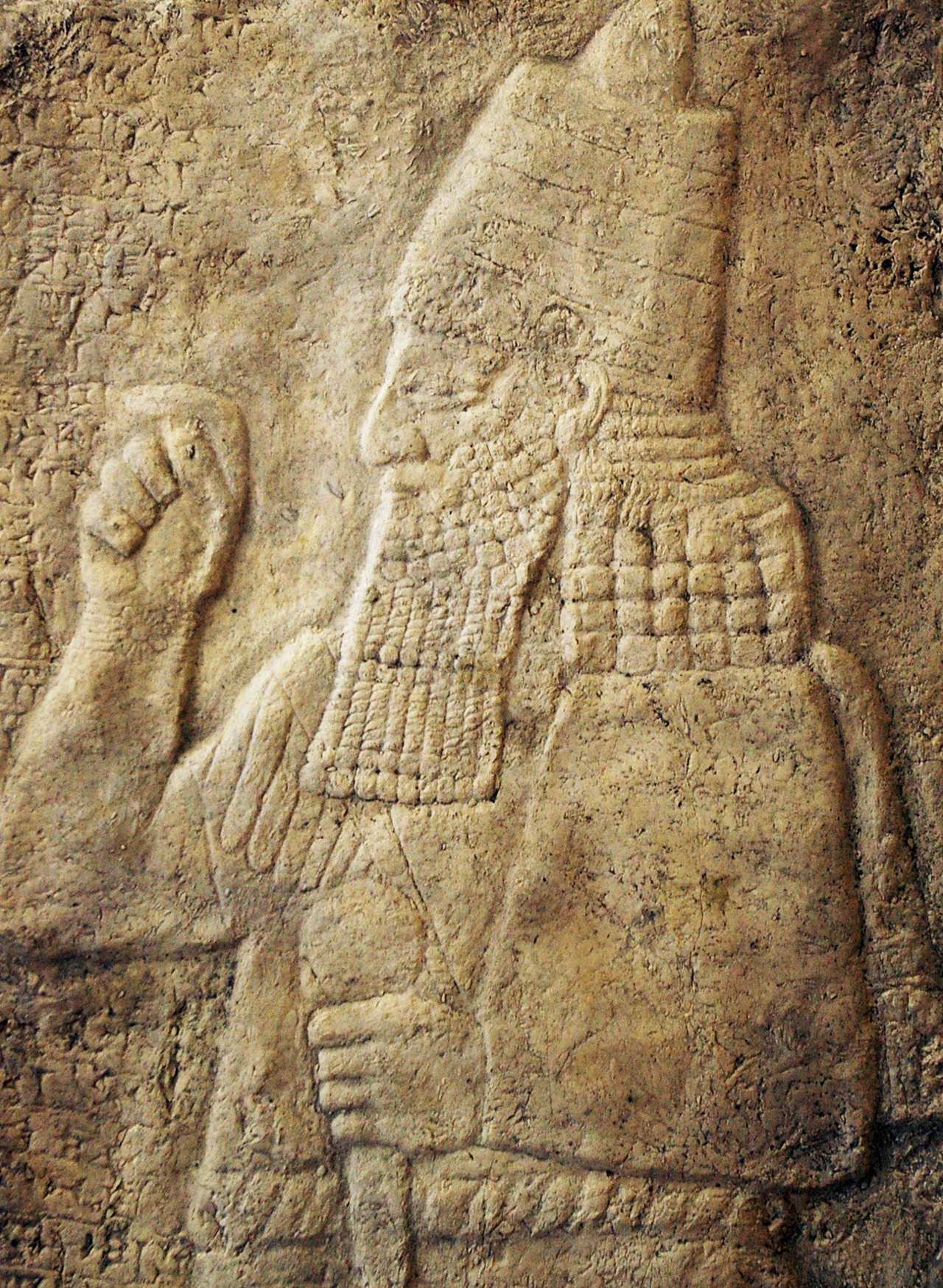
- Cast of a rock relief of Sennacherib from the foot of Mount Judi, near Cizre

King of the Neo-Assyrian Empire
- Reign: 705–681 BC
- Predecessor: Sargon II
- Successor: Esarhaddon
- Born: c. 745 BC; Nimrud (?)
- Died: 20 October 681 BC (aged c. 63/64); Nineveh
- Spouse: Tashmetu-sharrat; Naqi'a
- Issue among others: Ashur-nadin-shumi; Arda-Mulissu; Esarhaddon
- Akkadian: Sîn-ahhī-erība; Sîn-aḫḫē-erība
- Dynasty: Sargonid dynasty
- Father: Sargon II
- Mother: Ra'īmâ

Sennacherib (Neo-Assyrian Akkadian: 𒀭𒌍𒉽𒈨𒌍𒋢, romanized: Sîn-aḫḫī-erība or Sîn-aḫḫē-erība, meaning "Sîn has replaced the brothers") was the king of the Neo-Assyrian Empire from 705 BC until his assassination in 681 BC. The second king of the Sargonid dynasty, Sennacherib is one of the most famous Assyrian kings for the role he plays in the Hebrew Bible, which describes his campaign in the Levant. Other events of his reign include his destruction of the city of Babylon in 689 BC and his renovation and expansion of the last great Assyrian capital, Nineveh.

Although Sennacherib was one of the most powerful and wide-ranging Assyrian kings, he faced considerable difficulty in controlling Babylonia, which formed the southern portion of his empire. Many of Sennacherib's Babylonian troubles stemmed from the Chaldean tribal chief Marduk-apla-iddina II, who had been Babylon's king until Sennacherib's father defeated him. Shortly after Sennacherib inherited the throne in 705 BC, Marduk-apla-iddina retook Babylon and allied with the Elamites. Though Sennacherib reclaimed the south in 700 BC, Marduk-apla-iddina continued to trouble him, probably instigating Assyrian vassals in the Levant to rebel, leading to the Levantine War of 701 BC, and himself warring against Bel-ibni, Sennacherib's vassal king in Babylonia.

After the Babylonians and Elamites captured and executed Sennacherib's eldest son Aššur-nādin-šumi, whom Sennacherib had proclaimed as his new vassal king in Babylon, Sennacherib campaigned in both regions, subduing Elam. Because Babylon, well within his own territory, had been the target of most of his military campaigns and had caused the death of his son, he destroyed the city in 689 BC.

In the Levantine War, the states in the southern Levant, especially the Kingdom of Judah under King Hezekiah, were not subdued as easily as those in the north. The Assyrians thus invaded Judah. Though the biblical narrative holds that divine intervention by an angel ended the Assyrian siege of Jerusalem by destroying the Assyrian army, an outright defeat is unlikely as Hezekiah submitted to Sennacherib at the end of the campaign. Contemporary records, even those written by Assyria's enemies, do not mention the Assyrians being defeated at Jerusalem. However, the siege remained at least inconclusive, and the Greek historian Herodotus stated that the Assyrians failed in this.

Sennacherib transferred the capital of Assyria to Nineveh, where he had spent most of his time as crown prince. To transform Nineveh into a capital worthy of his empire, he launched one of the most ambitious building projects in ancient history. He expanded the size of the city and constructed great city walls, numerous temples and a royal garden. His most famous work in the city is the Southwest Palace, which Sennacherib named his "Palace without Rival".

After the death of his eldest son and crown prince Aššur-nādin-šumi, Sennacherib originally designated his second son Arda-Mulissu heir. He later replaced him with a younger son, Esarhaddon, in 684 BC, for unknown reasons. Sennacherib ignored Arda-Mulissu's repeated appeals to be reinstated as heir, and in 681 BC, Arda-Mulissu and his brother Nabu-shar-usur murdered Sennacherib, (Note: The overwhelming majority of scholars accept Arda-Mulissu's guilt as a matter of fact. Other hypotheses have at time been proposed, such as that the crime was committed by some unknown Babylonian sympathizer or even by Esarhaddon himself. In 2020, Andrew Knapp suggested that Esarhaddon might actually have been behind the murder, citing alleged inconsistencies in the account of Arda-Mulissu's guilt, that Esarhaddon might also had a difficult relationship with Sennacherib, the speed in which Esarhaddon assembled an army and defeated his brothers, and other circumstantial evidence. However, Christopher W. Jones reviewed the question in 2023 and concluded that the evidence supported the conventional view that Arda-Mulissu orchestrated Sennacherib's murder.) hoping to seize power for themselves. Babylonia and the Levant welcomed his death as divine punishment, while the Assyrian heartland probably reacted with resentment and horror. Arda-Mulissu's coronation was postponed, and Esarhaddon raised an army and seized Nineveh, installing himself as king as intended by Sennacherib.

== Early life ==
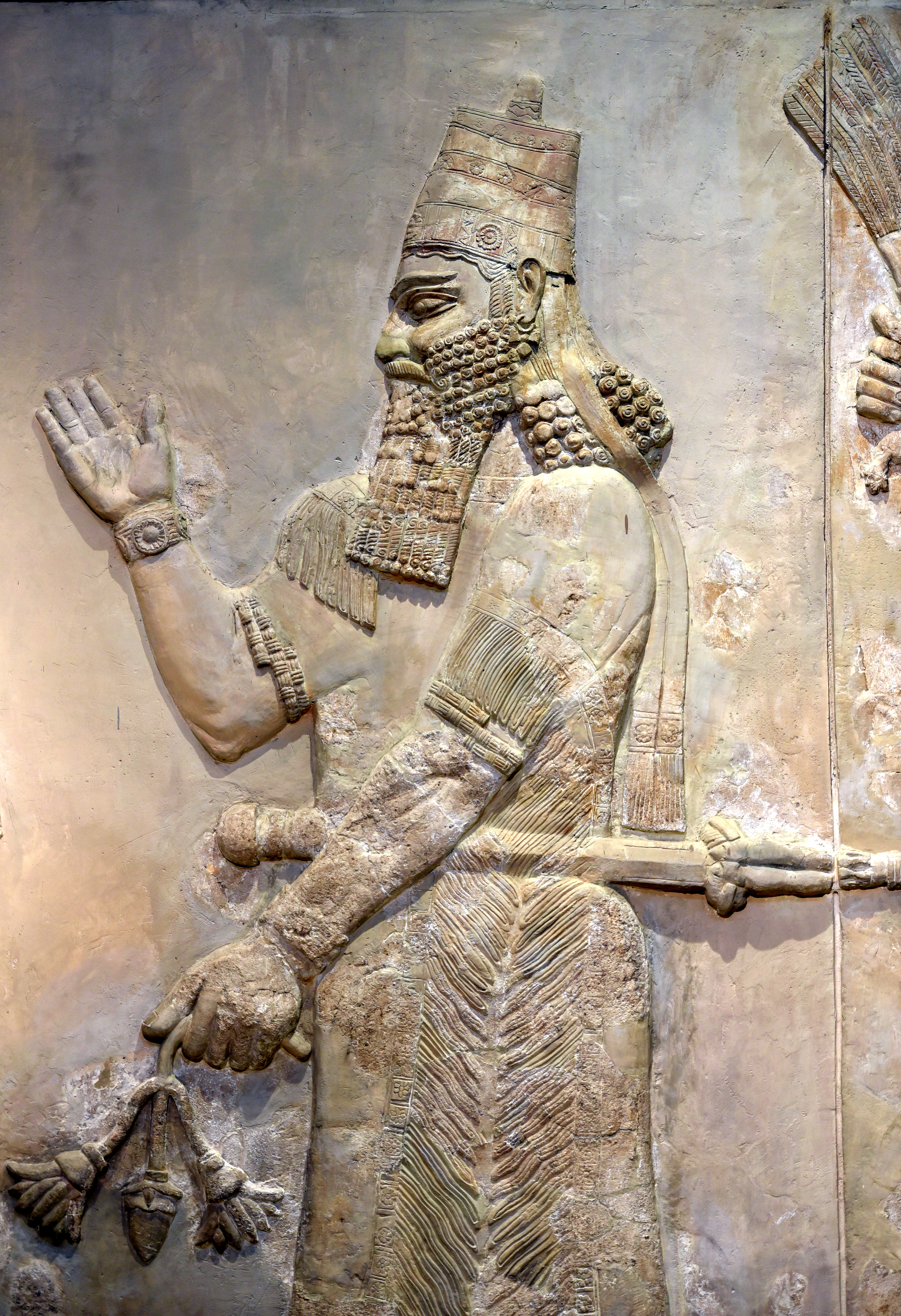
Bas-relief depicting Sargon II, Sennacherib's father and predecessor

Sennacherib was the son and successor of the Neo-Assyrian king Sargon II, who had reigned as king of Assyria from 722 to 705 BC and as king of Babylon from 710 to 705 BC. The identity of Sennacherib's mother is uncertain. Historically, the most popular view has been that Sennacherib was the son of Sargon's wife Ataliya, although this is now considered unlikely. To have been Sennacherib's mother, Ataliya would have had to be born around the year 760 BC, at the latest, and lived to at least 692 BC, as a "queen mother" is attested in that year, but Ataliya's grave at Nimrud, which was discovered in the 1980s, indicates she was 35 years old at most when she died. The Assyriologist Josette Elayi considers it more plausible Sennacherib's mother was another of Sargon's wives, Ra'īmâ; a stele from Assur (once the capital of Assyria), discovered in 1913, specifically refers to her as the "mother of Sennacherib". Ra'īmâ's existence is a recent discovery, based on a 2014 reading of the inscription on the stele. Sargon claimed he was himself the son of the earlier king Tiglath-Pileser III, but this is uncertain as Sargon usurped the throne from Tiglath-Pileser's other son Shalmaneser V.

Sennacherib was probably born c. 745 BC in Nimrud. If Sargon was the son of Tiglath-Pileser and not a non-dynastic usurper, Sennacherib would have grown up in the royal palace at Nimrud and spent most of his youth there. Sargon continued to live in Nimrud long after he had become king, leaving the city in 710 BC to reside at Babylon, and later at his new capital, Dur-Sharrukin, in 706 BC. By the time Sargon moved to Babylon, Sennacherib, who served as the crown prince and designated heir, had already left Nimrud, living in a residence at Nineveh. Nineveh had been the designated seat of the Assyrian crown prince since the reign of Tiglath-Pileser. As crown prince, Sennacherib also owned an estate at Tarbiṣu. The royal educator, Hunnî, would have educated Sennacherib and his siblings. They probably received a scribal education, learning arithmetic and how to read and write in Sumerian and Akkadian.

Sennacherib had several brothers and at least one sister. In addition to the older brothers who died before his birth, Sennacherib had a number of younger brothers, some of whom are mentioned as being alive as late as 670 BC, then in the service of Sennacherib's son and successor Esarhaddon. Sennacherib's only known sister, Ahat-abisha, was married off to Ambaris, the king of Tabal, but probably returned to Assyria after Sargon's first successful campaign against Tabal.

Sennacherib's name, Sîn-aḫḫē-erība, means "Sîn (the moon-god) has replaced the brothers" in Akkadian. The name probably derives from Sennacherib not being Sargon's first son, but all his older brothers being dead by the time he was born. In Hebrew, his name was rendered as Snḥryb and in Aramaic it was Šnḥ’ryb. According to a 670 BC document, it was illegal to give the name Sennacherib (then the former king) to a commoner in Assyria, as it was considered sacrilege.

== As crown prince ==
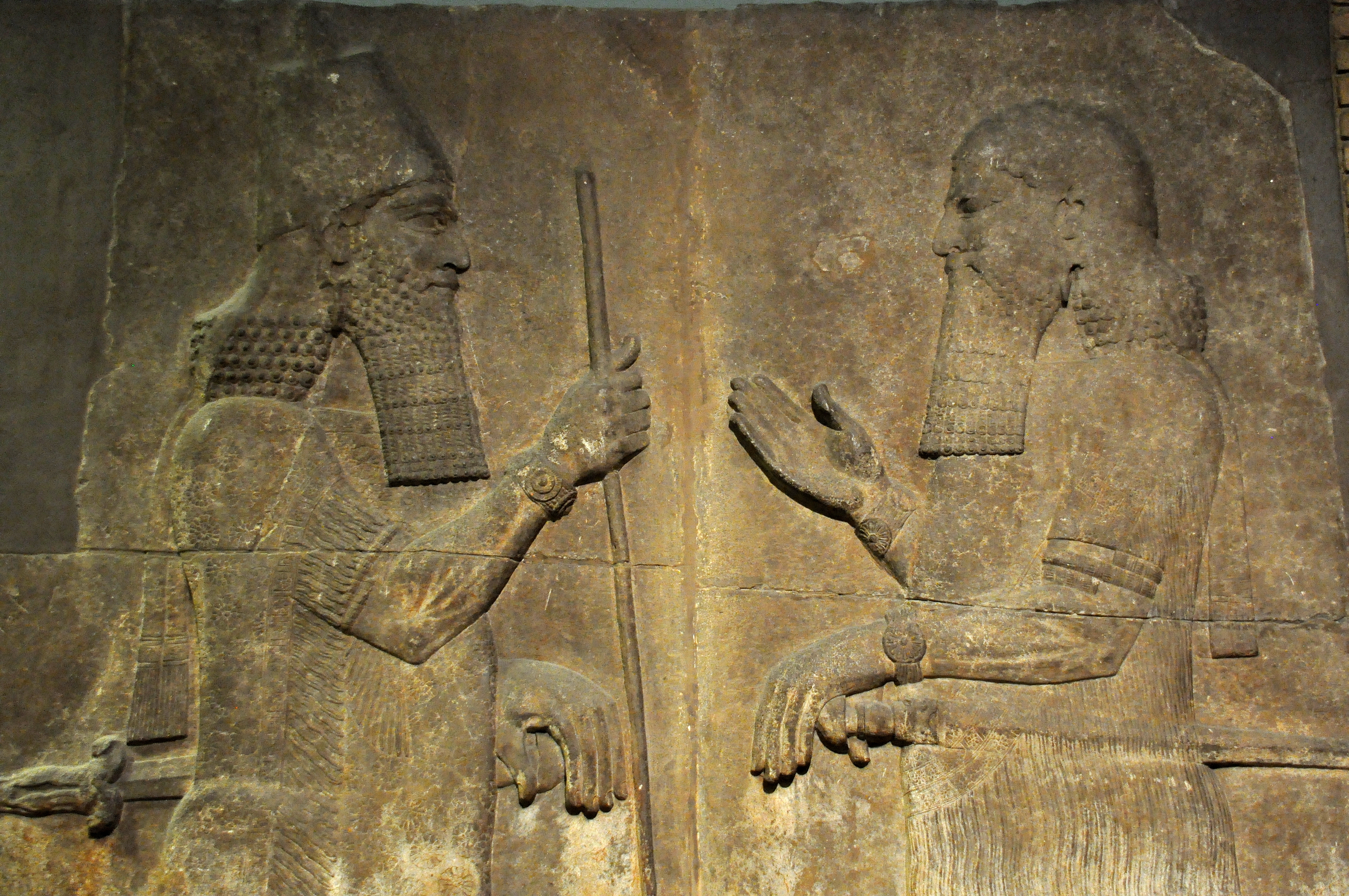
Sennacherib's father Sargon II (left) facing a high-ranking official, possibly his crown prince Sennacherib

As crown prince, Sennacherib exercised royal power with his father, or alone as a substitute while Sargon was away campaigning. During Sargon's longer absences from the Assyrian heartland, Sennacherib's residence would have served as the center of government in the Neo-Assyrian Empire, with the crown prince taking on significant administrative and political responsibilities. The vast responsibilities entrusted to Sennacherib suggests a certain degree of trust between the king and the crown prince. In reliefs depicting both Sargon and Sennacherib, they are portrayed in discussion, appearing almost as equals. As regent, Sennacherib's primary duty was to maintain relations with Assyrian governors and generals and oversee the empire's vast military intelligence network. Sennacherib oversaw domestic affairs and often informed Sargon of the progress being made on building projects throughout the empire. Sargon also assigned him to the reception and distribution of audience gifts and tribute. After distributing such financial resources, Sennacherib sent letters to his father to inform him of his decisions.

A letter to his father indicates that Sennacherib respected him and that they were on friendly terms. He never disobeyed his father, and his letters indicate he knew Sargon well and wanted to please him. For unknown reasons, Sargon never took him on his military campaigns. Elayi believes that Sennacherib may have resented his father for this as he missed out on the glory attached to military victories. In any event, Sennacherib never took action against Sargon or attempted to usurp the throne despite being more than old enough to become king himself.

== Assyria and Babylonia ==
Map of the Near East in 900 BC, on the eve of the Neo-Assyrian Empire's rise. The map shows the former core territories of Assyria (Aššur) and Babylonia.

By the time Sennacherib became king, the Neo-Assyrian Empire had been the dominant power in the Near East for over thirty years, chiefly due to its well-trained and large army, superior to that of any other contemporary kingdom. Though Babylonia to the south had also once been a large kingdom, it was typically weaker than its northern neighbor during this period, due to internal divisions and the lack of a well-organized army. The population of Babylonia was divided into various ethnic groups with different priorities and ideals. Though old native Babylonians ruled most of the cities, such as Kish, Ur, Uruk, Borsippa, Nippur, and Babylon itself, Chaldean tribes led by chieftains who often squabbled with each other dominated most of the southernmost land. The Arameans lived on the fringes of settled land and were notorious for plundering surrounding territories. Because of the infighting of these three major groups, Babylonia often represented an appealing target for Assyrian campaigns. The two kingdoms had competed since the rise of the Middle Assyrian Empire in the 14th century BC, and in the 8th century BC, the Assyrians consistently gained the upper hand. Babylon's internal and external weakness led to its conquest by the Assyrian king Tiglath-Pileser III in 729 BC.

During the expansion of Assyria into a major empire, the Assyrians had conquered various neighboring kingdoms, either annexing them as Assyrian provinces or turning them into vassal states. Because the Assyrians venerated the long history and culture of Babylon, it was preserved as a full kingdom, either ruled by an appointed client king, or by the Assyrian king in a personal union. The relationship between Assyria and Babylonia was similar to the relationship between Greece and Rome in later centuries; much of Assyria's culture, texts and traditions had been imported from the south. Assyria and Babylonia also shared the same language (Akkadian). The relationship between Assyria and Babylon was emotional in a sense; Neo-Assyrian inscriptions implicitly gender the two countries, calling Assyria the metaphorical "husband" and Babylon its "wife". In the words of the Assyriologist Eckart Frahm, "the Assyrians were in love with Babylon, but also wished to dominate her". Though Babylon was respected as the well-spring of civilization, it was expected to remain passive in political matters, something that Assyria's "Babylonian bride" repeatedly refused to be.

== Reign ==
=== Death of Sargon II and succession ===
Map of the Near East in 700 BC, showing the extent of the Neo-Assyrian Empire (Aššur)

In 705 BC, Sargon, probably in his sixties, led the Assyrian army on a campaign against King Gurdî of Tabal in central Anatolia. The campaign was disastrous, resulting in the defeat of the Assyrian army and the death of Sargon, whose corpse the Anatolians carried off. Sargon's death made the defeat significantly worse because the Assyrians believed the gods had punished him for some major past misdeed. In Mesopotamian mythology, the afterlife suffered by those who died in battle and were not buried was terrible, being doomed to suffer like beggars for eternity. Sennacherib was about 35 years old when he ascended to the Assyrian throne in August of 705 BC. He had a great deal of experience with how to rule the empire because of his long tenure as crown prince. His reaction to his father's fate was to distance himself from Sargon. Frahm characterized Sennacherib's reaction as "one of almost complete denial", writing that Sennacherib "apparently felt unable to acknowledge and mentally deal with what had happened to Sargon". Sennacherib immediately abandoned Sargon's great new capital city, Dur-Sharrukin, and moved the capital to Nineveh instead. One of Sennacherib's first actions as king was to rebuild a temple dedicated to the god Nergal, associated with death, disaster and war, at the city of Tarbiṣu.

Even with this public denial in mind, Sennacherib was superstitious and spent a great deal of time asking his diviners what sort of offense Sargon could have committed to suffer the fate that he had, perhaps considering the possibility that he had offended Babylon's deities by taking control of the city. A text, though probably written after Sennacherib's death, says he proclaimed he was investigating the nature of a sin committed by his father. A minor 704 BC campaign (unmentioned in Sennacherib's later historical accounts), led by Sennacherib's magnates rather than the king himself, was sent against Gurdî in Tabal to avenge Sargon. Sennacherib spent much time and effort to rid the empire of Sargon's imagery. Raising the level of the courtyard made images that Sargon had created at the temple in Assur invisible. When Sargon's wife Ataliya died, she was buried hastily and in the same coffin as another woman, the queen of the previous king Tiglath-Pileser. Sargon is never mentioned in Sennacherib's inscriptions.

=== First Babylonian campaign ===
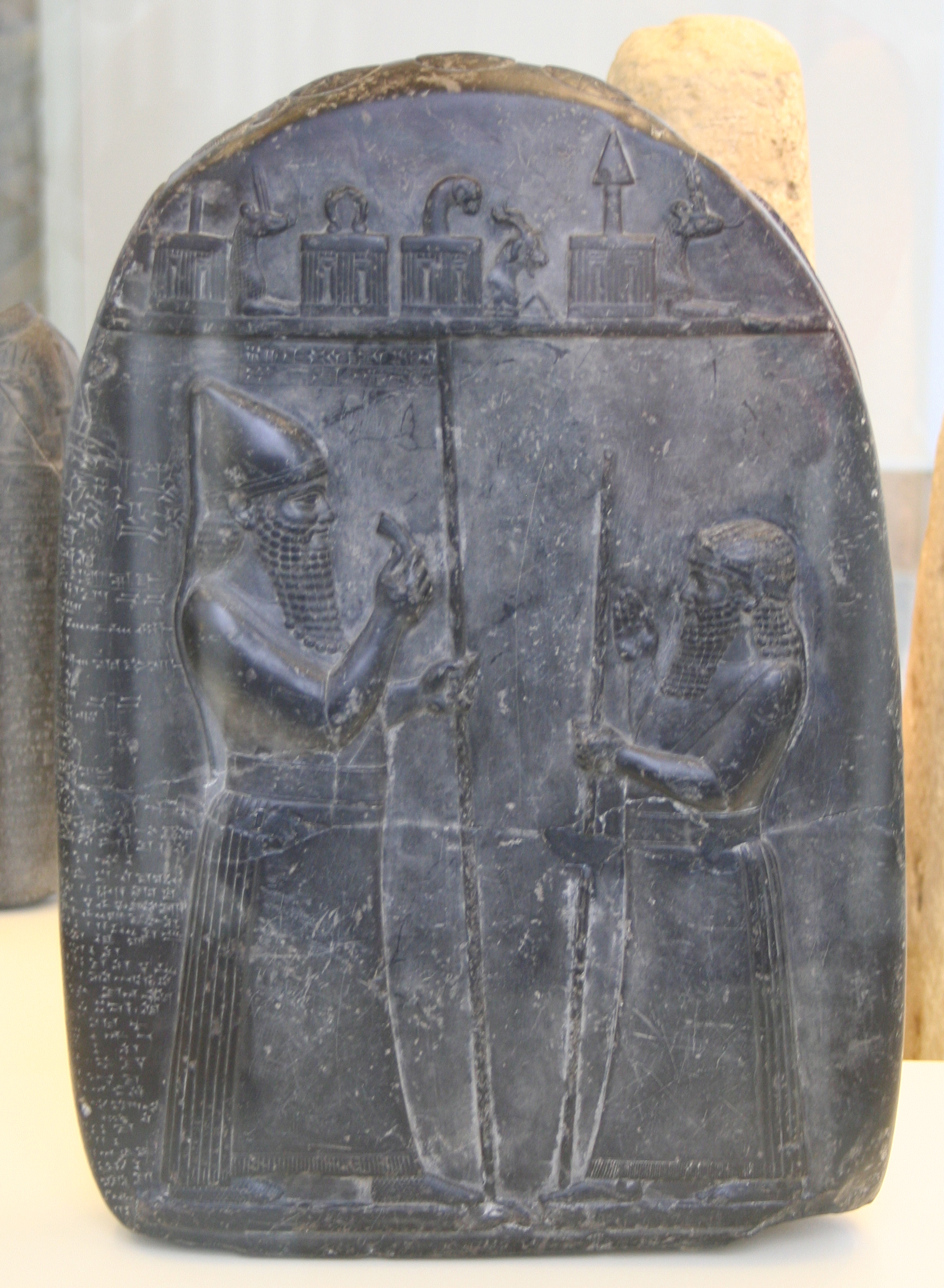
Depiction of Sennacherib's arch-enemy Marduk-apla-iddina II (left), king of Babylon 722–710 BC and 704/703–703 BC and the instigator of many of Sennacherib's later conflicts

Sargon II's death in the battle and the disappearance of his body inspired rebellions across the Assyrian Empire. Sargon had ruled Babylonia since 710 BC, when he defeated the Chaldean tribal chief Marduk-apla-iddina II, who had taken control of the south in the aftermath of the death of Sargon's predecessor Shalmaneser V in 722 BC. Like his immediate predecessors, Sennacherib took the ruling titles of both Assyria and Babylonia when he became king, but his reign in Babylonia was less stable. Unlike Sargon and previous Babylonian rulers, who had proclaimed themselves as shakkanakku (viceroys) of Babylon, in reverence for the city's deity Marduk (who was considered Babylon's formal "king"), Sennacherib explicitly proclaimed himself as Babylon's king. Furthermore, he did not "take the hand" of the Statue of Marduk, the physical representation of the deity, and thus did not honor the god by undergoing the traditional Babylonian coronation ritual.

In angry response to this disrespect, revolts a month apart in 704 or 703 BC overthrew Sennacherib's rule in the south. First, a Babylonian by the name of Marduk-zakir-shumi II took the throne, but Marduk-apla-iddina, the same Chaldean warlord who had seized control of the city once before and had warred against Sennacherib's father, deposed him after just two or four weeks. Marduk-apla-iddina rallied large portions of Babylonia's people to fight for him, both the urban Babylonians and the tribal Chaldeans, and he also enlisted troops from the neighboring civilization of Elam, in modern-day south-western Iran. Though assembling all these forces took time, Sennacherib reacted slowly to these developments, which allowed Marduk-apla-iddina to station large contingents at the cities of Kutha and Kish.

Portions of the Assyrian army were away in Tabal in 704 BC. Because Sennacherib might have considered a two-front war too risky, Marduk-apla-iddina was left unchallenged for several months. In 703 BC, after the Tabal expedition had been completed, Sennacherib gathered the Assyrian army at Assur, often used as a mustering spot for campaigns against the south. The Assyrian army, led by Sennacherib's chief commander, launched an unsuccessful attack on the coalition forces near the city of Kish, bolstering the legitimacy of the coalition. However, Sennacherib also realized that the anti-Assyrian forces were divided and led his entire army to engage and destroy the portion of the army encamped at Kutha. Thereafter, he moved to attack the contingent at Kish, winning this second battle as well. Fearing for his life, Marduk-apla-iddina had already fled the battlefield. Sennacherib's inscriptions state that among the captives taken after the victory was a stepson of Marduk-apla-iddina and brother of an Arab queen, Yatie, who had joined the coalition.

Sennacherib then marched on Babylon. As the Assyrians appeared on the horizon, Babylon opened its gates to him, surrendering without a fight. The city was reprimanded, suffering a minor sack, though its citizens were unharmed. After a brief period of rest in Babylon, Sennacherib and the Assyrian army then moved systematically through southern Babylonia, where there was still organized resistance, pacifying both the tribal areas and the major cities. Sennacherib's inscriptions state that over two hundred thousand prisoners were taken. Because his previous policy of reigning as king of both Assyria and Babylonia had evidently failed, Sennacherib attempted another method, appointing a native Babylonian who had grown up at the Assyrian court, Bel-ibni, as his vassal king of the south. Sennacherib described Bel-ibni as "a native of Babylon who grew up in my palace like a young puppy".

=== War in the Levant ===
Scenes from Sennacherib's Lachish reliefs

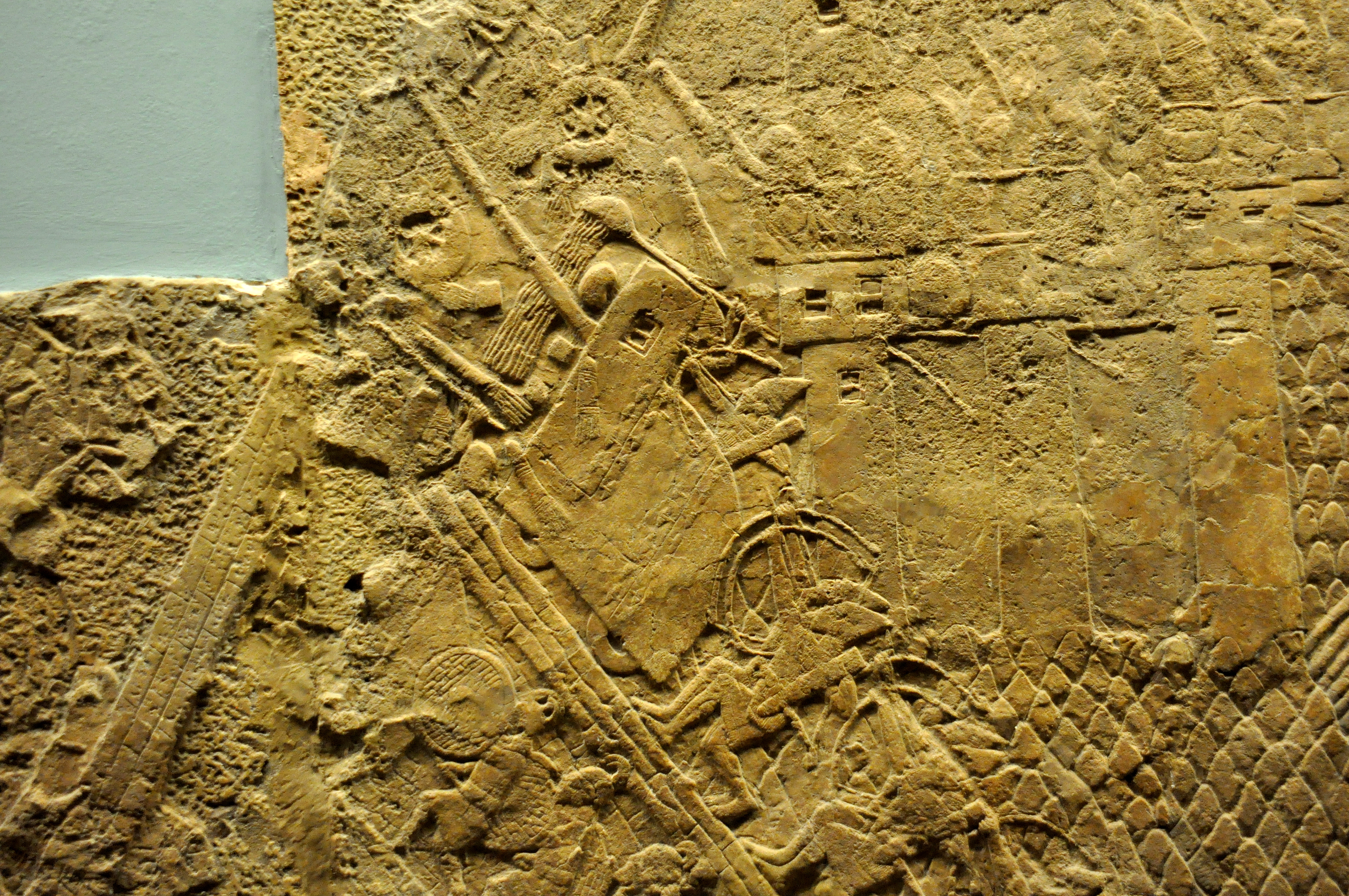
Assyrian siege engine attacking the city wall of Lachish

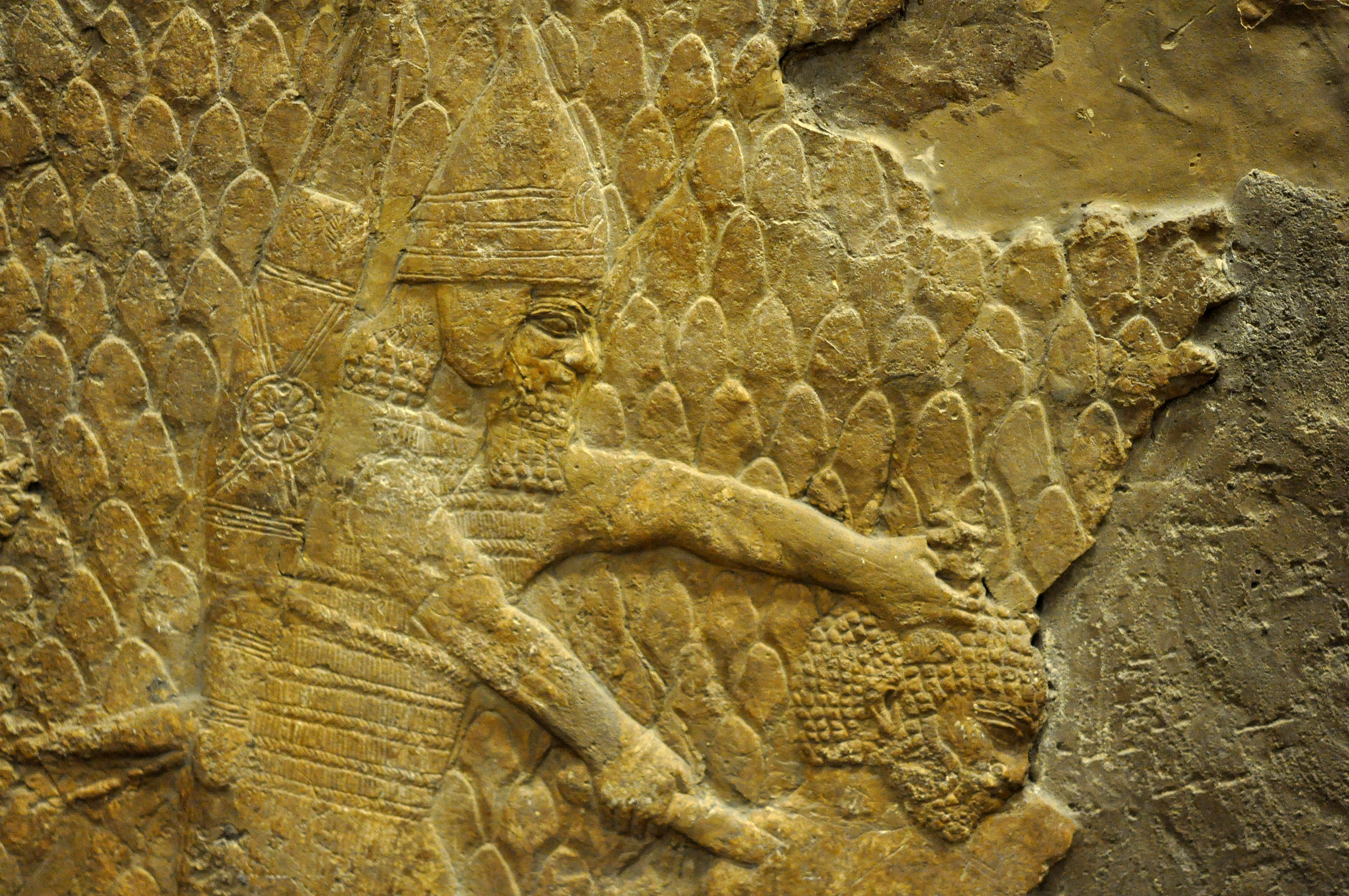
Assyrian soldier about to behead a prisoner from Lachish

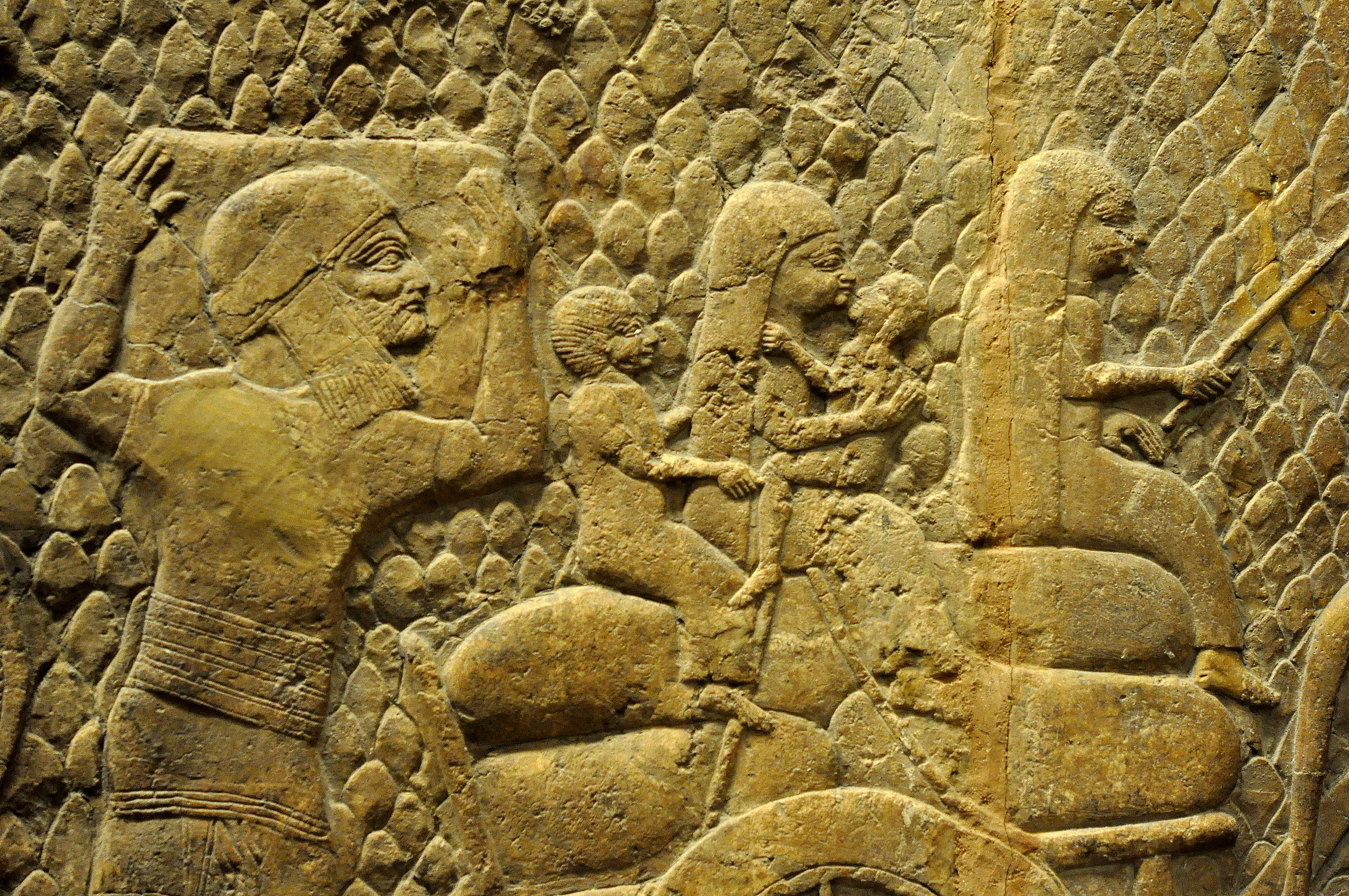
Judean people being deported into exile after the fall of Lachish to the Assyrians

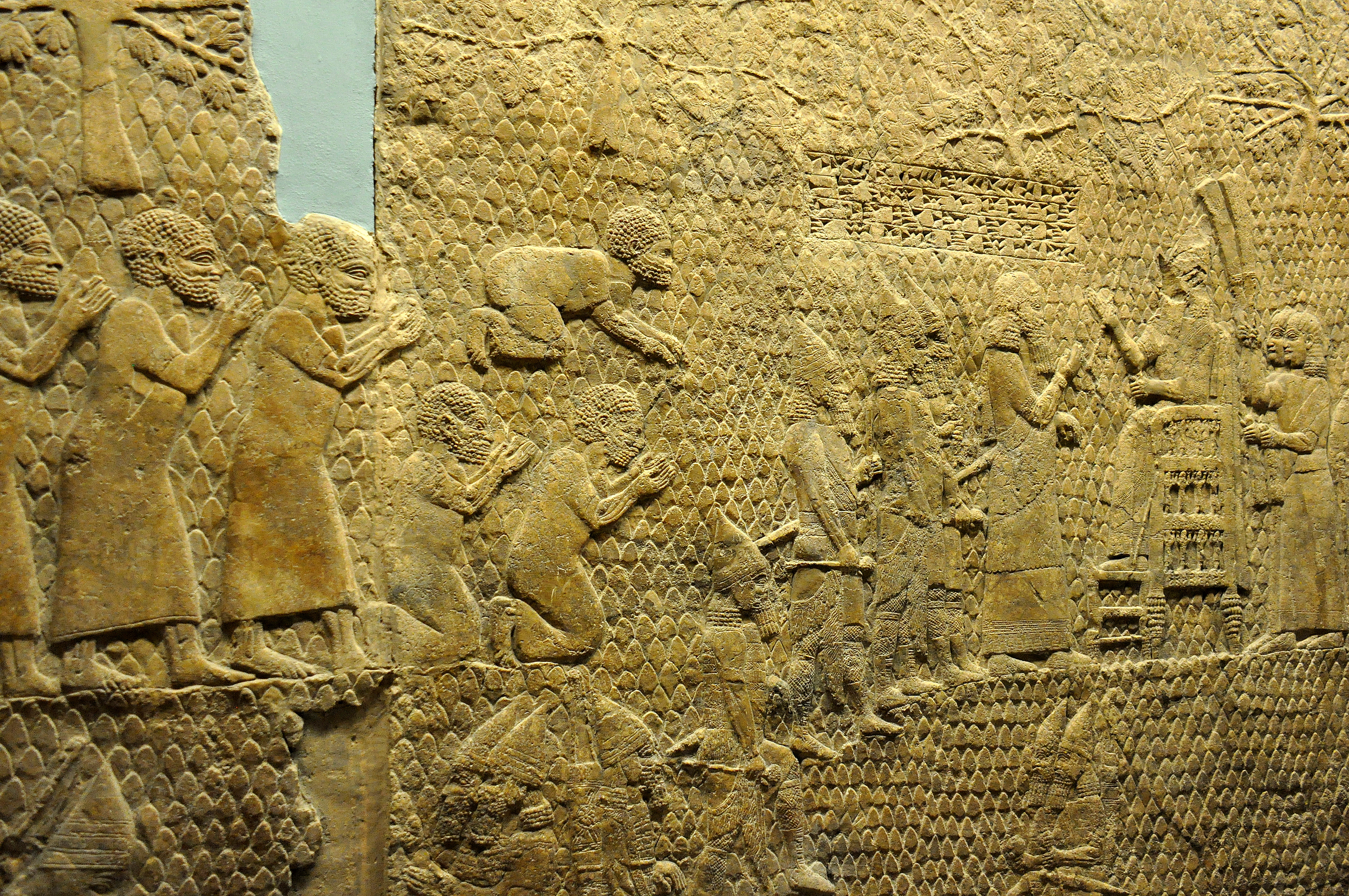
Sennacherib (enthroned at the far right) at Lachish, interacting with his officials and reviewing prisoners

After the Babylonian war, Sennacherib's second campaign was in the Zagros Mountains. There, he subdued the Yasubigallians, a people from east of the Tigris river, and the Kassites, a people who had ruled Babylonia centuries before. Sennacherib's third campaign, directed against the kingdoms and city-states in the Levant, is very well-documented compared to many other events in the ancient Near East and is the best-documented event in the history of Israel during the First Temple period. In 705 BC, Hezekiah, the king of Judah, had stopped paying his annual tribute to the Assyrians and began pursuing a markedly aggressive foreign policy, probably inspired by the recent wave of anti-Assyrian rebellions across the empire. After conspiring with Egypt (then under Kushite rule) and Sidqia, an anti-Assyrian king of the city of Ashkelon, to garner support, Hezekiah attacked Philistine cities loyal to Assyria and captured the Assyrian vassal Padi, king of Ekron, and imprisoned him in his capital, Jerusalem. In the northern Levant, former Assyrian vassal cities rallied around Luli, the king of Tyre and Sidon. Sennacherib's arch-enemy Marduk-apla-iddina encouraged the anti-Assyrian sentiment among some of the empire's western vassals. He corresponded with and sent gifts to western rulers like Hezekiah, probably hoping to assemble a vast anti-Assyrian alliance.

In 701 BC, Sennacherib first moved to attack the Neo-Hittite and Phoenician cities in the north. Like many rulers of these cities had done before and would do again, Luli fled rather than face the wrath of the Assyrians, escaping by boat until he was beyond Sennacherib's reach. In his stead, Sennacherib proclaimed a noble by the name Ethbaal as the new king of Sidon and his vassal and oversaw the submission of many of the surrounding cities to his rule. Faced with a massive Assyrian army nearby, many of the Levantine rulers, including Budu-ilu of Ammon, Kammusu-nadbi of Moab, Mitinti of Ashdod and Aya-ramu of Edom, quickly submitted to Sennacherib to avoid retribution.

The resistance in the southern Levant was not as easily suppressed, forcing Sennacherib to invade the region. The Assyrians began by taking Ashkelon and defeating Sidqia. They then besieged and took numerous cities, including Beth-Dagon, Joppa, Banai-Barqa, and Azjuru. As the Assyrians were preparing to retake Ekron, Hezekiah's ally, Egypt, intervened in the conflict. The Assyrians defeated the Egyptian expedition in a battle near the city of Eltekeh. They took the cities of Ekron and Timnah and Judah stood alone, with Sennacherib setting his sights on Jerusalem. While a portion of Sennacherib's troops prepared to blockade Jerusalem, Sennacherib himself marched on the important Judean city of Lachish. Both the blockade of Jerusalem and the siege of Lachish probably prevented further Egyptian aid from reaching Hezekiah, and intimidated the kings of other smaller states in the region. The siege of Lachish, which ended in the city's destruction, was so lengthy that the defenders eventually began using arrowheads made of bone rather than metal, which had run out. To take the city, the Assyrians constructed a great siege mound, a ramp made of earth and stone, to reach the top of Lachish's walls. After they had destroyed the city, the Assyrians deported the survivors to the Assyrian Empire, forcing some of them to work on Sennacherib's building projects, and others to serve in the king's personal guard.

=== Sennacherib at the gates of Jerusalem ===
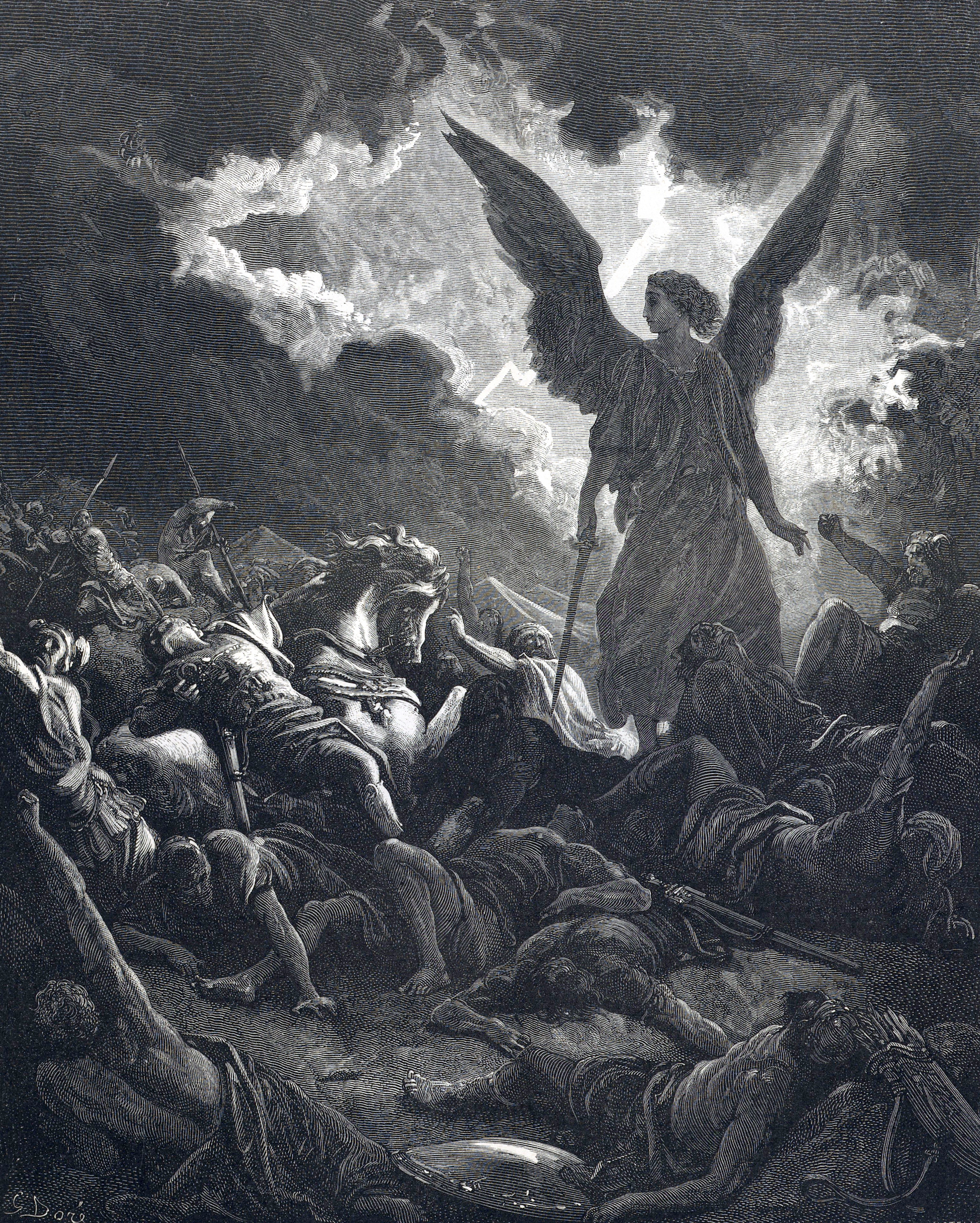
19th-century wood engraving by Gustave Doré depicting the Biblical narrative of an angel destroying Sennacherib's army outside Jerusalem

Sennacherib's account of what happened at Jerusalem begins with "As for Hezekiah ... like a caged bird I shut up in Jerusalem his royal city. I barricaded him with outposts, and exit from the gate of his city I made taboo for him." Thus, Jerusalem was blockaded in some capacity, though the lack of massive military activities and appropriate equipment meant that it was probably not a full siege. According to the Biblical narrative, a senior Assyrian official with the title Rabshakeh stood in front of the city's walls and demanded its surrender, threatening that the Judeans would 'eat feces and drink urine' during the siege. Although the Assyrian account of the operation may lead one to believe that Sennacherib was present in person, this is never explicitly stated and reliefs depicting the campaign show Sennacherib seated on a throne in Lachish instead of overseeing the preparations for an assault on Jerusalem. According to the biblical account, the Assyrian envoys to Hezekiah returned to Sennacherib to find him engaged in a struggle with the city of Libnah.

The account of the blockade erected around Jerusalem is different from the sieges described in Sennacherib's annals and the massive reliefs in Sennacherib's palace at Nineveh, which depict the successful siege of Lachish rather than events at Jerusalem. Though the blockade of Jerusalem was not a proper siege, it is clear from all available sources that a massive Assyrian army was encamped in the city's vicinity, probably on its northern side. Though it is clear that the blockade of Jerusalem ended without significant fighting, how it was resolved and what stopped Sennacherib's massive army from overwhelming the city is uncertain. The Biblical account of the end of Sennacherib's attack on Jerusalem holds that though Hezekiah's soldiers manned the walls of the city, ready to defend it against the Assyrians, an entity referred to as the destroying angel, sent by Yahweh, annihilated Sennacherib's army, killing 185,000 Assyrian soldiers in front of Jerusalem's gates. The ancient Greek historian Herodotus describes the operation as an Assyrian failure due to a "multitude of field-mice" descending upon the Assyrian camp, devouring crucial material such as quivers and bowstrings, leaving the Assyrians unarmed and causing them to flee. It is possible that the story of the mice infestation is an allusion to some kind of disease striking the Assyrian camp, possibly the septicemic plague. An alternative hypothesis, first advanced by journalist Henry T. Aubin in 2001, is that the blockade of Jerusalem was lifted through the intervention of a Kushite army from Egypt. The battle with the Egyptians is considered unlikely to have been an outright Assyrian defeat, especially because contemporary Babylonian chronicles, otherwise eager to mention Assyrian failures, are silent on the matter.

Despite the seemingly inconclusive end to the blockade of Jerusalem, the Levantine campaign was largely an Assyrian victory. After the Assyrians had seized many of Judah's most important fortified cities and destroyed several towns and villages, Hezekiah realized that his anti-Assyrian activities had been disastrous military and political miscalculations and accordingly submitted to the Assyrians once more. He was forced to pay a heavier tribute than previously, probably along with a heavy penalty and the tribute that he had failed to send to Nineveh from 705 to 701 BC. He was also forced to release the imprisoned king of Ekron, Padi, and Sennacherib granted substantial portions of Judah's land to the neighboring kingdoms of Gaza, Ashdod and Ekron.

=== Resolving the Babylonian problem ===
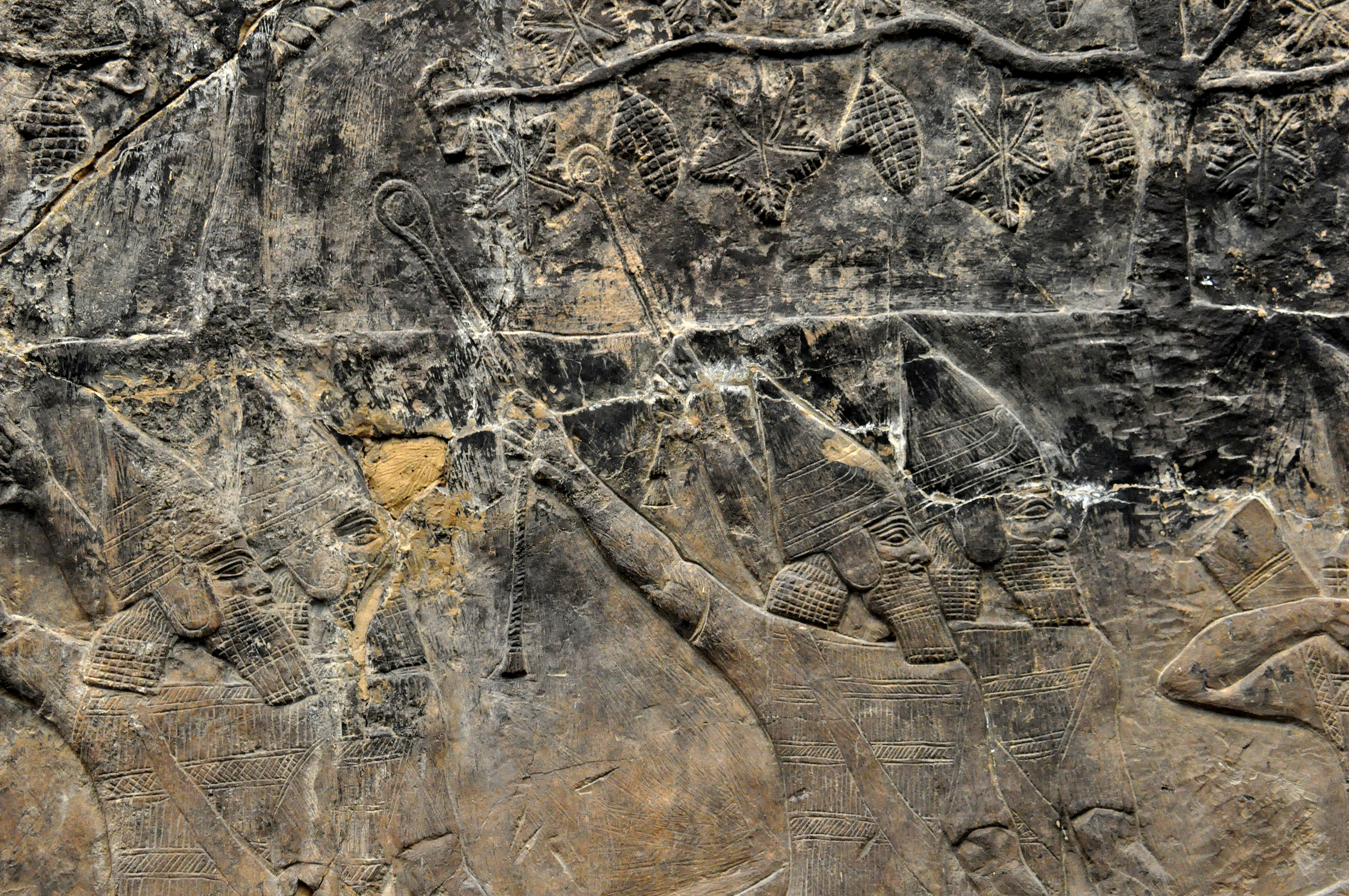
Relief from Sennacherib's reign depicting Assyrian slingers hurling stones at an enemy city

By 700 BC, the situation in Babylonia had once again deteriorated to such an extent that Sennacherib had to invade and reassert his control. Bel-ibni now faced the open revolts of two tribal leaders: Shuzubu (who later became Babylonian king under the name Mushezib-Marduk) and Marduk-apla-iddina, now an elderly man. One of Sennacherib's first measures was to remove Bel-ibni from the Babylonian throne, either because of incompetence or complicity, and he was brought back to Assyria, whereafter he is not heard of again in the sources. The Assyrians searched the northern marshes of Babylonia in an attempt to find and capture Shuzubu, but they failed. Sennacherib then hunted for Marduk-apla-iddina, a hunt so intense the Chaldean escaped on boats with his people across the Persian Gulf, taking refuge in the Elamite city of Nagitu. Victorious, Sennacherib attempted yet another method to govern Babylonia and appointed his son Ashur-nadin-shumi to reign as Babylonian vassal king.

Ashur-nadin-shumi was also titled māru rēštû, a title that could be interpreted either as the "pre-eminent son" or the "firstborn son". His appointment as king of Babylon and the new title suggests that Ashur-nadin-shumi was being groomed to succeed Sennacherib as the king of Assyria upon his death. If māru rēštû means "pre-eminent" such a title would befit only the crown prince, and if it means "firstborn", this also suggests that Ashur-nadin-shumi was the heir. In most cases the Assyrians followed the principle of primogeniture, wherein the oldest son inherits. More evidence in favor of Ashur-nadin-shumi being the crown prince is Sennacherib's construction of a palace for him at the city of Assur, something Sennacherib would also do for the later crown prince Esarhaddon. As an Assyrian king of Babylon, Ashur-nadin-shumi's position was politically important and highly delicate and would have granted him valuable experience as the intended heir to the entire Neo-Assyrian Empire.

In the years that followed, Babylonia stayed relatively quiet, with no chronicles recording any significant activity. In the meantime, Sennacherib campaigned elsewhere. His fifth campaign in 699 BC involved a series of raids against the villages around the foot of Mount Judi, located to the northeast of Nineveh. Sennacherib's generals led other small campaigns without the king present, including a 698 BC expedition against Kirua, an Assyrian governor revolting in Cilicia, and a 695 BC campaign against the city of Tegarama. In 694 BC, Sennacherib invaded Elam, with the explicit goal of the campaign being to root out Marduk-apla-iddina and the other Chaldean refugees.

=== Elamite campaign and revenge ===
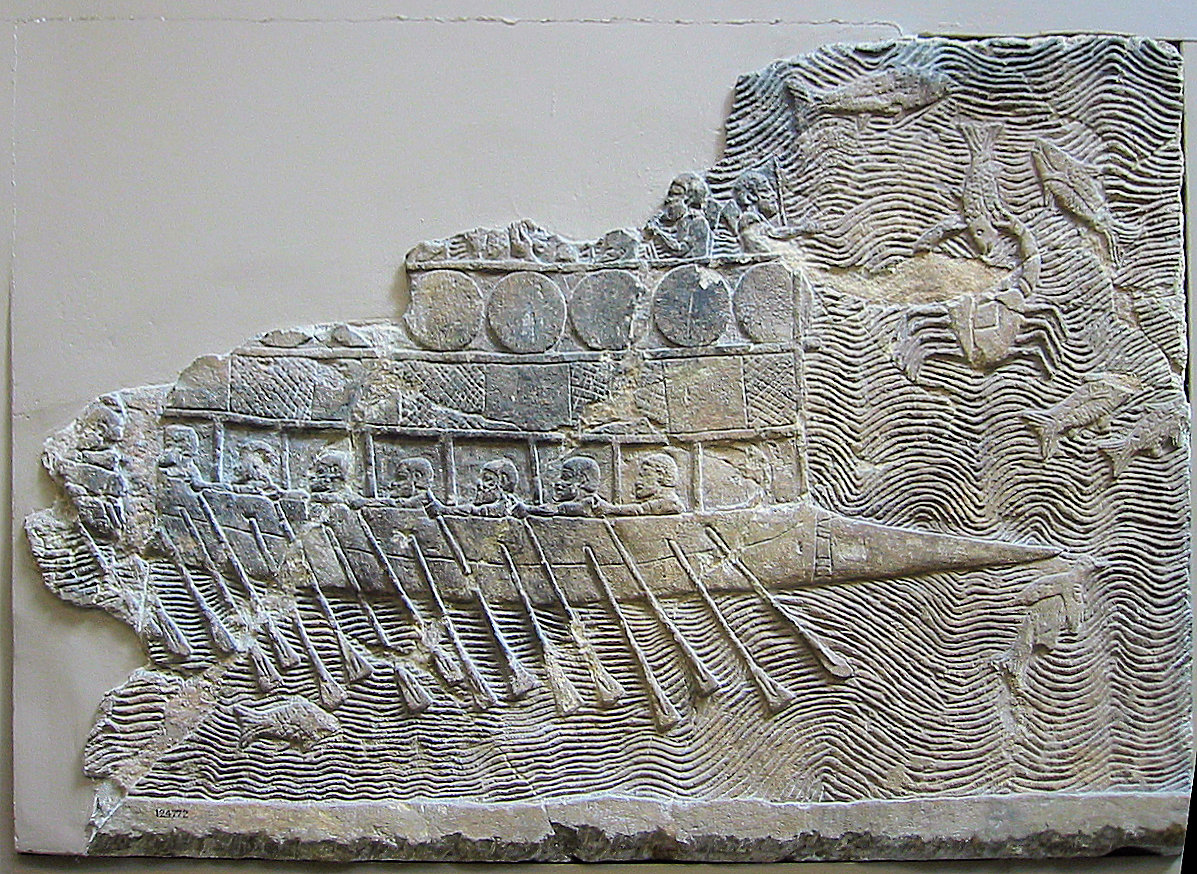
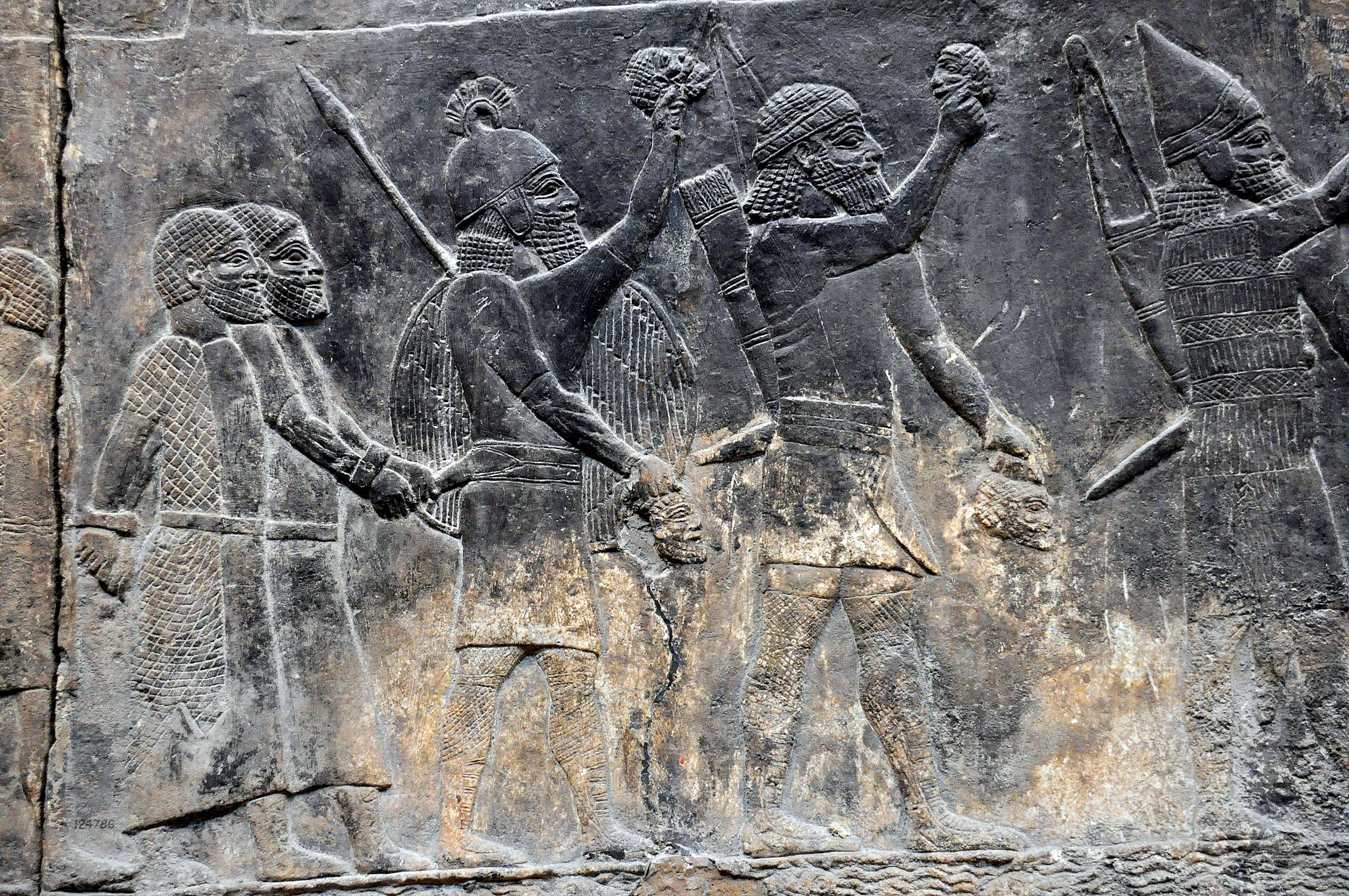
Reliefs from Sennacherib's time depicting an Assyrian warship (top) and a number of his soldiers along with their prisoners and war trophies (bottom)

In preparation for his attack on Elam, Sennacherib assembled two great fleets on the Euphrates and the Tigris. The latter fleet was then used to transport the Assyrian army to the city of Opis, where the ships were then pulled ashore and transported overland to a canal that linked to the Euphrates. The two fleets then combined into one and continued down to the Persian Gulf. At the head of the Persian Gulf, a storm flooded the Assyrian camp and the Assyrian soldiers had to take refuge on their ships. They then sailed across the Persian Gulf, a journey which Sennacherib's inscriptions indicate was difficult since repeated sacrifices were made to Ea, the god of the deep.

Successfully landing on the Elamite coast, the Assyrians then hunted and attacked the Chaldean refugees, something that both Babylonian and Assyrian sources hold went well for the Assyrians. Sennacherib's account of the campaign describe the affair as a "great victory" and list several cities taken and sacked by the Assyrian army. Although Sennacherib at last got his revenge on Marduk-apla-iddina, his arch-enemy had not lived to see it, having died of natural causes before the Assyrians landed in Elam. The war then took an unexpected turn as the king of Elam, Hallutash-Inshushinak I, took advantage of the Assyrian army being so far away from home to invade Babylonia. With the aid of surviving Chaldean troops, Hallutash-Inshushinak took the city of Sippar, where he also managed to capture Ashur-nadin-shumi and take him back to Elam. Ashur-nadin-shumi was then never heard from again, probably having been executed. In Ashur-nadin-shumi's place, a native Babylonian, Nergal-ushezib, became Babylon's king. Babylonian records ascribe Nergal-ushezib's rise to power to being appointed by Hallutash-Inshushinak, whereas Assyrian records state that he was chosen by the Babylonians themselves.

The Assyrian army, by now surrounded by the Elamites in southern Babylonia, managed to kill the son of Hallutash-Inshushinak in a skirmish but remained trapped for at least nine months. Wishing to consolidate his position as king, Nergal-ushezib took advantage of the situation and captured and plundered the city of Nippur. Some months later, the Assyrians attacked and captured the southern city of Uruk. Nergal-ushezib was frightened by this development and called on the Elamites for aid. Just seven days after taking Uruk, the Assyrians and Babylonians met in battle at Nippur, where the Assyrians won a decisive victory; routing the Elamite-Babylonian army and capturing Nergal-ushezib, finally free from their entrapped position in the south. Through some unknown means, Sennacherib had managed to slip by the Babylonian and Elamite forces undetected some months prior and was not present at the final battle, instead probably being on his way from Assyria with additional troops. Once he rejoined his southern army, the war with Babylonia was already won.

Soon thereafter, a revolt broke out in Elam which saw the deposition of Hallutash-Inshushinak and the rise of Kutur-Nahhunte to the throne. Determined to end the threat of Elam, Sennacherib retook the city of Der, occupied by Elam during the previous conflict, and advanced into northern Elam. Kutur-Nahhunte could not organize an efficient defense against the Assyrians and refused to fight them, instead fleeing to the mountain city of Haidalu. Shortly thereafter, the severe weather forced Sennacherib to retreat and return home.

=== Destruction of Babylon ===
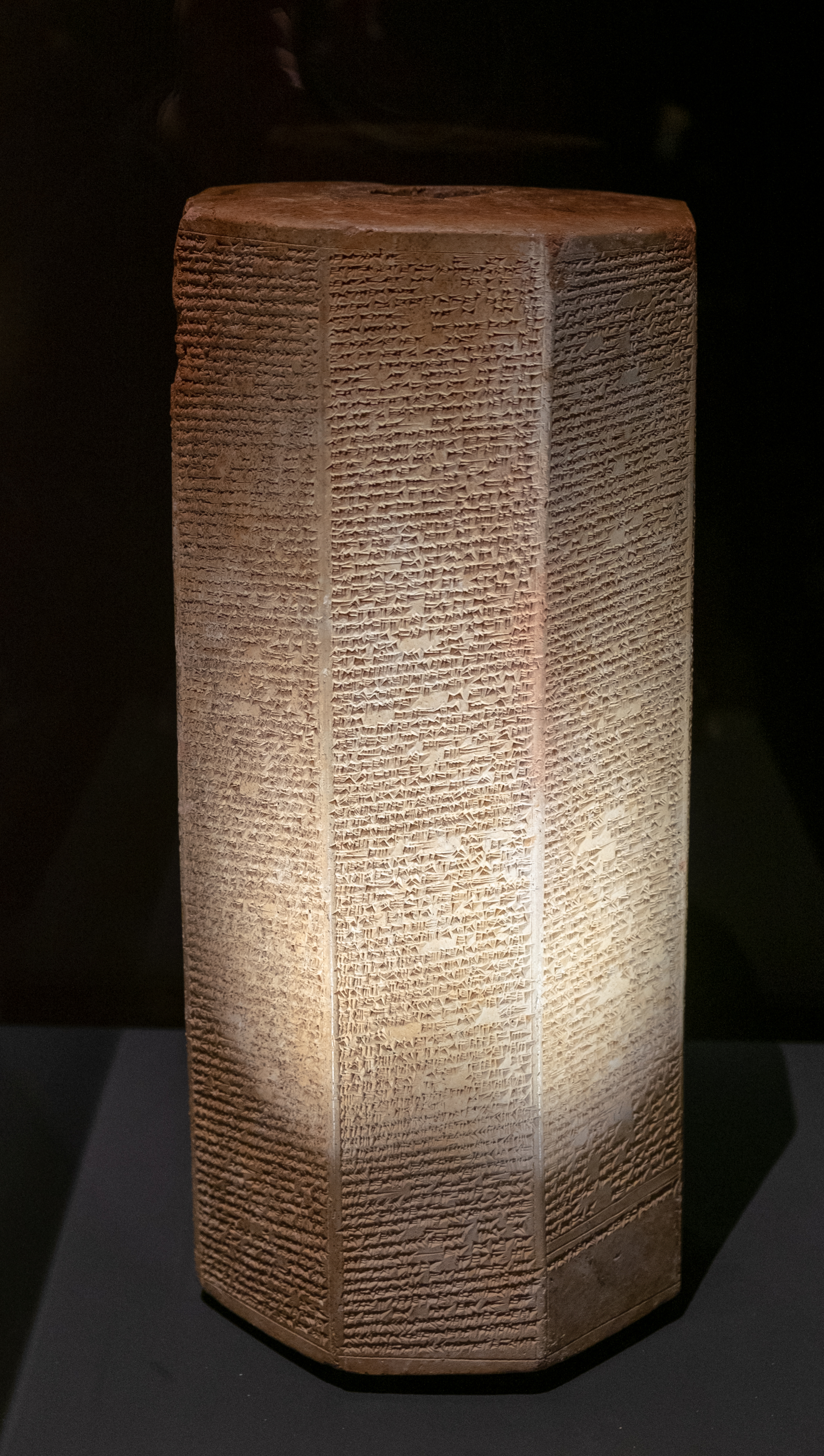
Prism of Sennacherib, containing records of his military campaigns, culminating with Babylon's destruction

Despite the defeat of Nergal-ushezib and the flight of the Elamites, Babylonia did not surrender to Sennacherib. The rebel Shuzubu, hunted by Sennacherib in his 700 BC invasion of the south, had resurfaced under the name Mushezib-Marduk and, seemingly without foreign support, acceded to the throne of Babylon. As he was king by 692 BC, but not described in Assyrian sources as "revolting" until 691 BC, it is possible that his rule was initially accepted by Sennacherib. There was also a change in rulership in Elam, where Kutur-Nahhunte was deposed in favor of Humban-menanu, who began assembling the anti-Assyrian coalition once more. Mushezib-Marduk ensured Humban-menanu's support by bribing him. The Assyrian records considered Humban-menanu's decision to support Babylonia to be unintelligent, describing him as a "man without any sense or judgement".

Sennacherib met his enemies in battle near the city of Halule. Humban-menanu and his commander, Humban-undasha, led the Babylonian and Elamite forces. The outcome of the Battle of Halule is unclear since the records of both sides claim a great victory. Sennacherib claims in his annals that Humban-undasha was killed and that the enemy kings fled for their lives whereas the Babylonian chronicles claim that it was the Assyrians who retreated. If the battle was a southern victory, the setback faced by the Assyrians would have to have been minor as Babylon was under siege in the late summer of 690 BC (and had apparently been under siege for some time at that point). The Assyrians had not marched on Babylon immediately, however, as military actions are recorded elsewhere. In 1973, the Assyriologist John A. Brinkman wrote that it was likely that the southerners won the battle, though probably suffering many casualties, since both of Sennacherib's enemies still remained on their respective thrones after the fighting. In 1982, Assyriologist Louis D. Levine wrote that the battle was probably an Assyrian victory, though not a decisive one and that though the southerners had been defeated and fled, the Assyrian advance on Babylon itself was temporarily halted. The Assyrian army's diversion from its course could then be interpreted by the Babylonian chroniclers as an Assyrian retreat.

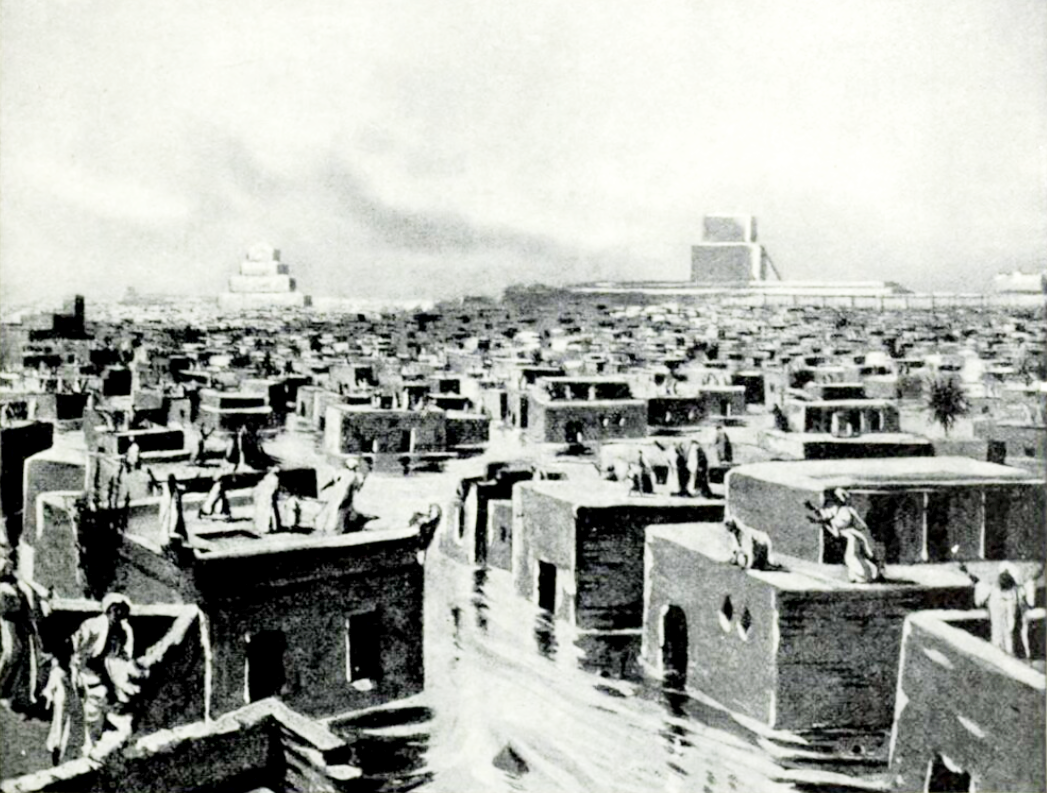
20th-century illustration of Sennacherib's destruction of Babylon

In 690 BC, Humban-menanu suffered a stroke and his jaw became locked in a way that prevented him from speaking. Taking advantage of the situation, Sennacherib embarked on his final campaign against Babylon. Although the Babylonians were successful initially, that was short-lived, and in the same year, the siege of Babylon was already well underway. It is likely Babylon would have been in a poor position once it fell to Sennacherib in 689 BC, having been besieged for over fifteen months. Although Sennacherib had once anxiously considered the implications of Sargon's seizure of Babylon and the role that the city's offended gods may have played in his father's downfall, his attitude towards the city had shifted by 689 BC. Ultimately, Sennacherib decided to destroy Babylon. Brinkman believed that Sennacherib's change in attitude came from a will to avenge his son and tiring of a city well within the borders of his empire repeatedly rebelling against his rule. According to Brinkman, Sennacherib might have lost the affection he once had for Babylon's gods because they had inspired their people to attack him. Sennacherib's own account of the destruction reads:

Into my land I carried off alive Mušēzib-Marduk, king of Babylonia, together with his family and officials. I counted out the wealth of that city—silver, gold, precious stones, property and goods—into the hands of my people; and they took it as their own. The hands of my people laid hold of the gods dwelling there and smashed them; they took their property and goods.
I destroyed the city and its houses, from foundation to parapet; I devastated and burned them. I razed the brick and earthenwork of the outer and inner wall of the city, of the temples, and of the ziggurat; and I dumped these into the Araḫtu canal. I dug canals through the midst of that city, I overwhelmed it with water, I made its very foundations disappear, and I destroyed it more completely than a devastating flood. So that it might be impossible in future days to recognize the site of that city and its temples, I utterly dissolved it with water and made it like inundated land.

Although Sennacherib destroyed the city, he appears to have still been somewhat fearful of Babylon's ancient gods. Earlier in his account of the campaign, he specifically mentions the sanctuaries of the Babylonian deities had provided financial support to his enemies. The passage describing the seizure of the property of the gods and the destruction of some of their statues is one of the few where Sennacherib uses "my people" rather than "I". Brinkman interpreted this in 1973 as leaving the blame of the fate of the temples not personally on Sennacherib himself, but on the decisions made by the temple personnel and the actions of the Assyrian people.

During the destruction of the city, Sennacherib destroyed the temples and the images of the gods, except for that of Marduk, which he took to Assyria. This caused consternation in Assyria itself, where Babylon and its gods were held in high esteem. Sennacherib attempted justifying his actions to his own countrymen through a campaign of religious propaganda. Among the elements of this campaign, he commissioned a myth in which Marduk was put on trial before Ashur, the god of Assyria. This text is fragmentary, but it seems Marduk is found guilty of some grave offense. Sennacherib described his defeat of the Babylonian rebels in the language of the Babylonian creation myth, identifying Babylon with the evil demon-goddess Tiamat and himself with Marduk. Ashur replaced Marduk in the New Year's festival, and in the temple of the festival he placed a symbolic pile of rubble from Babylon. In Babylonia, Sennacherib's policy spawned a deep-seated hatred amongst much of the populace.

Sennacherib's goal was the complete eradication of Babylonia as a political entity. Though some northern Babylonian territories became Assyrian provinces, the Assyrians made no effort to rebuild Babylon itself, and southern chronicles from the time refer to the era as the "kingless" period when there was no king in the land.

=== Renovation of Nineveh ===
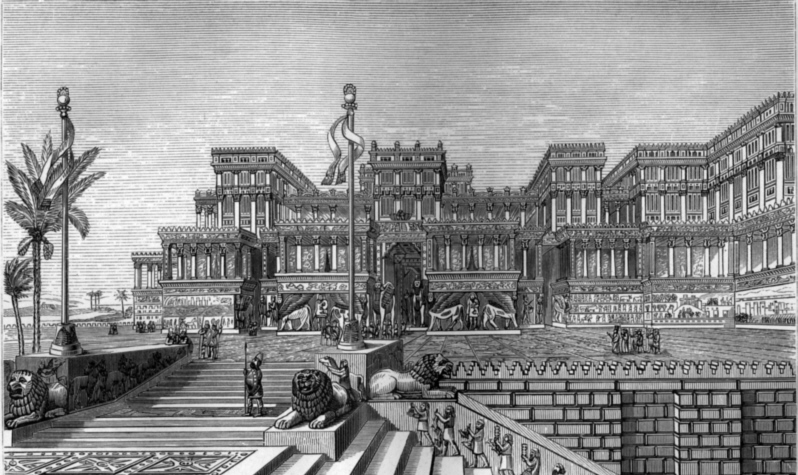
1876 reconstruction of Sennacherib's "Palace without Rival" in Nineveh by John Philip Newman

After the final war with Babylon, Sennacherib dedicated his time to improving his new capital at Nineveh rather than embarking on large military campaigns. Nineveh had been an important city in northern Mesopotamia for millennia. The oldest traces of human settlement at its location are from the 7th millennium BC, and from the 4th millennium BC and onward it formed an important administrative center in the north. When Sennacherib made the city his new capital it experienced one of the most ambitious building projects in ancient history, being completely transformed from the somewhat neglected state it had been in before his reign. Whereas his father's new capital, Dur-Sharrukin, was more or less an imitation of the previous capital of Nimrud, Sennacherib intended to make Nineveh into a city whose magnificence and size astonished the civilized world.

The earliest inscriptions discussing the building project at Nineveh date to 702 BC and concern the construction of the Southwest Palace, a large residence constructed in the southwestern part of the citadel. Sennacherib called this palace the ekallu ša šānina la išu, the "Palace without Rival". During the construction process, a smaller palace was torn down, a stream of water which had been eroding parts of the palace mound was redirected and a terrace which the new palace was to stand on was erected and raised to the height of 160 layers of brick. Though many of these early inscriptions talk about the palace as if it were already completed, this was the standard way of writing about building projects in ancient Assyria. The Nineveh described in Sennacherib's earliest accounts of its renovation was a city which at that point only existed in his imagination.

By 700 BC the walls of the Southwest Palace's throne room were being constructed, followed shortly by the many reliefs to be displayed within it. The final step in the palace's construction was the erection of colossal statues depicting bulls and lions, characteristic of Late Assyrian architecture. Though such stone statues have been excavated at Nineveh, similar colossal statues mentioned in the inscriptions as being made of precious metals remain missing. The roof of the palace was constructed with cypress and cedar recovered from the mountains in the west, and the palace was illuminated through multiple windows and decorated with silver and bronze pegs on the inside and glazed bricks on the outside. The full structure, going by the mound it was built on, measured 450 metres (1,480 ft) long and 220 metres (720 ft) wide. An inscription on a stone lion in the quarter associated with Sennacherib's queen, Tashmetu-sharrat, contains hopes that the king and queen would both live healthily and long within the new palace. The text of the inscription, written in an unusually intimate way, reads:

And for the queen Tashmetu-sharrat, my beloved wife, whose features Belet-ili has made more beautiful than all other women, I had a palace of love, joy and pleasure built. [...] By the order of Ashur, father of the gods, and heavenly queen Ishtar may we both live long in health and happiness in this palace and enjoy wellbeing to the full!

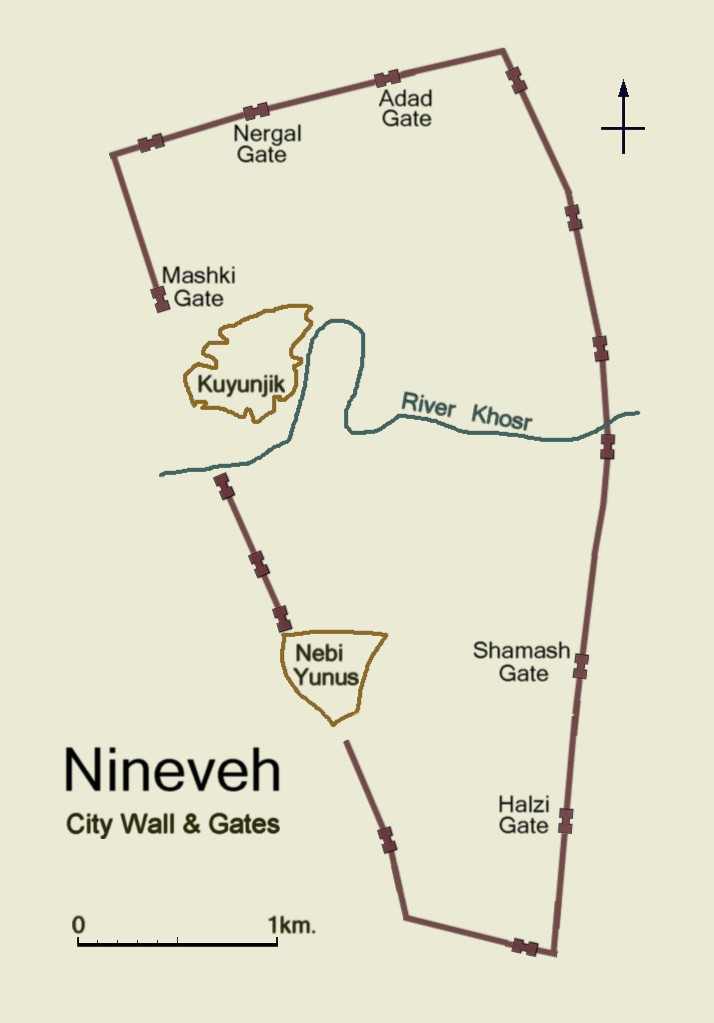
City plan of Nineveh (left) and a close-up of the Kuyunjik mound (right), where Sennacherib's palace was constructed. The northern palace depicted on the map was first built during the reign of Sennacherib's grandson Ashurbanipal.

Though probably conceived as a structure like the palace Sargon built at Dur-Sharrukin, Sennacherib's palace, and especially the artwork featured within it, shows some differences. Though Sargon's reliefs usually show the king as close to other members of the Assyrian aristocracy, Sennacherib's art usually depicts the king towering above everyone else in his vicinity due to being mounted in a chariot. His reliefs show larger scenes, some almost from a bird's-eye point of view. There are also examples of a more naturalistic approach in the art; where colossal statues of bulls from Sargon's palace depict them with five legs so that four legs could be seen from either side and two from the front, Sennacherib's bulls all have four legs. Sennacherib constructed beautiful gardens at his new palace, importing various plants and herbs from throughout his empire and beyond. Cotton plants may have been imported from as far away as India. Some suggest the famous Hanging Gardens of Babylon, one of the Seven Wonders of the Ancient World, were actually these gardens in Nineveh. Eckhart Frahm considers this idea unlikely on account of the impressive royal gardens in Babylon itself.

Besides the palace, Sennacherib oversaw other building projects at Nineveh. He built a large second palace at the city's southern mound, which served as an arsenal to store military equipment and as permanent quarters for part of the Assyrian standing army. Numerous temples were built and restored, many of them on the Kuyunjik mound (where the Southwest Palace was located), including a temple dedicated to the god Sîn (invoked in the king's own name). Sennacherib also massively expanded the city to the south and erected enormous new city walls, surrounded by a moat, up to 25 metres (82 ft) high and 15 metres (49 ft) thick.

=== Conspiracy, murder and succession ===
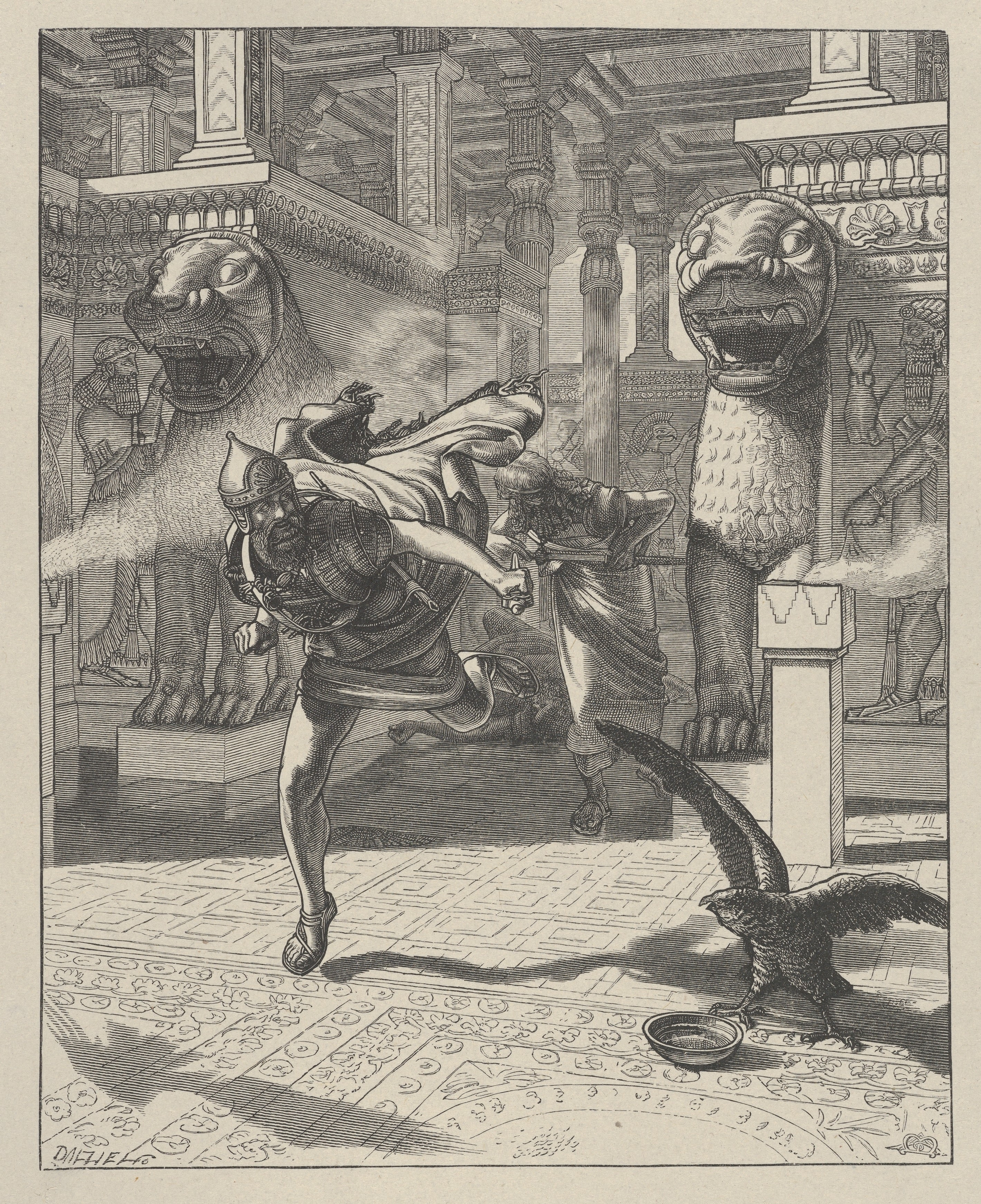
The Flight of Adrammelech, illustration from Dalziel's Bible Gallery (1881), depicting Arda-Mulissu and Nabu-shar-usur escaping after murdering their father Sennacherib

When his eldest son and original crown prince, Ashur-nadin-shumi, disappeared, presumably executed, Sennacherib selected his eldest surviving son, Arda-Mulissu, as the new crown prince. Arda-Mulissu held the position of the heir apparent for several years until 684 BC when Sennacherib suddenly replaced him with his younger brother Esarhaddon. The reason for Arda-Mulissu's sudden dismissal is unknown, but it is clear from contemporary inscriptions that he was very disappointed. Esarhaddon's influential mother, Naqi'a, may have played a role in convincing Sennacherib to choose Esarhaddon as heir. Despite his dismissal, Arda-Mulissu remained a popular figure, and some vassals secretly supported him as the heir to the throne.

Sennacherib forced Arda-Mulissu to swear loyalty to Esarhaddon, but Arda-Mulissu made many appeals to his father to reinstate him as heir. Sennacherib noted the increasing popularity of Arda-Mulissu and came to fear for his designated successor, so he sent Esarhaddon to the western provinces. Esarhaddon's exile put Arda-Mulissu in a difficult position as he had reached the height of his popularity but was powerless to do anything to his brother. To take advantage of the opportunity, Arda-Mulissu decided he needed to act quickly and take the throne by force. He concluded a "treaty of rebellion" with another of his younger brothers, Nabu-shar-usur, and on 20 October 681 BC, they attacked and killed their father in one of Nineveh's temples, possibly the one dedicated to Sîn.

The murder of Sennacherib, ruler of one of the world's strongest empires at the time, shocked his contemporaries. People throughout the Near East received the news with strong emotions and mixed feelings. The denizens of the Levant and Babylonia celebrated the news and proclaimed the act as divine punishment because of Sennacherib's brutal campaigns against them; 'in Assyria, the reaction must have been overwhelmingly horror and resentment.'

Despite the success of their conspiracy, Arda-Mulissu could not seize the throne. The murder of the king caused some resentment against him by his own supporters which delayed his potential coronation, and in the meantime, Esarhaddon had raised an army. The army raised by Arda-Mulissu and Nabu-shar-usur met Esarhaddon's forces in Hanigalbat, a region in the western parts of the empire. There, most of their soldiers deserted and joined Esarhaddon, who then marched on Nineveh without opposition, becoming the new king of Assyria. Shortly after taking the throne, Esarhaddon executed all of the conspirators and political enemies within his reach, including his brothers' families. Every servant involved with the security of the royal palace at Nineveh was executed. Arda-Mulissu and Nabu-shar-usur survived this purge, escaping as exiles to the northern kingdom of Urartu.

== Family and children ==
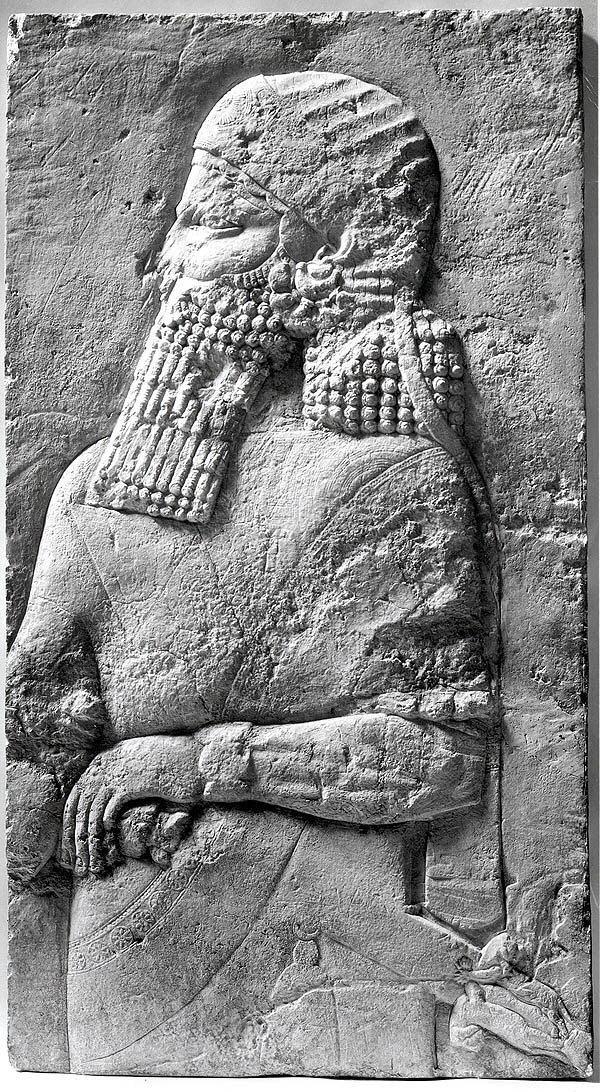
Stele with a depiction of an Assyrian crown prince. Dated to Sennacherib's reign, it could depict Ashur-nadin-shumi, Arda-Mulissu or Esarhaddon.

As was traditional for Assyrian kings, Sennacherib had a harem of many women. Two of his wives are known by name—Tashmetu-sharrat (Tašmetu-šarrat) and Naqi'a (Naqiʾā). Whether both held the position of queen is uncertain, but contemporary sources suggest that though the king's family included multiple women, only one at a time would be recognized as queen and primary consort. For most of Sennacherib's reign, the queen was Tashmetu-sharrat, whose name literally means "Tashmetum is queen". Inscriptions suggest that Sennacherib and Tashmetu-sharrat had a loving relationship, with the king referring to her as "my beloved wife" and publicly praising her beauty.

Whether Naqi'a ever held the title of queen is unclear. She was referred to as the "queen mother" during Esarhaddon's reign, but as she was Esarhaddon's mother, the title may have been bestowed upon her either late in Sennacherib's reign or by Esarhaddon. Though Tashmetu-sharrat was the primary consort for longer, Naqi'a is more well-known today for her role during Esarhaddon's reign. When she became one of Sennacherib's wives, she took the Akkadian name Zakûtu (Naqi'a being an Aramaic name). Having two names could point to Naqi'a being born outside Assyria proper—possibly in Babylonia or in the Levant—but there is no substantial evidence for any theory regarding her origin.

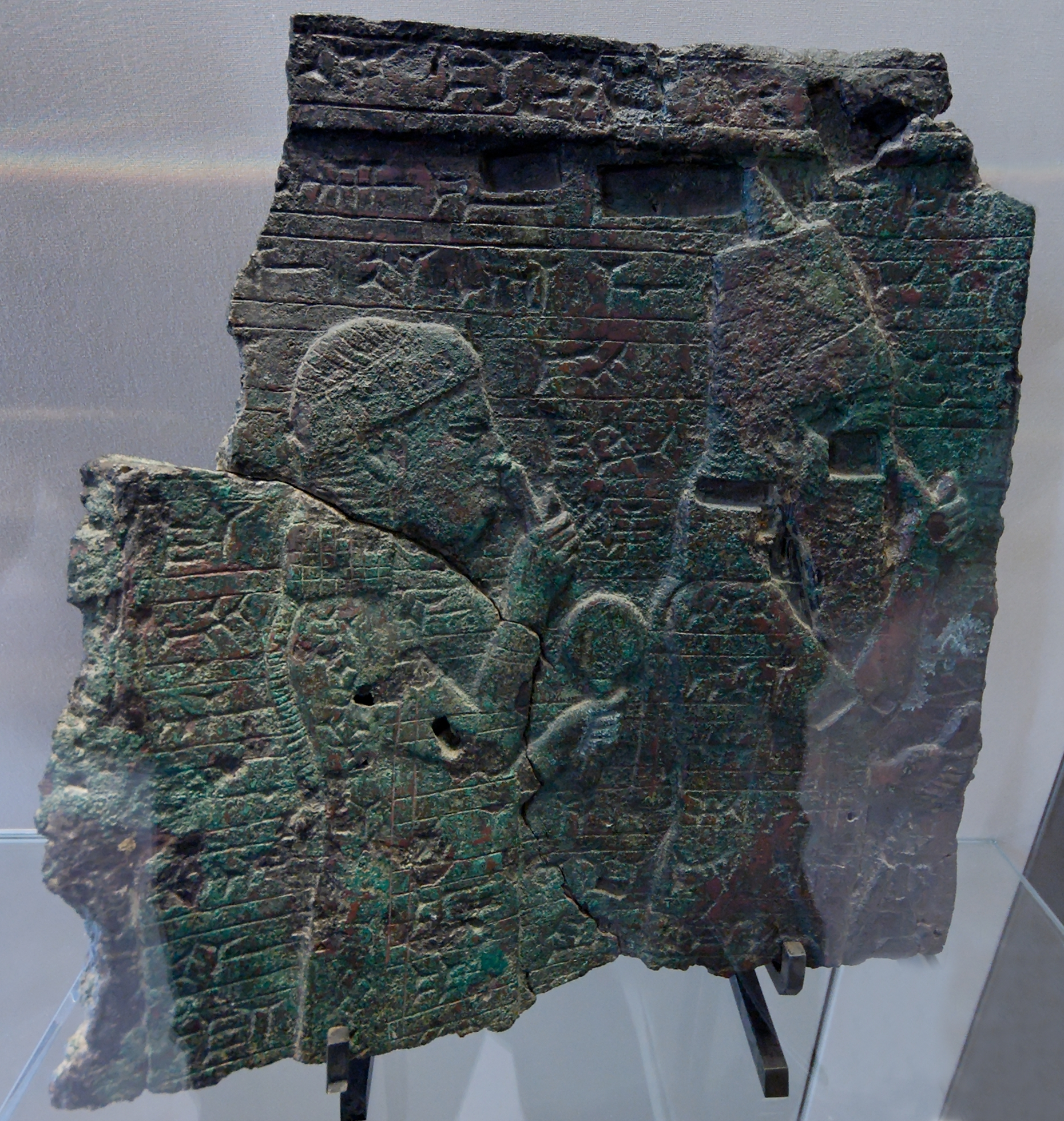
Relief depicting Sennacherib's son and successor Esarhaddon (right) and Esarhaddon's mother (and Sennacherib's wife) Naqi'a (left)

Sennacherib had at least seven sons and one daughter. Except for Esarhaddon, who is known to be Naqi'a's son, which of Sennacherib's wives were his children's mothers is unknown. Tashmetu-sharrat is likely to have been the mother of at least some of them. Their names were:

- Ashur-nadin-shumi (Aššur-nādin-šumi) – probably Sennacherib's eldest son. Appointed king of Babylon and crown prince in 700 BC, he served as both until his capture and execution by the Elamites in 694 BC.
- Ashur-ili-muballissu (Aššur-ili-muballissu) – probably Sennacherib's second eldest son (he is called māru terdennu, meaning "second son"). He is mentioned as being "begotten at the feet of Ashur", suggesting that he held some role in the priesthood. His father gave him a house at Assur, probably at some point before 700 BC, and a precious vase later excavated at Nineveh.
- Arda-Mulissu (Arda-Mulišši) – Sennacherib's eldest living son by the time of Ashur-nadin-shumi's death in 694 BC, he served as his crown prince from 694 BC until 684 BC, when for unknown reasons he was replaced as heir by Esarhaddon. He orchestrated the 681 BC conspiracy which ended in Sennacherib's death in hopes of taking the throne for himself. After his troops were defeated by Esarhaddon, he escaped to Urartu.
- Ashur-shumu-ushabshi (Aššur-šumu-ušabši) – a son whose place in Sennacherib's sequence of children is unknown. Sennacherib gave him a house in Nineveh. Bricks bearing inscriptions discussing the construction of this house were later excavated at Nineveh, possibly indicating that Ashur-shumu-ushabshi had died before the house was completed.
- Esarhaddon (Aššur-aḫa-iddina) – a younger son who served as Sennacherib's crown prince 684–681 BC and succeeded him as the king of Assyria, reigning from 681 to 669 BC.
- Nergal-shumu-ibni (Nergal-šumu-ibni) – the reconstructed name (the full name of the prince is missing in the inscriptions) of another son of Sennacherib. He is mentioned as having employed a large staff, including a personal horse raiser called Sama. He might be the same person as an information officer mentioned in 683 BC. His name might alternatively be reconstructed as Nergal-shumu-usur. Nergal-shumu-ibni might have served as crown prince alongside Arda-Mulissu, possibly as the intended heir to Babylonia, but the evidence is inconclusive.
- Nabu-shar-usur (Nabû-šarru-uṣur) – a younger son who joined Arda-Mulissu in his plot to murder Sennacherib and seize power. He escaped with Arda-Mulissu to Urartu.
- Shadditu (Šadditu) – The only one of Sennacherib's daughters known by name, Shadditu appears in land sale documents and protective rituals were conducted on her behalf. She was probably a daughter of Naqi'a as she retained a place in the royal family during Esarhaddon's reign. She or another daughter was married to an Egyptian noble named Shushanqu sometime before 692 BC.

A small tablet excavated at Nineveh lists the names of mythological Mesopotamian heroes, such as Gilgamesh, and some personal names. As the name Ashur-ili-muballissu appears in the list of personal names, alongside fragmentary names that could possibly be reconstructed as Ashur-nadin-shumi (or Ashur-shumu-ushabshi) and Esarhaddon, it is also possible that the other personal names were names of further sons of Sennacherib. These names include Ile''e-bullutu-Aššur, Aššur-mukkaniš-ilija, Ana-Aššur-taklak, Aššur-bani-beli, Samaš-andullašu (or Samaš-salamšu) and Aššur-šakin-liti.

== Character ==
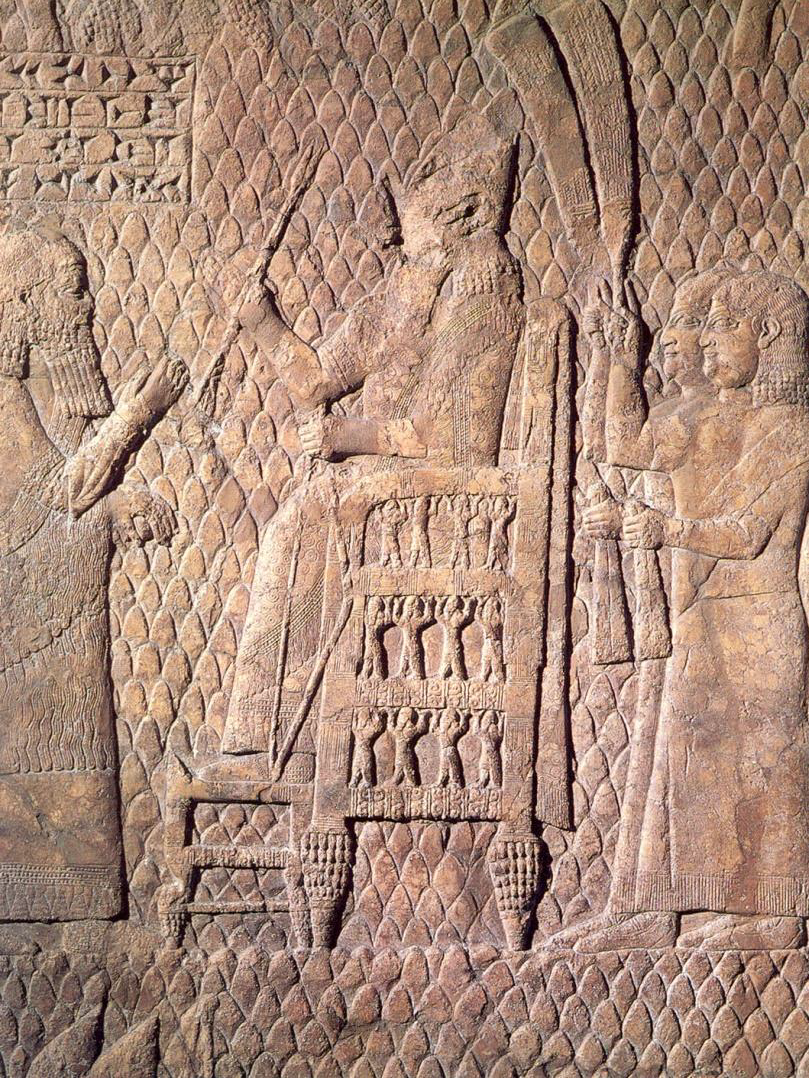
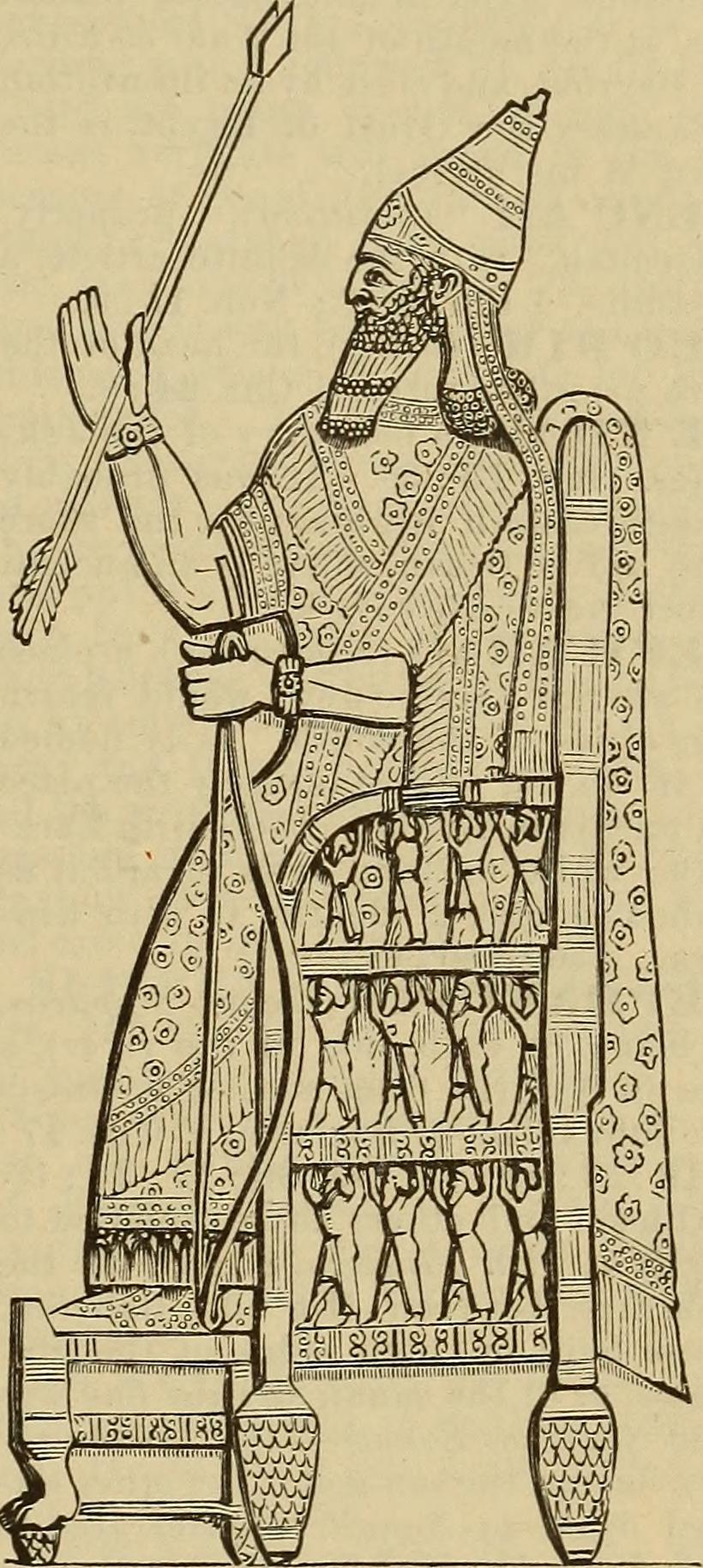
Sennacherib shown enthroned in the Lachish reliefs, which depict his war in the Levant. Detailed drawing from the 1887 book A Dictionary of the Bible by Philip Schaff on the right.

The main sources that can be used to deduce Sennacherib's personality are his royal inscriptions. These inscriptions were not written by the king, but by his royal scribes. They often served as propaganda meant to portray the king as better than all other rulers, both contemporary and ancient. Furthermore, Assyrian royal inscriptions often describe only military and construction matters and were highly formulaic, differing little from king to king. By examining the inscriptions and comparing them to those of other kings and non-royal inscriptions, it is possible to infer some aspects of Sennacherib's character. Like the inscriptions of other Assyrian kings, his show pride and high self-esteem, for instance in the passage: "Ashur, father of the gods, looked steadfastly upon me among all the rulers and he made my weapons greater than (those of) all who sit on (royal) daises." In several places, Sennacherib's great intelligence is emphasized, for instance in the passage, "the god Ninshiku gave me wide understanding equal to (that of) the sage Adapu (and) endowed me with broad knowledge". Several inscriptions call him "foremost of all rulers" (ašared kal malkī) and a "perfect man" (eṭlu gitmālu). Sennacherib's decision to keep his birth name when he became king rather than assuming a throne name, something at least 19 of his 21 immediate predecessors had done, suggests self-confidence. Sennacherib assumed several new epithets never used by Assyrian kings, such as "guardian of the right" and "lover of justice", suggesting a desire to leave a personal mark on a new era beginning with his reign.

When Sennacherib became king, he was already an adult and had served as Sargon's crown prince for over 15 years and understood the empire's administration. Unlike many preceding and later Assyrian kings (including his father), Sennacherib did not portray himself as a conqueror or express much desire to conquer the world. Instead, his inscriptions often portrayed the most important parts of his reign as his large-scale building projects. Most of Sennacherib's campaigns were not aimed at conquest, but at suppressing revolts against his rule, restoring lost territories and securing treasure to finance his building projects. That his generals led several of the campaigns, rather than Sennacherib himself, shows he was not as interested in campaigning as his predecessors had been. The brutal retribution and punishment served to Assyria's enemies described in Sennacherib's accounts do not necessarily reflect the truth. They also served as intimidating tools for propaganda and psychological warfare.

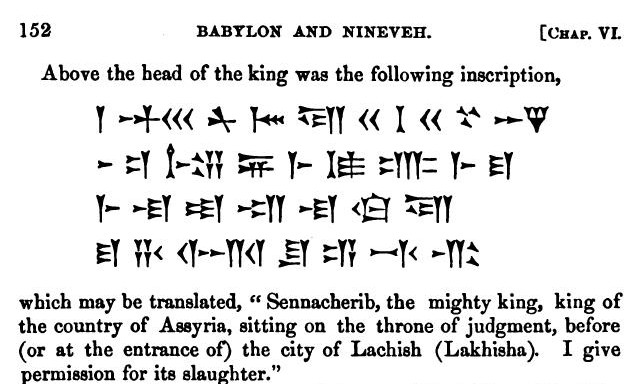
Writing in Akkadian and its translation into English from above the head of Sennacherib in the reliefs depicting the siege of Lachish. From Austen Henry Layard's 1853 book Discoveries in the Ruins of Nineveh and Babylon.

Despite the apparent lack of interest in world domination, Sennacherib assumed the traditional Mesopotamian titles that designated rule of the entire world; "king of the universe" and "king of the four corners of the world". Other titles, such as "strong king" and "mighty king", emphasized his power and greatness, along with epithets such as "virile warrior" (zikaru qardu) and "fierce wild bull" (rīmu ekdu). Sennacherib described all of his campaigns, even the unsuccessful ones, as victories in his own accounts. This was not necessarily because of personal pride; his subjects would have viewed a failed campaign as a sign that the gods no longer favored his rule. Sennacherib was fully convinced that the gods supported him and saw all his wars as just for this reason.

Frahm believes that it is possible that Sennacherib suffered from posttraumatic stress disorder because of the catastrophic fate of his father. From the sources, it appears that bad news easily enraged Sennacherib and that he developed serious psychological problems. His son and successor Esarhaddon mentions in his inscriptions that the "alû demon" afflicted Sennacherib and that none of his diviners initially dared to tell the king they had observed signs pointing to the demon. What the alû demon was is not entirely understood, but the typical symptoms described in contemporary documents include the afflicted not knowing who they are, their pupils constricting, their limbs being tense, being incapable of speech and their ears roaring.

Frahm and the Assyriologist Julian E. Reade have pondered the idea that Sennacherib could be classified as a feminist. Female members of the court were more prominent and enjoyed greater privileges under Sennacherib's reign than under the reigns of previous Assyrian kings. The reasons for his policy towards his female relatives are unknown. He might have wanted to shift power away from powerful generals and magnates to his own family, having encountered powerful Arab queens who made their own decisions and led armies. He may have been compensating for the way he treated his father's memory. Evidence of the increased standing of the royal women includes the larger number of texts referencing Assyrian queens from Sennacherib's reign compared to queens of earlier times, and evidence that Sennacherib's queens had their own standing military units, just like the king. Mirroring the increased standing of the women of the royal family, during Sennacherib's time female deities were depicted more frequently. For example, the god Ashur is portrayed frequently with a female companion, probably the goddess Mullissu.

Despite Sennacherib's superstition in regards to the fate of his father and his conviction of divine support, Reade believes that the king to some degree was skeptical of religion. Sennacherib's ultimate treatment of Babylon, destroying the city and its temples, was sacrilege and the king appears to have neglected the temples in Assyria until he carried out a renovation of the temple of Ashur in Assur late in his reign.

== Legacy ==
=== In popular memory ===
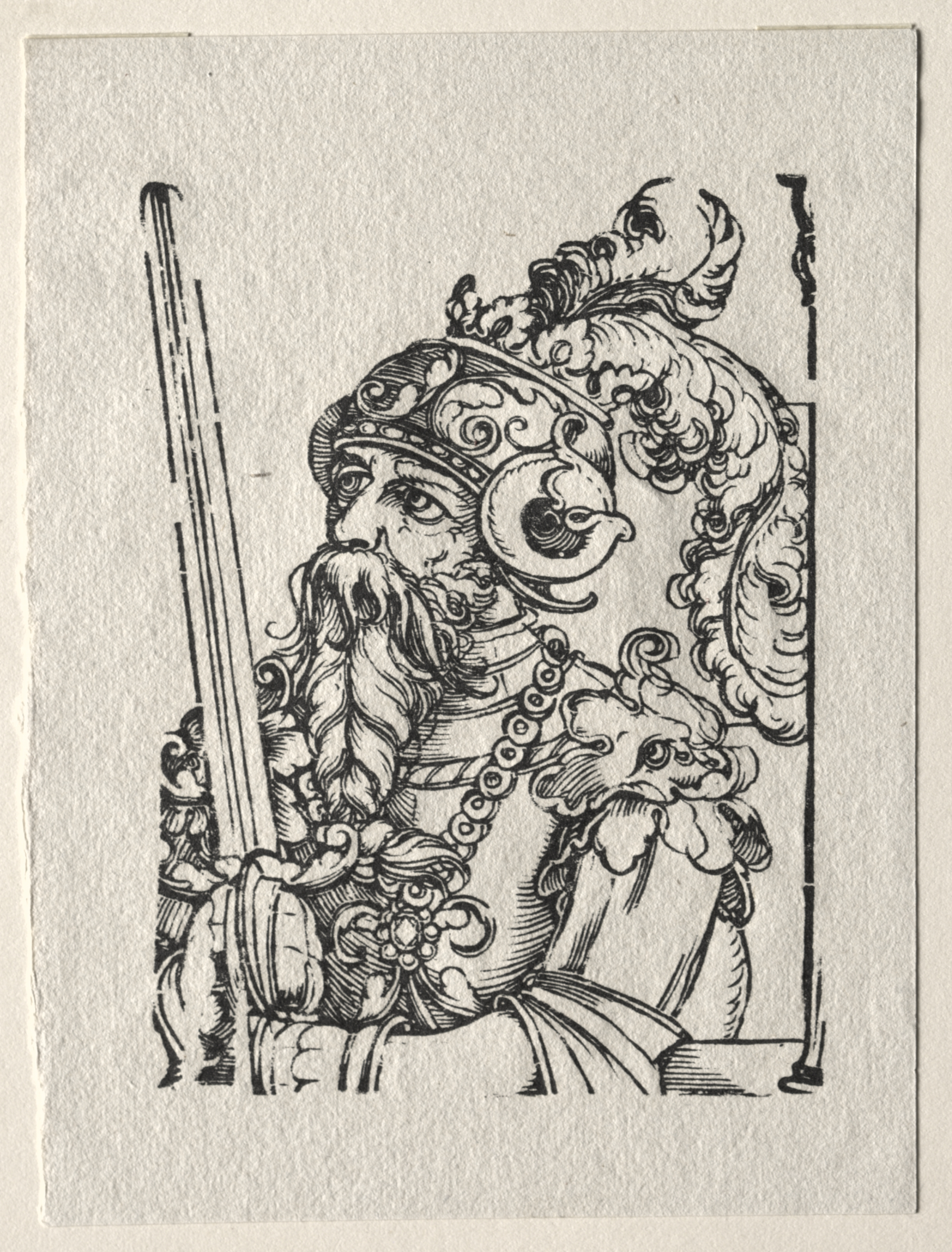
Woodcut depicting Sennacherib by 16th-century German engraver, painter and printmaker Georg Pencz, from a series of woodcuts titled Tyrants of the Old Testament

Throughout the millennia following Sennacherib's death, the popular image of the king has been mainly negative. The first reason for this is Sennacherib's negative portrayal in the Bible as the evil conqueror who attempted to take Jerusalem; the second is his destruction of Babylon, one of the most prominent cities in the ancient world. This negative view of Sennacherib endured until modern times. Sennacherib is presented as akin to a ruthless predator, attacking Judah as a "wolf on the fold" in the 1815 poem The Destruction of Sennacherib by Lord Byron:

The Assyrian came down like the wolf on the fold,
And his cohorts were gleaming in purple and gold;
And the sheen of their spears was like stars on the sea,
When the blue wave rolls nightly on deep Galilee.

— Lord Byron (1815), The Destruction of Sennacherib, first stanza.

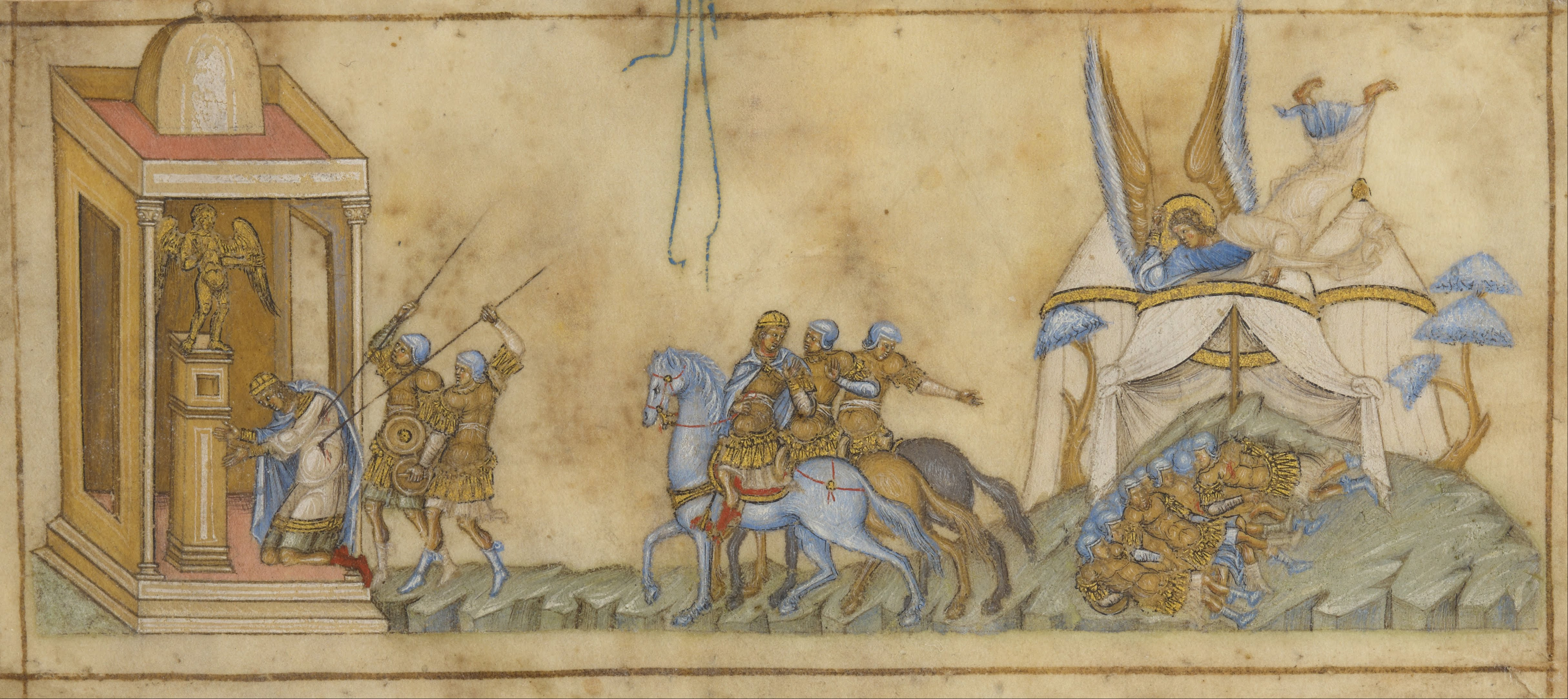
Miniature from a book of Old Testament prophets made in Sicily around 1300, portraying three separate scenes from Sennacherib's war against the Israelites. On the right, an angel is portrayed as destroying his army. In the center, Sennacherib and his remaining soldiers are shown on their way back to Nineveh. On the left, two of Sennacherib's sons murder him as he is praying before a pagan idol.

Biblical archaeologist Isaac Kalimi and historian Seth Richardson described Sennacherib's 701 BC attack against Jerusalem as a "world event" in 2014, noting that it drew together the fates of numerous otherwise disparate groups. According to Kalimi, the event and its aftermath affected and had consequences for not only the Assyrians and the Israelites, but also the Babylonians, Egyptians, Nubians, Neo-Hittites and Anatolian peoples. The siege is discussed not only in contemporary sources, but in later folklore and traditions, such as Aramaic folklore, in later Greco-Roman histories of the Near East and in the tales of medieval Syriac Christians and Arabs. Sennacherib's Levantine campaign is a significant event in the Bible, being brought up and discussed in many places, notably 2 Kings 18:13–19:37, 20:6 and 2 Chronicles 32:1–23. A vast majority of the Biblical accounts of King Hezekiah's reign in 2 Kings is dedicated to Sennacherib's campaign, cementing it as the most important event of Hezekiah's time. In Chronicles, Sennacherib's failure and Hezekiah's success is emphasized. The Assyrian campaign (described as an act of aggression rather than as a response to Hezekiah's rebellious activities) is seen as doomed to fail from the start. According to the narrative, no enemy, not even the powerful king of Assyria, would have been able to triumph over Hezekiah as the Judean king had God on his side. The conflict is presented as something akin to a holy war: God's war against the pagan Sennacherib.

Though Assyria had more than a hundred kings throughout its long history, Sennacherib (along with his son Esarhaddon and grandsons Ashurbanipal and Shamash-shum-ukin) is one of the few kings who was remembered and figured in Aramaic and Syriac folklore long after the kingdom had fallen. The ancient Aramaic story of Ahikar portrays Sennacherib as a benevolent patron of the titular character Ahikar, with Esarhaddon portrayed more negatively. Medieval Syriac tales characterize Sennacherib as an archetypical pagan king assassinated as part of a family feud, whose children convert to Christianity. The legend of the 4th-century Saints Behnam and Sarah casts Sennacherib, under the name Sinharib, as their royal father. After Behnam converts to Christianity, Sinharib orders his execution, but is later struck by a dangerous disease that is cured through being baptized by Saint Matthew in Assur. Thankful, Sinharib then converts to Christianity and founds an important monastery near Mosul, called Deir Mar Mattai.

Sennacherib also occupied various roles in later Jewish tradition. In Midrash, examinations of the Old Testament and later stories, the events of 701 BC are often explored in detail; many times featuring massive armies deployed by Sennacherib and pointing out how he repeatedly consulted astrologers on his campaign, delaying his actions. In the stories, Sennacherib's armies are destroyed when Hezekiah recites Hallel psalms on the eve of Passover. The event is often portrayed as an apocalyptic scenario, with Hezekiah portrayed as a messianic figure and Sennacherib and his armies being personifications of Gog and Magog. Sennacherib, due to the role he plays in the Bible, remains one of the most famous Assyrian kings to this day.

Sennacherib appears in Dante's Divine Comedy, in the Purgatorio, as an exemplar of pride: "Now was shown how his sons fell upon Sennacherib inside the temple, and how, slain, they left him there".

=== Archaeological discoveries ===
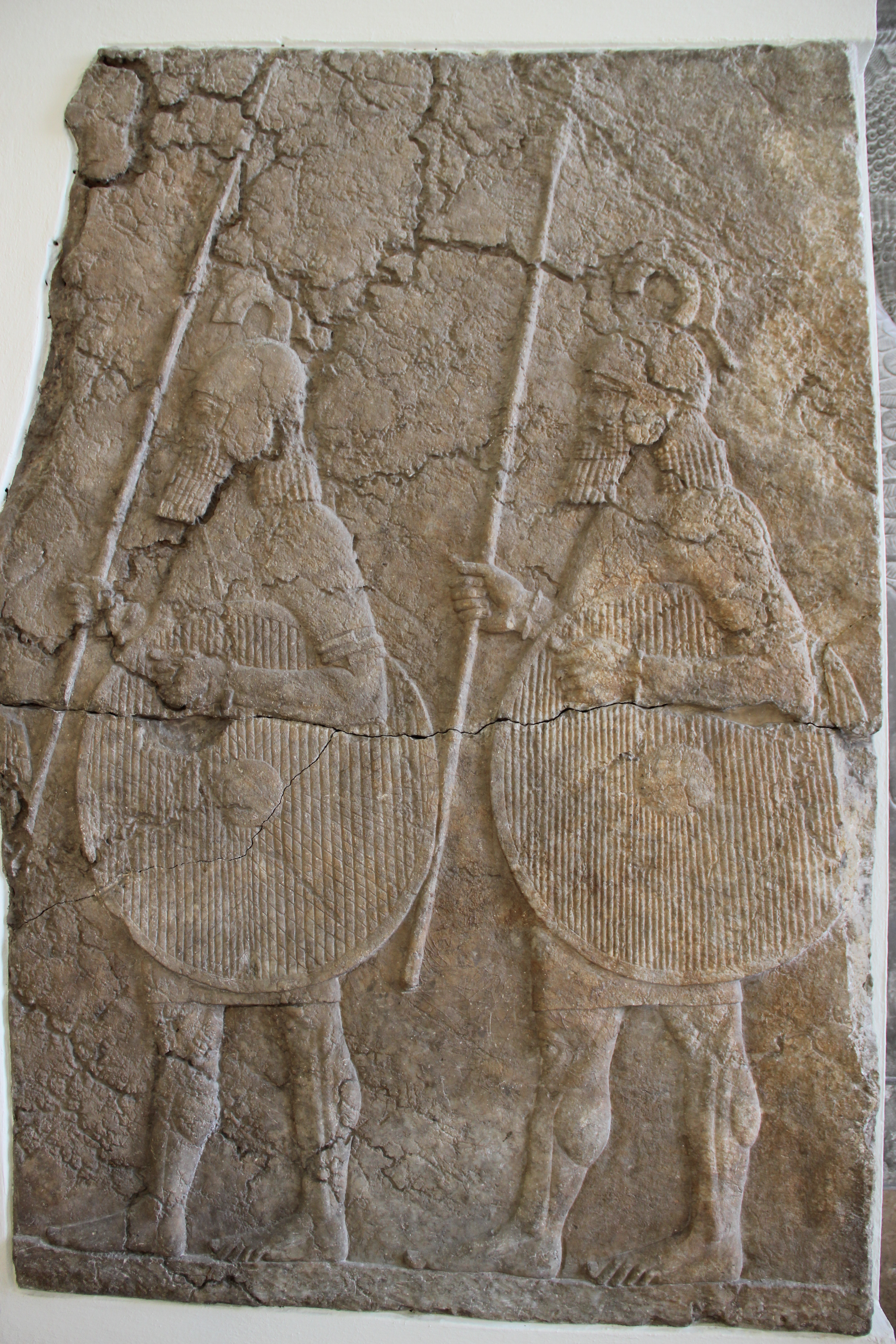
Relief depicting two Assyrian soldiers, from Sennacherib's palace

The discovery of Sennacherib's own inscriptions in the 19th century, in which brutal and cruel acts such as ordering the throats of his Elamite enemies to be slit, and their hands and lips cut off, amplified his already ferocious reputation. Today, many such inscriptions are known, most of them housed in the collections of the Vorderasiatisches Museum in Berlin and the British Museum in London, though many are located throughout the world in other institutions and private collections. Some large objects with Sennacherib's inscriptions remain at Nineveh, where some have even been reburied. Sennacherib's own accounts of his building projects and military campaigns, typically referred to as his "annals", were often copied several times and spread throughout the Neo-Assyrian Empire during his reign. For the first six years of his reign, they were written on clay cylinders, but he later began using clay prisms, probably because they provided a greater surface area.

Letters associated with Sennacherib are fewer in number than those known from his father and the time of his son Esarhaddon; most of them are from Sennacherib's tenure as crown prince. Other types of non-royal inscriptions from Sennacherib's reign, such as administrative documents, economic documents and chronicles, are more numerous. In addition to written sources, many pieces of artwork have also survived from Sennacherib's time, notably the king's reliefs from his palace at Nineveh. They typically depict his conquests, sometimes with short pieces of text explaining the scene shown. First discovered and excavated from 1847 to 1851 by the British archaeologist Austen Henry Layard, the discovery of reliefs depicting Sennacherib's siege of Lachish in the Southwest Palace was the first archaeological confirmation of an event described in the Bible.

The Assyriologists Hormuzd Rassam and Henry Creswicke Rawlinson from 1852 to 1854, William Kennett Loftus from 1854 to 1855 and George Smith from 1873 to 1874 led further excavations of the Southwest Palace. Among the many inscriptions found at the site, Smith discovered a fragmentary account of a flood, which generated much excitement both among scholars and the public. Since Smith, the site has experienced several periods of intense excavation and study; Rassam returned from 1878 to 1882, the Egyptologist E. A. Wallis Budge oversaw excavations from 1889 to 1891, the Assyriologist Leonard William King from 1903 to 1904 and the Assyriologist Reginald Campbell Thompson in 1905 and from 1931 to 1932. The Iraqi Department of Antiquities under the Assyriologist Tariq Madhloom conducted the most recent expeditions from 1965 to 1968. Many of Sennacherib's reliefs are exhibited today at the Vorderasiatisches Museum, the British Museum, the Iraq Museum in Baghdad, the Metropolitan Museum of Art in New York and the Louvre in Paris.

The traditional negative assessment of Sennacherib as a ruthless conqueror has faded away in modern scholarship. Writing in 1978, Reade assessed Sennacherib as a king who stands out among Assyrian rulers as open-minded and far-sighted and that he was a man "who not only coped effectively with ordinary crises but even turned them to advantage as he created, or attempted to create, a stable imperial structure immune from traditional problems". Reade believes that the collapse of the Assyrian Empire within seventy years of Sennacherib's death can be partly attributed to later kings ignoring Sennacherib's policies and reforms. Elayi, writing in 2018, concluded that Sennacherib was different both from the traditional negative image of him and from the perfect image the king wanted to convey himself through his inscriptions, but that elements of both were true. According to Elayi, Sennacherib was "certainly intelligent, skillful, with an ability of adaptation", but "his sense of piety was contradictory, as, on the one hand, he impiously destroyed the statues of gods and temples of Babylon while, on the other hand, he used to consult the gods before acting and prayed to them". Elayi believes Sennacherib's greatest flaw was "his irascible, vindictive and impatient character" and that he, when emotional, could be pushed to make irrational decisions.

In 2011, a huge slope was discovered in Qasr Shemamok (Kilizu) in Erbil governorate, with a multi-step staircase of very low height, the steps are built of proud bricks, and a cuneiform text was found on one of the proud bricks with which the stairs were built bearing the name of the Assyrian king Sennacherib. During the French excavations, many cuneiform inscriptions were found, most of which bear a text mentioning one of the king's titles, mentioning the construction of wall and a palace in the city.

== Titles ==
The following titulature is used by Sennacherib in early accounts of his 703 BC Babylonian campaign:

Sennacherib, great king, mighty king, king of Assyria, king without rival, righteous shepherd, favorite of the great gods, prayerful shepherd, who fears the great gods, protector of righteousness, lover of justice, who lends support, who comes to the aid of the cripple and aims to do good deeds, perfect hero, mighty man, first among all kings, neckstock that bends the insubmissive, who strikes the enemy like a thunderbolt, Ashur, the great mountain, has bestowed upon me an unrivalled kingship and has made my weapons mightier than the weapons of all other rulers sitting on daises.

This variant of the titulature is used in an inscription from the Southwest Palace at Nineveh written after Sennacherib's 700 BC Babylonian campaign:

Sennacherib, the great king, the mighty king, king of the universe, king of Assyria, king of the four quarters (of the world); favorite of the great gods; the wise and crafty one; strong hero, first among all princes; the flame that consumes the insubmissive, who strikes the wicked with the thunderbolt. Assur, the great god, has intrusted to me an unrivaled kingship, and has made powerful my weapons above (all) those who dwell in palaces. From the upper sea of the setting sun to the lower sea of the rising sun, all princes of the four quarters (of the world) he has brought in submission to my feet.

== See also ==
- Azekah Inscription
- Halamata Cave
- Lachish reliefs
- List of Assyrian kings
- List of biblical figures identified in extra-biblical sources
- Military history of the Neo-Assyrian Empire
- Sinharib
- Sennacherib's Annals

== Notes ==
Sennacherib Sargonid dynasty Born: c. 745 BC Died: 20 October 681 BC
Preceded by Sargon II	King of Assyria; 705 – 681 BC	Succeeded by Esarhaddon
Preceded by Sargon II	King of Babylon; 705 – 704/703 BC	Succeeded by Marduk-zakir-shumi II
Preceded by Mushezib-Marduk	King of Babylon (de facto, Babylon destroyed); 689 – 681 BC	Succeeded by Esarhaddon
