= Babylonian Chronicles =

Tablets recording Babylonian history

Babylonian Chronicles

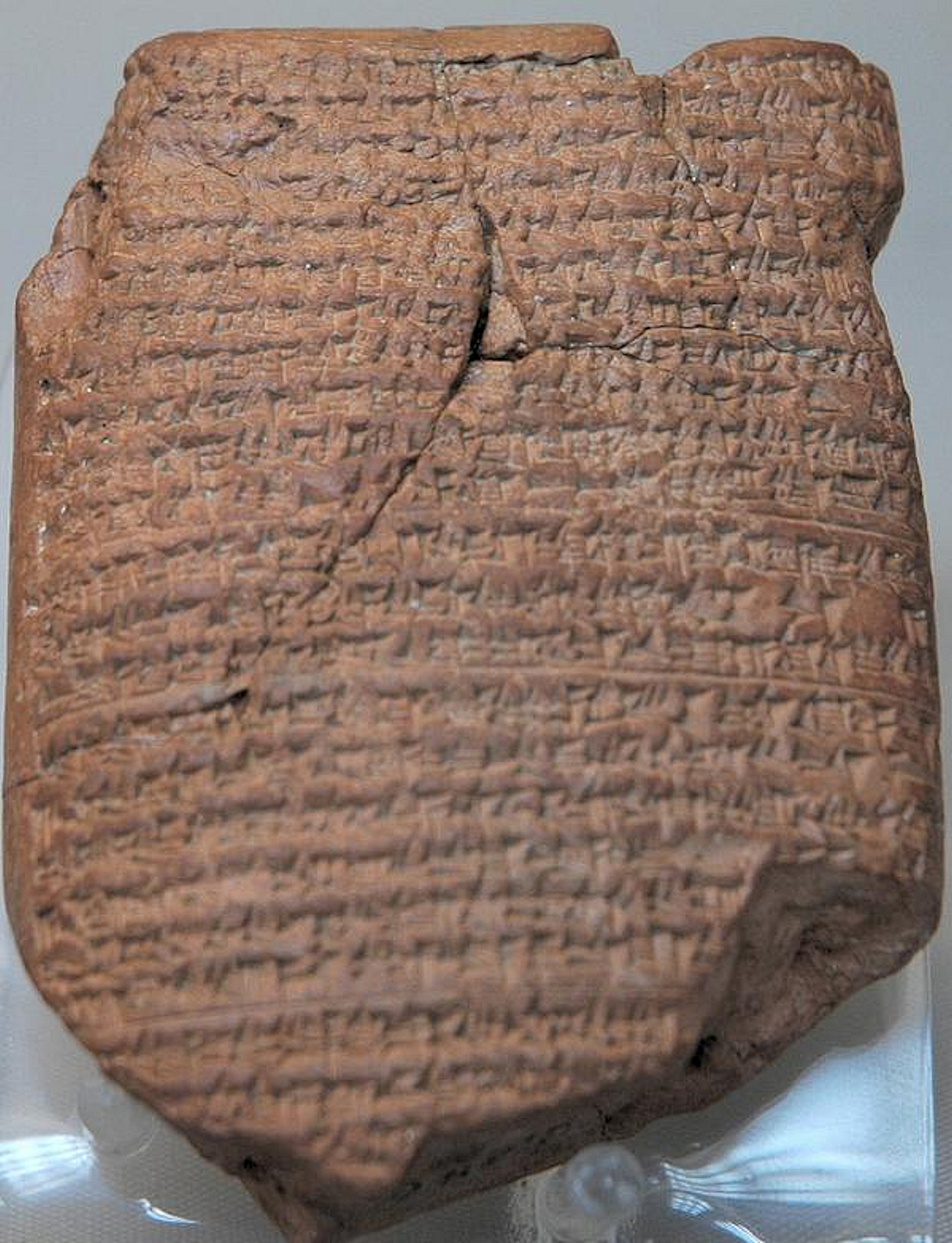
Early Years of Nebuchadnezzar chronicle, dated 590 BCE (ABC 05)

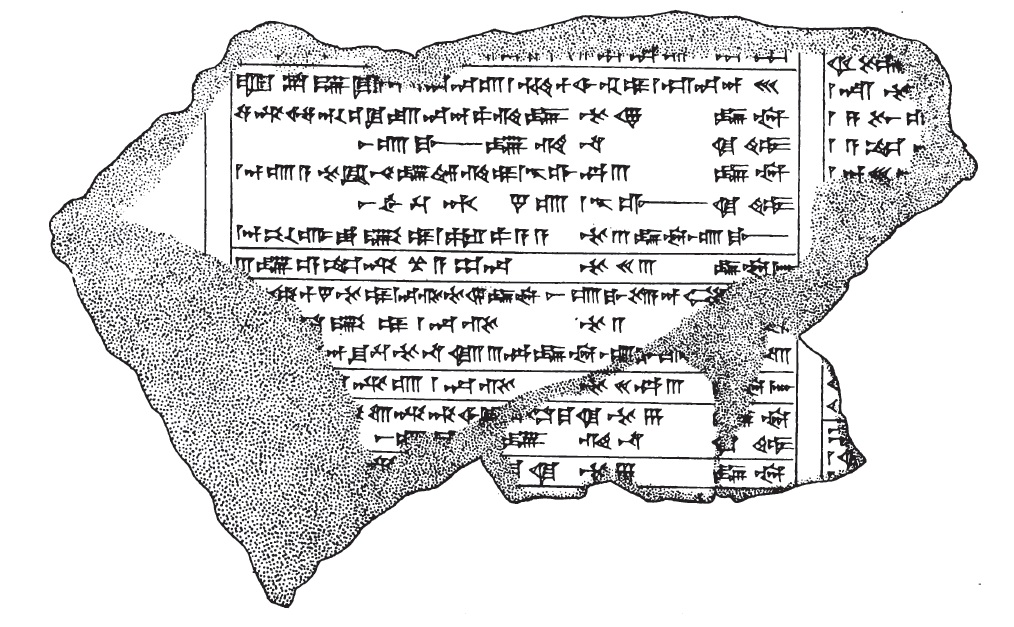
L. W. King’s line-art for a fragment (K. 8532) of the Dynastic Chronicle

The Babylonian Chronicles are a loosely defined series of about 45 tablets recording major events in Babylonian history.

They represent one of the first steps in the development of ancient historiography. The Babylonian Chronicles are written in Babylonian cuneiform and date from the reign of Nabonassar until the Parthian Period. The tablets were composed by Babylonian astronomers ("Chaldaeans") who probably used the Babylonian astronomical diaries as their source.

Almost all of the tablets were identified as chronicles once in the collection of the British Museum, having been acquired via antiquities dealers from unknown excavations undertaken during the 19th century. Only three of the chronicles are provenanced.

The Chronicles provide the "master narrative" for large blocks of current Babylonian history.

== Discovery and publication ==
The chronicles are thought to have been transferred to the British Museum after 19th century excavations in Babylon, and subsequently left undeciphered in the archives for decades. The first chronicle to be published was BM 92502 (ABC1) in 1887 by Theophilus Pinches under the title "The Babylonian Chronicle." This was followed in 1923 by the publication of the Fall of Nineveh Chronicle (ABC 3), in 1924 by Sidney Smith's publication of the Esarhaddon Chronicle (ABC 14), the Akitu Chronicle (ABC 16) and the Nabonidus Chronicle (ABC 7), and in 1956 by Donald Wiseman's publication of four further tablets including the Nebuchadnezzar Chronicle (ABC 5).

== Chronicles ==
=== Numbering systems ===
ABC – A.K. Grayson, Assyrian and Babylonian Chronicles (1975)

CM – Jean-Jacques Glassner, Chroniques Mésopotamiennes (1993) (translated as Mesopotamian Chronicles, 2004)

BCHP – R. J. van der Spek, Irving L. Finkel, Reinhard Pirngruber & Kathryn Stevens, Babylonian Chronicles of the Hellenistic Period (2025)

BM – British Museum Number

=== List ===
Chronicle	ABC	CM	BCHP	BM	Provenanced
Dynastic chronicle (translation) (another version of Column 5)	18	3			Yes
Royal chronicle of Lagaš		6			
Weidner chronicle (translation)	19	38			Yes
Early kings chronicle (translation)	20	39,40			
Tummal chronicle		7			
Uruk chronicle of the kings of Ur		48			
Assyrian Eponym List (2nd millennium)		8			
Market prices chronicle (translation)	23	50			
Synchronic history (translation and another translation)	21	10			Yes
Chronicle P (translation and another translation)	22	45			
Enlil-nirari chronicle		11			
Arik-den-ili chronicle		12			
Walker chronicle	25	46			
Tukulti-Ninurta chronicle		13			
Aššur-reša-iši chronicle		14			
Tiglath-pileser I chronicle		15			
Eclectic chronicle (translation)	24	47			
Religious chronicle (translation)	17	51			
Assyrian Eponym List (1st millennium)		9			
Nabu-šuma-iškun		52			
From Nabu-Nasir to Šamaš-šuma-ukin (translation)	1	16		92502	
From Nabu-Nasir to Esarhaddon	1B	17		75976	
Esarhaddon chronicle (translation)	14	18		25091	
Šamaš-šuma-ukin chronicle (translation) (another translation)	15	19		96273	
Akitu chronicle (translation)	16	20		86379	
Early Years of Nabopolassar chronicle (translation)	2	21		25127	
Fall of Nineveh chronicle (translation)	3	22		21901	
Late years of Nabopolassar chronicle (translation)	4	23		22047	
Early Years of Nebuchadnezzar chronicle (translation)	5	24		21946	
Third year of Neriglissar chronicle (translation)	6	25		25124	
Nabonidus chronicle (text and translation)	7	26		35382	
Chronographic document on Nabonidus		53			
Artaxerxes III chronicle (translation)	9	28			
Cyrus cylinder	17			90920	
Alexander chronicle (text and translation)	8	29	1		
Alexander and Arabia chronicle (text and translation)			2		
Diadochi chronicle (text and translation)	10	30	3		
Alexander and Artaxerxes (translation)			4		
Antiochus I and Sin temple chronicle (text and translation)	11	32	5		
Ruin of Esagila chronicle (text and translation)			6		
Antiochus, Bactria, and India chronicle (text and translation)	13A	36	7		
Juniper garden chronicle (text and translation)			8		
End of Seleucus I chronicle (text and translation)	12	33	9		
Seleucid Accessions chronicle (text and translation)	13	34	10		
Invasion of Ptolemy III chronicle (text and translation)			11		
Seleucus III chronicle (text and translation)	13B	35	12		
Politai chronicle (text and translation)			13		
Greek Community chronicle (text and translation)			14		
Gold theft chronicle (text and translation)			15		
Document on land and tithes (text and translation)			16		
Judicial chronicle (text and translation)		37	17		
Bagayasha chronicle			18		
Chronicle concerning an Arsacid king (text and translation)			19		
Euphrates chronicle (text and translation)			20		

== See also ==
- List of artifacts significant to the Bible
- Chronology of the ancient Near East

== Literature ==
- Leo Oppenheim's translation of the Nabonidus Chronicle can be found in J. B. Pritchard (ed.) Ancient Near Eastern Texts Relating to the Old Testament (= ANET; 1950, 1955, 1969).
- The standard edition is A.K. Grayson, Assyrian and Babylonian Chronicles (= ABC; 1975; ISBN 978-1-57506-049-1).
- A translation of Chronicle 25, discovered after the publication of ABC, was published by C.B.F. Walker "Babylonian Chronicle 25: A Chronicle of the Kassite and Isin Dynasties", in G. van Driel e.a. (eds.): Zikir Šumim: Assyriological Studies Presented to F.R. Kraus on the Occasion of His Seventieth Birthday (= Fs. Kraus; 1982).
- John Brinkman revises Grayson's reading of ABC 1 in: "The Babylonian Chronicle revisited" in T. Abusch, J. Huehnergard, P. Steinkeller (eds.): Lingering over Words. Studies in Ancient Near Eastern literature in Honor of William L. Moran (1990 Atlanta; ISBN 978-1-55540-502-1).
- Fragments of the chronicles that are relevant to the study of the Bible, can be found in William W. Hallo (ed.), The Context of Scripture, volume 1 (2003 Leiden and Boston; ISBN 978-90-04-10618-5). This book also contains the Weidner Chronicle.
- A recent update of ABC is Jean-Jacques Glassner, Mesopotamian Chronicles (= CM; 2004, ISBN 978-1-58983-090-5; French version 1993, ISBN 978-2-251-33918-4).
- An even more recent update of ABC is Amélie Kuhrt, The Persian Empire: A Corpus of Sources of the Achaemenid Period (Routledge, 2007; ISBN 978-0-415-55279-0).
- The chronicles of the Hellenistic Period are published in R. J. van der Spek, Irving L. Finkel, Reinhard Pirngruber & Kathryn Stevens, Babylonian Chronographic Texts from the Hellenistic Period (SBL Press, 2025; ISBN 978-1-62837-589-3).
- An exposition that the Babylonian Chronicle should be regarded as a literary interpretation of the past in Waerzeggers, Caroline. "Writing History Under Empire: The Babylonian Chronicle Reconsidered", Journal of Ancient Near Eastern History, vol. 8, no. 1-2, 2021, pp. 279-317.
