= Appalaya =

Appalaya was "the king of the Zari people". His name is known from texts which were discovered in the acropolis of Susa. These texts are attributed to the first quarter of the 6th century BC. This name is very similar to Aplāya, grandson of Marduk-apal-iddina II, king of Babylon who was deported from Elam by Humban-nikash II. It is, however, likely that his tribe was from an Aramaean or Chaldean origin, who were inhabitants of southwestern Khuzistan.

== Bibliography ==
- Tavernier, Jan. Some Thoughts on Neo-Elamite Chronology. ARTA, 2004.
- Vallat, Francois. Elam: The History of Elam. Encyclopaedia Iranica, vol. VIII pp. 301-313. London/New York, 1998.
- Henkelman, wouter. Defining Neo-Elamite History. ARTA, 2003.
