= Crimes and Sacrileges of Nabu-šuma-iškun =

Ancient Mesopotamian text

The Crimes and Sacrileges of Nabû-šuma-iškun is an ancient Mesopotamian chronicle extant in a single late-Babylonian copy (Note: Excavation number W22660/0.) from Hellenistic Uruk of the library of the exorcist, or āšipu, Anu-ikṣụr. The vitriol levied at the mid-eighth century BCE Babylonian king, Nabû-šuma-iškun, for his acts of sacrilege against cults in Babylon, Borsippa, Kutha, and Uruk, together with the apparent dynastic change following his regime has led to the view that it was originally a literary construct of the reign of Nabû-nāṣir, his immediate successor.

== The text ==
The single available copy of this work is late, Seleucid era, recovered from the Parthian mound southeast of the Eanna temple complex in Warka and has passages marked with the term ḫe-pí, “broken”, suggesting it was a duplicate of an earlier damaged work where parts of the tablet were unreadable. The fragmentary tablet is arranged in four columns.

The first and fourth columns are especially degraded, with Marduk-apla-uṣur and LÚ kal-di, “Chaldean”, appearing in the first two lines, suggesting the work may have had a preamble referencing the reigns of Marduk-apla-uṣur and Erība-Marduk, the immediate predecessors of Nabû-šuma-iškun who, like him, were leaders of Chaldean tribes from Southern Mesopotamia, or perhaps detailing his earlier infamy during their reigns. The narrative emphasizes the tensions between the Arameans and Chaldeans and, in the central two columns, lists his increasingly impious and foolhardy actions, beginning with his apparent reluctance to confront the Aramean foe, “He did not go out again to do battle or go on campaign in it (his land).”

The underlying theme of the work is the inversion of traditional role of a Babylonian King, where one charged with defending the cults, seeks to replace it, disrupting rituals, such as that of the akitu rites and calendar, defiling priests of their purity, with forbidden foodstuffs (leeks) and mutilating the fingers of apprentices. By abolishing the privileges of the citizens of Babylon, Borsippa and Kutha, he is reversing the conventional position of the king and instead of providing gifts to the temples, he expropriates from their endowments gifts for foreigners. His failure to maintain the civic and cultic order resulted in a widespread destruction for the people and the land, a critique which is repeated in other period literature such as the Advice to a prince and the Epic of the plague-god Erra.

=== Primary publications ===
- E. von Weiher (1984). "Marduk-apla-uṣur und Nabû-šum-iškun in einem spätbabylonischen Fragment aus Uruk". BagM 15. pp. 197–224. photo, transliteration, translation
- E. von Weiher (1984). SpTU III. pp. 197–224. line art, new transliteration, translation.
- J.-J. Glassner (1993). Chroniques mésopotamiennes. pp. 235–240. no. 52, “Chronographic Document Concerning Nabû-šuma-iškun”, translation.
- S. W. Cole (1994). "The Crimes and Sacrileges of Nabû-šuma-iškun". Zeitschrift für Assyriologie und Vorderasiatische Archäologie. 84 (2). doi:10.1515/zava.1994.84.2.220. S2CID 161425364. transliteration and translation
