= Merodach (disambiguation) =

Merodach (or Bel-Merodach) an alternative name of Marduk, a Mesopotamian god.

Merodach may also refer to :

- Evil-Merodach, an alternative name for Amel-Marduk, the son and successor of Nebuchadnezzar II, king of Babylon
- Merodach Baladan, (or Marduk-apla-iddina), the name of two kings of Babylonia
- Merodach (Dungeons & Dragons), the name of a devil in the Dungeons & Dragons role playing game

== See also ==
- Marduk (disambiguation)
