= Marduk-apla-iddina =

Marduk-apla-iddina or Merodach-Baladan may refer to:

- Marduk-apla-iddina I, king of Babylon ca. 1171–1159 BC
- Marduk-apla-iddina II (died 702 BC), Babylonian king
