= Van der Spek =

Van der Spek or Van der Speck (older spelling) is a toponymic surname of Dutch origin. The surname describes someone living near a "spek", or a simple turf-covered wooden bridge meant for livestock. Notable people with the surname include:

- Bert van der Spek (born 1949), Dutch ancient historian
- Florens van der Spek (born 1992), Dutch politician
- Fred van der Spek (1923–2016), Dutch politician
