= Marduk-bel-zeri =

Marduk-bēl-zēri
- King of Babylon
- Reign: 8th century BC
- Predecessor: Ninurta-apla-X
- Successor: Marduk-apla-uṣur
- House: Dynasty of E (mixed dynasties)

Marduk-bēl-zēri, inscribed in cuneiform as ^{d}AMAR.UTU.EN.NUMUN (Note: Tablet YBC 11546 in the Yale Babylonian Collection.) (Note: Dynastic Chronicle vi 2.) or ^{md}ŠID.EN.[x] (Note: Synchronistic King List, tablet VAT 11345 (KAV 13), 2.) and meaning 'Marduk (is) lord of descendants (lit. seed)', was one of the kings of Babylon during the turmoil following the Assyrian invasions of Šamši-Adad V (ca. 824 – 811 BC). He is identified on a Synchronistic King List fragment as Marduk-[bēl]-x, which gives his place in the sequence and reigned around the beginning of the 8th century BC. He was a rather obscure monarch and the penultimate predecessor of Erība-Marduk who was to restore order after years of chaos.

== Biography ==
He is known from a single economic text from the southern city of Udāni dated to his accession year (MU.SAG.NAM.LUGAL). This city was a satellite cultic center to Uruk, of uncertain location but possibly near Marad, later to be known as Udannu, associated with the deities ^{d}IGI.DU (the two infernal Nergals) and Bēlet-Eanna (associated with Ištar). The document records the parts of a chariot including the wagon pole (mašaddu) which had been entrusted by Belšunu, the šangû or chief administrator of Udāni to the temple of ^{d}IGI.DU (Igišta, Palil?). He is tentatively restored to the Dynastic Chronicle where he is described as "a soldier" (^{lú}aga.[úš]) but his circumstances are otherwise unknown.
