= Marduk-apla-usur =

Marduk-apla-uṣur
- King of Babylon
- Reign: 8th century BC
- Predecessor: Marduk-bēl-zēri
- Successor: Erība-Marduk
- House: Dynasty of E (mixed dynasties)

Marduk-apla-uṣur, inscribed ^{d}AMAR.UTU-A-ŠE[Š], (Note: Dynastic Chronicle (ADD 888) vi 3’-5’.) or ^{md}ŠID-A-[x], (Note: Synchronistic King List fragment VAT 11345 (KAV 13), 3’.) meaning 'O Marduk, protect the heir' was an 8th century BC Chaldean tribal leader who ruled as King of Babylon after the reign of Marduk-bēl-zēri. He is known only from three inscriptions and ruled during a period of chaos. He should not be confused with the Marduk-apla-uṣur who ruled Suḫi on the middle Euphrates and paid tribute to Salmānu-ašarēdu III a generation or so earlier.

== Biography ==
His Assyrian contemporaries were probably Salmānu-ašarēdu IV (783 - 773 BC) and/or Ashur-dan III (773 - 755 BC) and the latter one is known to have campaigned in northern Babylonia on three occasions: 771 BC (against Gannanāti), 770 BC (against Marad) and 767 BC (against Gannanāti again). Into the vacuum created by the devastation, the southern Chaldeans were able to rise to power and he seems to have been the first member of the tribal group to have made pretensions to the Babylonian throne. His place in the sequence of kings is known from a Synchronistic King List fragment. His length of reign and dynastic affiliation are unknown, as he was recorded as belonging to a separate one from his predecessor and successor, but the Dynastic Chronicle records that "the dynasty of Chaldea was terminated. Its kingship was transferred to the Sealand," and, as his successor was Erība-Marduk, the archetypal ancestor figure of the later Chaldean monarchs, it is surmised his origins were with a different Chaldean group than that of Erība-Marduk's Bīt-Yakin tribe.

He is mentioned in a fragmentary Neo-Babylonian narrative text from Uruk (Note: Chronographic document concerning Nabu-šuma-iškun at Livius, excavation number W 22660/0, published as SpTU III no. 58 and CM 52 in J. J. Glassner's "Chronique Mésopotamiennes," 1993, pp. 235–240.) ("The Crimes and Sacrileges of Nabu-šuma-iškun") which provides no further enlightenment about his time apart from a passing observation that "forced labor and corvée were imposed."
