= Land grant to Marduk-zākir-šumi kudurru =

Mesopotamian stele

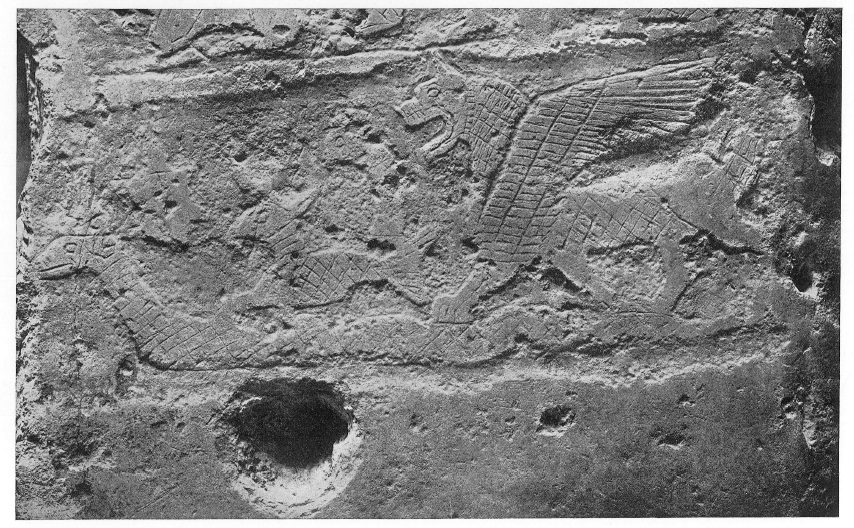
- Detail from the Land grant to Marduk-zakir-sumi kudurru
- Material: Limestone
- Height: 91 cm
- Width: 51 cm
- Created: c. 1165 BC
- Discovered: before 1875; Baghdad, Baghdad Governorate, Iraq

The Land grant to Marduk-zākir-šumi kudurru is an ancient Mesopotamian narû, or entitlement stele, recording the gift (irīmšu) of 18 bur 2 eše (about 120 hectares or 300 acres) of corn-land by Kassite king of Babylon Marduk-apla-iddina I (c. 1171–1159 BC) to his bēl pīḫati (inscribed ^{lú}EN NAM and meaning "person responsible"), or a provincial official. The monument is significant in part because it shows the continuation of royal patronage in Babylonia during a period when most of the near East was beset by collapse and confusion, and in part due to the lengthy genealogy of the beneficiary, which links him to his illustrious ancestors.

== The stele ==
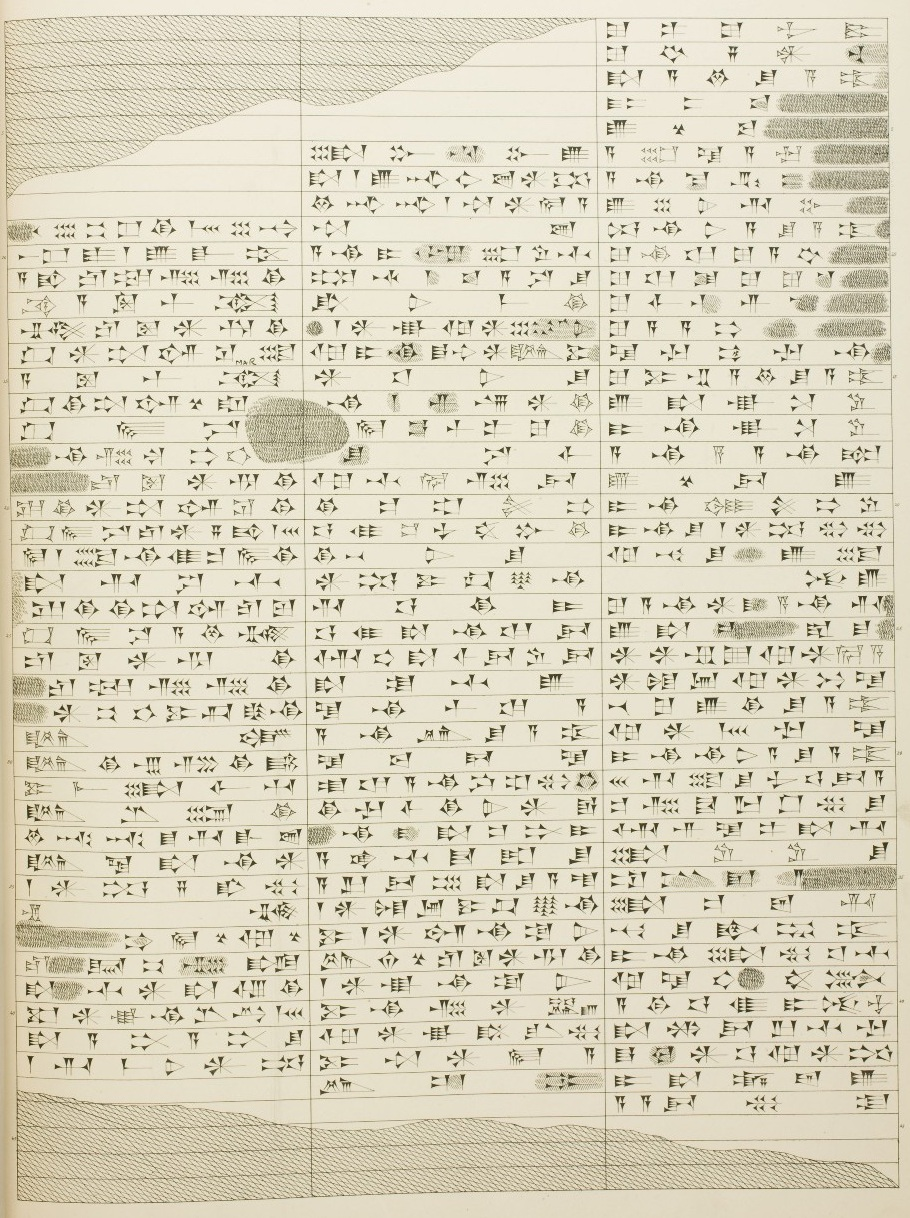
Rawlinson’s line-art for the Marduk-zākir-šumi kudurru

The monument is a large rectangular block of limestone with a base of 51 by 30.5 cm and a height of 91 cm, or around 3 feet, with a broken top making it the tallest of the extant kudurrus and has intentionally flattened sides. It was recovered from the western bank of the Tigris opposite Baghdad and acquired by George Smith for the British Museum while on his 1873–74 expedition to Nineveh sponsored by the Daily Telegraph. It was originally given the collection reference D.T. 273 and later that of BM 90850. The face has three registers featuring eighteen symbolic representations of gods (listed below identifying the corresponding deity) and the back has three columns of text (line-art pictured right).

First register:

- Crescent moon, Sîn
- Solar disc, Šamaš
- Eight-pointed star, Ištar
- Lamp, Nusku
- Walking bird, Bau
- Eagle/vulture-headed mace, Zababa
- Lion-headed mace, Nergal
- Squatting dog, Gula
- Scorpion, Išḫara
- Reversed yoke on a shrine, Ninḫursag

Second register:

- Bird on a perch, the Kassite deities Šuqamuna & Šumalia
- Reclining ox beneath lightning fork, Adad
- Spear-head behind horned dragon, Marduk
- Wedge supported by horned dragon before shrine, Nabû

Third register:

- Horned serpent spanning register, uncertain
- Turtle, uncertain
- Ram-headed crook above goat-fish, Ea
- Winged dragon stepping on hind part of serpent, uncertain

The land grant was situated west of the river Tigris in the province of Ingur-Ištar, one of perhaps twenty-two pīḫatus or provinces known from the Kassite period, and was bordered by estates belonging to the (house of) Bīt-Nazi-Marduk and Bīt-Tunamissaḫ, perhaps Kassite nobility.

=== Cast of characters ===
- Marduk-apla-iddina, the king, donor
- Marduk-zākir-šumi, bēl-pīḫati, beneficiary. His secondary titles included ˹pa˺-˹qí]-id ÉRIN ^{gi}DUSU: officer of the troops of the charioteers

His ancestors:

- Nabû-nadin-aḫḫē, his father
- Rimeni-Marduk, grandfather
- Uballissu-Marduk, great-grandfather, an accountant during the reign of Kurigalzu II, whose cylinder seals shed further light on his ancestors, naming his forebears Uššur-ana-Marduk as šandabakku or governor of Nippur and Usi-ana-nuri-^{?} as viceroy of Dilmun (ancient Bahrain)
- Arad-Ea, patriarchal figure of the clan and his great-great-grandfather

Witnesses:

- Ninurta-apla-iddina, son of Adad-naṣir šakin or governor of the province of Engur-Ištar
- Nabû-naṣir, son of Nazi-Marduk, sukallu a court official, messenger or vizier
- Nabû-šakin-šumi, son of Arad-Ea, ^{lú}DU.GAB, "charioteer"

=== Principal publications ===
- H. C. Rawlinson, ed. (1875). Cuneiform Inscriptions of Western Asia; Vol. IV: A Selection from the Miscellaneous Inscriptions of Assyria (1st ed.). p. 38. line-art and transcription into Assyrian characters
- George Smith (1875). Assyrian Discoveries. Scribner, Armstrong & co . pp. 236–241. translation
- H. C. Rawlinson, ed. (1891). Cuneiform Inscriptions of Western Asia; Vol. IV: A Selection from the Miscellaneous Inscriptions of Assyria (2nd ed.). p. 41. revised line-art
- F. E. Peiser (1896). "Babylonische Urkunden aus der dritten Dynastie". In K. B. Schrader (ed.). Keilinschriftliche Bibliothek, IV. Reuther & Reichard. pp. 61–63. transliteration and translation
- W. J. Hinke (1911). Selected Babylonian Kudurru Inscriptions. E. J. Brill. pp. 19–21. no. 4, line-art
- L. W. King (1912). Babylonian Boundary Stones and Memorial-Tablets in the British Museum. British Museum. pp. 24–29., pls. 31-42 transliteration, translation and photographs
- Ursula Seidl (1989). Die Babylonischen Kudurru-Reliefs: Symbole Mesopotamischer Gottheiten. Academic Press Fribourg. pp. 39–40. no. 62
