= Marduk-zakir-shumi II =

Babylonian nobleman

Marduk-zâkir-šumi II was a Babylonian nobleman who served briefly as King of Babylon for a few months in 703 BC, following a revolt against the rule of the Assyrian king Sennacherib. He was soon overthrown and replaced by the former Chaldean king, Marduk-apla-iddina II. He was the son of Arad-Ea (or Arad-Enlil).

Preceded by Sennacherib	King of Babylon; 703 BC	Succeeded by Marduk-apla-iddina II
