= Babylonian Religion and Mythology =

1899 book by L. W. King

Babylonian religion and mythology by L.W. King

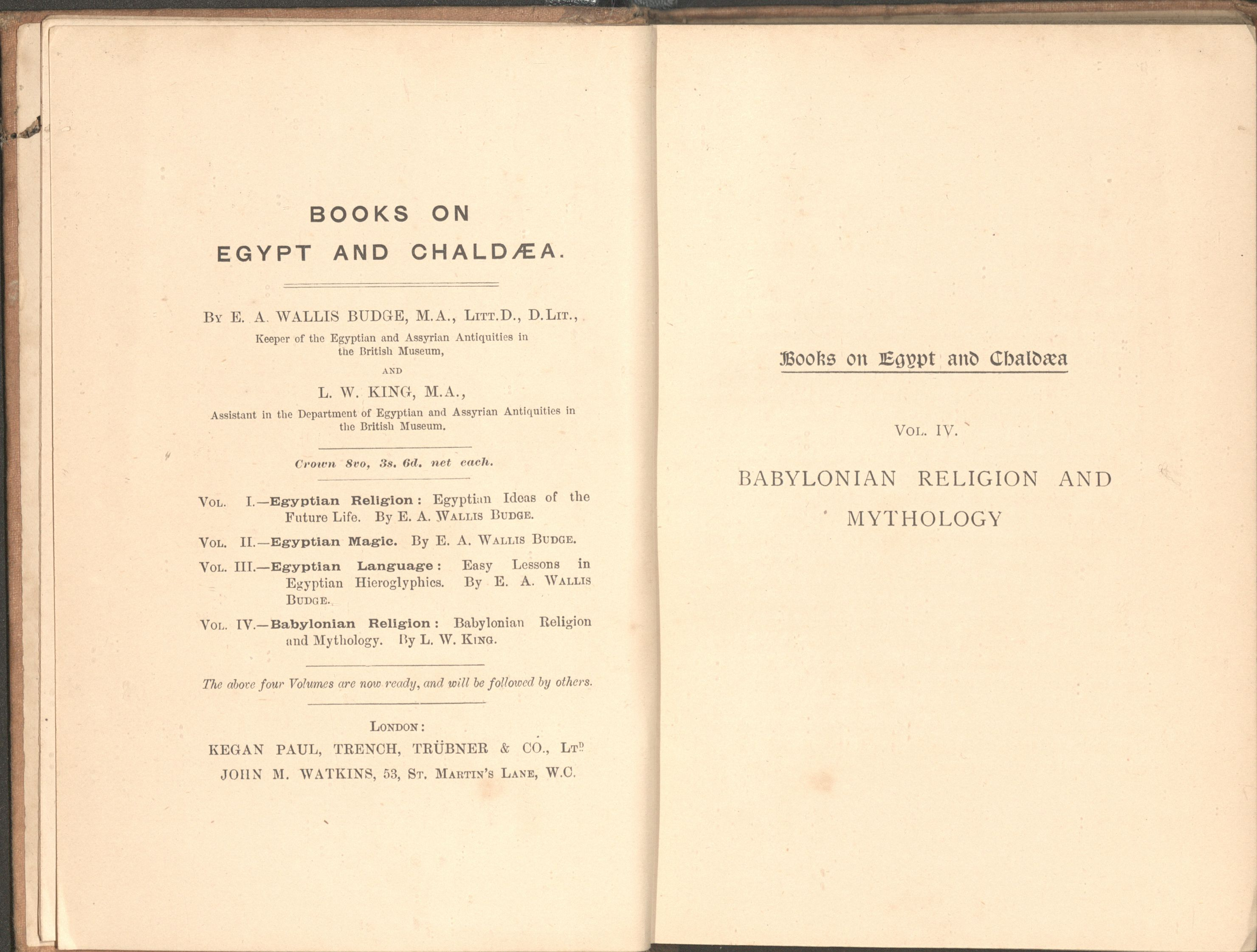
Title page of the book

Babylonian Religion and Mythology is a scholarly book written in 1899 by the English archaeologist and Assyriologist L. W. King (1869-1919). This book provides an in-depth analysis of the religious system of ancient Babylon, researching its intricate connection with the mythology that shaped the Babylonians' understanding of their world. It examines the psychism and thought processes of the Babylonian people, covering the main beliefs that were central to their lives and culture. The book aims to explain the foundational myths and religious practices that played a significant role in Babylonian civilization.

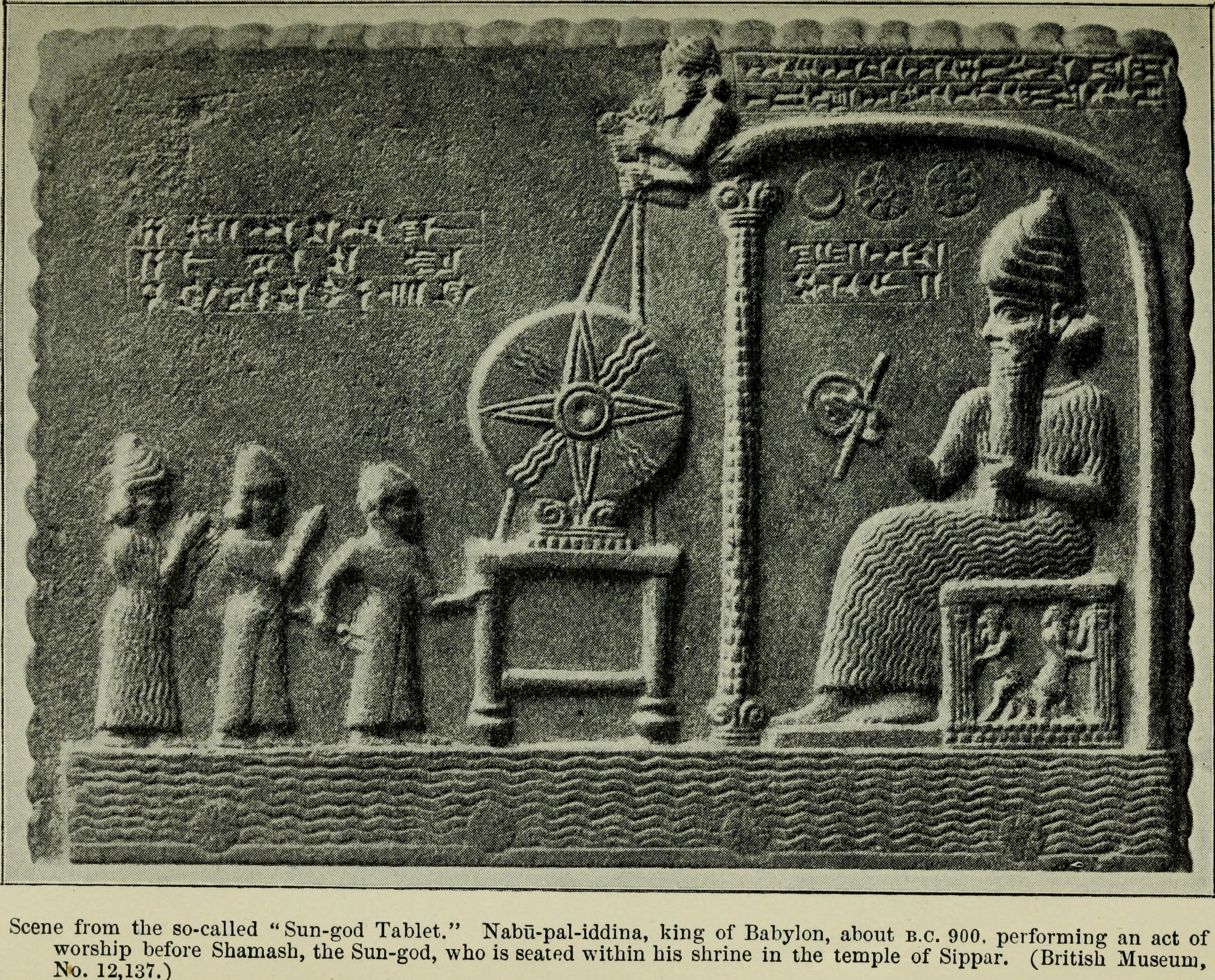
Sun-God tablet

== Context ==
Babylon was flourishing between the 18th and 6th centuries BCE under King Nebuchadnezzar II before its fall in 539 BCE to the persian empire. Western interest in Babylon began to emerge in the 19th century, particularly after the decimperment of cuneiform in the mid-1800s, which allowed scholars to access ancient Mesopotamian texts. Early archaeological expeditions, notably those led by British archaeologist Sir Austen Henry Layard and Robert Koldewey unearthed significant archaeological findings, which added to our understanding of ancient Mesopotamian civilizations. Layard conducted excavations at Nineveh, the ancient capital of the Neo-assyrian Empire, while Koldewey uncovered the Ishtar Gate of Babylon, one of the city's most decorated structures. While Layard is most known for his discoveries at Nineveh he also published a book in 1849, named Nineveh and Its Remains, which introduced the Western world to Assyrian and Babylonian civilization. A French-German Assyriologist, Julius Oppert also contributed in the early study of Babylon by translating Babylonian legal texts, like the Code of Hammurabi. In 1898, another scholar Morris Jastrow Jr. published The Religion of Babylonia and Assyria. The book explores the gods, myths, and rituals at the heart of Babylonian and Assyrian culture, highlighting major deities such as Marduk, Ishtar, and Enlil. It also discusses religious practices, including temple worship, sacrifices, and divination. Drawing from cuneiform texts, Jastrow links these beliefs to the everyday life, political structures, and ethical views of these ancient civilizations.

L.W. King studied Assyriology at King's College, focusing on ancient Mesopotamian civilizations, particularly their languages, literature, and culture. He gained expertise in the Assyrian language, through his specialized studies, field work and access to Assyrian collections, which he needed for interpreting cuneiform texts and inscriptions. King analyzed various ancient Near Eastern texts, including legal codes, religious writings, and administrative documents, which helped him understand the social and political structures of the time. His field research in Mesopotamia involved examining archaeological sites, inscriptions, and artifacts, giving him firsthand knowledge of the material culture and religious practices of ancient Babylon and Assyria. He also looked into the broader cultural context, including mythology, religion, and daily life. L.W. King published several works, including First Steps in Assyrian, which introduced the basics of the Assyrian language and expanded the understanding of ancient Near Eastern culture. King also authored The Letters and Inscriptions of Hammurabi, interpreting inscriptions from the sixth king of the First Babylonian Dynasty, which focused on the legal, administrative, and religious aspects of his reign. L. W. King authored the volume Babylonian Religion and Mythology to address gaps in existing scholarship and incorporate recent research developments.

== Contents ==
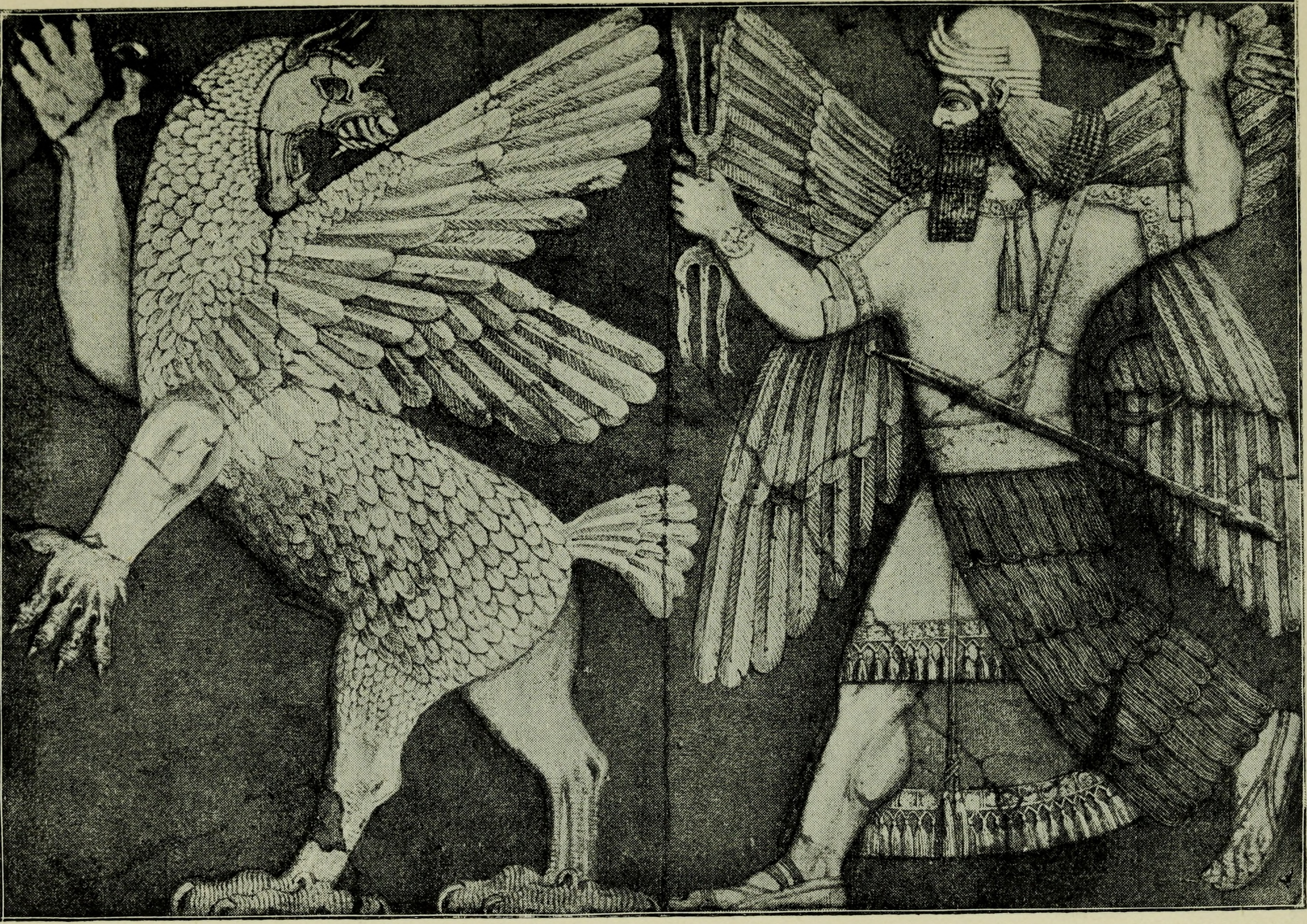
The creation of heaven

The book is divided into six chapters, each about different aspects of Babylonian mythology and religion.

- The first chapter describes the gods of Babylon, such as Marduk, Ishtar, Anu, Ea, Nergal, Shamash, and Enlil, and studies their roles, attributes, and associated myths. Marduk, the chief god, symbolizes order and kingship through his defeat of Tiamat in the Enuma Elish. The predominantly male pantheon indicates cultural androcentrism, with female deities holding limited independent power. Each god had a dedicated temple, reflecting the diversity and specialization of Babylonian religious practices.
- The second chapter examines Babylonian cosmic geography and cosmology, detailing the structure of the universe, including heaven, earth, and the underworld. The Babylonians viewed the Earth as an upside-down boat or bowl, with a flat surface for human habitation and a solid dome of heavens surrounding it.
- The third chapter delves into creation myths, focusing on the Enuma Elish, which explains the origins of the world and divine order. It compares Babylonian myths with those of other cultures, like the Sumerians and Hebrews, and discusses the influence of Babylonian stories on the Hebrew Bible.
- The fourth chapter recounts the Babylonian flood myth, drawing parallels with the biblical story of Noah's Ark and examining its symbolic and theological implications.
- The fifth chapter focuses on the Epic of Gilgamesh, detailing the adventures of Gilgamesh, king of Uruk, and his companion Enkidu. It analyzes themes of friendship, mortality, and the human condition, culminating in Gilgamesh's quest for immortality and his realization that true legacy lies in one's actions and their lasting impact.
- The final chapter examines the religious and ethical duties in Babylonian society, highlighting the intimate relationship between humans and their gods. It discusses how rituals, social obligations, and legal codes were influenced by religious beliefs. Each Babylonian had a patron god and goddess whose protection was vital, and devotion to these deities was essential to avoid misfortune and estrangement.

Through these chapters, the book offers a thorough analysis of ancient Babylonian traditions, providing a deeper understanding of their cultural heritage and enduring influence.

== Reception ==
L.W. King’s Babylonian Religion and Mythology was regarded within academic circles as a clear examination of Babylonian religious practices and was appreciated for drawing thoughtful comparisons with Hebrew religion. The work was praised for its meticulous analysis and breadth of approach, becoming a seminal reference in the field of Near Eastern studies.

Since the publication of King’s work, the study of Babylonian religion and mythology has been shaped by new archaeological discoveries and advancements in scholarly methodologies. While King’s book was foundational and remains a respected historical reference, it has been supplemented by more recent studies that provide a nuanced and comprehensive view of Babylonian religion. For instance, Sir E. A. Wallis Budge’s The Babylonian Legends of the Creation offered further insights into Babylonian myths, and the publication of The Babylonian World edited by Gwendolyn Leick in 2008 provided an overview of Babylonian history, culture, and religious practices.

Following the publication of "Babylonian Religion and Mythology," L.W. King continued to focus on ancient Mesopotamian civilizations in his subsequent books. Notable among these are "Egypt and Western Asia in the Light of Recent Discoveries", published in 1907, which compares religious practices across ancient civilizations, including Babylon; In the same year, he published "Chronicles Concerning Early Babylonian Kings", and "A History of Sumer and Akkad" three years later, both of which analyze the religious and mythological aspects of early Mesopotamian rulers. King also authored "Legends of Babylon and Egypt in Relation to Hebrew Tradition" in 1916 studying the connections between Babylonian myths and Hebrew traditions, and "The Seven Tablets of Creation" in 1902 which offered translations and analyses of the Enuma Elish, a central Babylonian creation myth.
