= Marduk (disambiguation) =

Marduk is the historic patron deity of the city of Babylon, in the 18th century BC.

Marduk may also refer to:

== Music ==
- Marduk (band), a Swedish black metal band

== Fiction ==
- Marduk, a fictional character in the video game Sacrifice
- Craig Marduk, a fictional character in the Tekken video game series
- Marduk, a fictional planet in the Empire of Man book series

== See also ==
- Merodach (disambiguation)
