= Nabu-shuma-ishkun =

Nabû-šuma-iškun
- King of Babylon
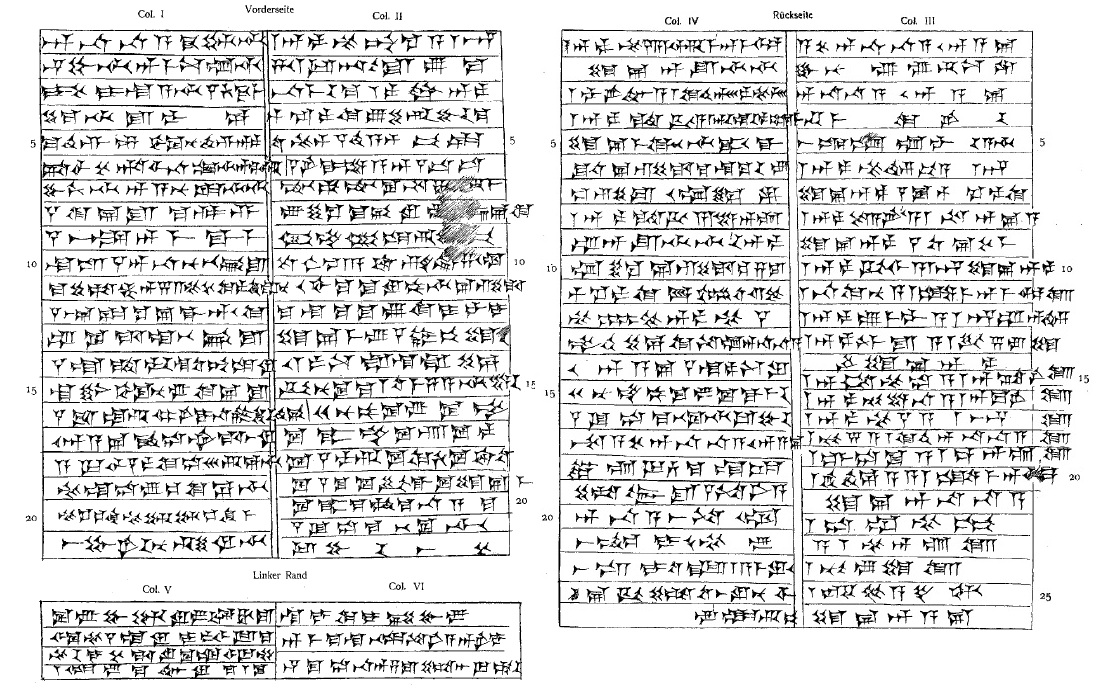
- Line art for a kudurru of the time of Nabû-šuma-iškun (Note: Kudurru VA 3031 (VS I 36).)
- Reign: ca. 761 – 748 BC
- Predecessor: Erība-Marduk
- Successor: Nabû-Nasir
- House: Dynasty of E (mixed dynasties)

Nabû-šuma-iškun, inscribed ^{md}nabû-šuma-iškun^{un}, (Note: Kinglist A, BM 33332, iv 2.) and meaning "Nabû has set a name", was king of Babylon, speculatively ca. 761 – 748 BC (see below for provenance), and ruled during a time of great civil unrest. He came from the Bīt-Dakkūri tribe, (Note: Cylinder of Nabû-šuma-imbi, BM 33428, i 17.) a Chaldean group apparently unrelated to that of his immediate predecessor, Erība-Marduk.

== Biography ==
His place in the sequence of Babylonian rulers is confirmed by an Assyrian Synchronistic Kinglist fragment. (Note: Synchronistic Kinglist fragment, VAT 11345 (published as KAV 13), 5.) A contemporary source for information concerning his reign is found in an inscription of the governor of Borsippa, Nabû-šuma-imbi, which highlights his weakness and the autonomy of his regional officials. This barrel cylinder records the struggle over the control of their fields in the face of the incursions of marauders from Babylon and Dilbat; also Chaldeans and Arameans. At night, the city streets and its temple area were transformed into a battleground. During the fifth and sixth years of the king, the strife was so great that the cultic idol of Nabû was prevented from participating in the Akītu, or new year festival in Babylon. (Note: Chronicle 15, Concerning the Reign of Šamaš-šuma-ukin, BM 96273, 22.) The coincidental recording of years five and six of a no longer legible ruler in the Chronicle of the Market Prices has led this reference to be assigned to him. (Note: The Chronicle of the Market Prices (ABC 23), BM 48498, r 6f.) In the king’s eighth year, Nabû-šuma-imbi was able to install a certain Nabû-mutakkil as a temple official and repair the Ezida temple of Nabû storehouses.

He is the main subject of a chronicle, (Note: Chronographic document concerning Nabu-šuma-iškun, excavation number W 22660/0, CM 52 in J. J. Glassner’s “Chronique Mésopotamiennes,” 1993, pp. 235–240.) "The Crimes and Sacrileges of Nabu-šuma-iškun", uncovered in Uruk in a Seleucid era dwelling belonging to the exorcist Anu-ikṣur on the Parthian mound southeast of the Eanna complex, whose underlying theme is his violation of all moral and legal principles and consequentially – his ignominious demise. His crimes included “burn(ing) alive sixteen Cutheans at Zababa's gate in the heart of Babylon;” “he committed insult and unspeakable slander” of a certain Iltagal-il of the town Dur-ša-Karbi, and “a leek, a thing forbidden in the Ezida, he brought to the temple of Nabû and gave to eat to the one 'entering the temple'(i.e. the priest)," apparently an unforgivable act. Unfortunately the Chronicle was damaged in antiquity so how he met his come-uppance is not preserved. The length of his reign is uncertain, as it is not preserved in chronicle (Note: Dynastic Chronicle vi 9.) or king list references, but his reign is known to have ended in 748 BC as the chronology is fixed from the reign of Nabû-Nasir onward, and there is a legal text (Note: Legal text BM 26528, published as NABU 97-1 no. 11.) recording the sale of a plot of land, and a grain receipt (Note: Grain receipt, MLC 1812, published as BRM 1 2.) dated to his tenth year, and two economic texts (Note: Tablet BM 108527.) (Note: Cattle account, MLC 1813, published as BRM 1 3.) to his thirteenth year.
