= Uballissu-Marduk =

Babylonian accountant and administrator

Transliteration
^{d}nin-súmun nin gal-di

dumu sag an gal-[la^{?}]
sa_{12}-du_{5} maḫ ^{d}en-líl
nam-kù-zu níg-nam-ma šu-du_{7}
lú kin-kin-za ḫé-li
in-di-bi ḫé-sa_{6}
a-ga-na ki^{?} še-er-kán <ḫé>-d[u]
ú-ba-lí-su-^{d}AMAR.UTU
dumu ìr-é-a
um-mi-a níg-kas_{7}
ìr ku-ri-gal-zu lugal kiš

Line art

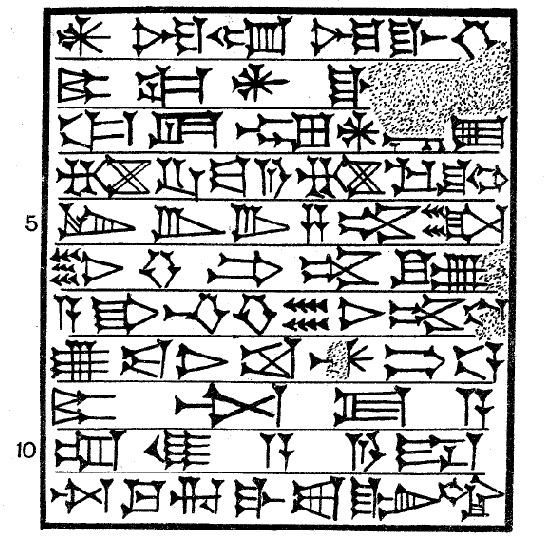
Seal of expert accountant Uballissu-Marduk, from in the British Museum. (Note: Cylinder seal BM 114704.)

Translation
Oh, Ninsumun, mighty lady,

eldest daughter of the great An,
chief land registrar of Enlil,
whose wisdom makes everything perfect:
may he who seeks you rejoice,
and may his going be well,
<so that> after he passed by,
the land is well ordered.
Uballissu-Marduk,
son of Arad-Ea,
expert accountant,
servant of Kurigalzu, king of the world.

Uballissu-Marduk, inscribed ú-ba-lí-su-^{d}AMAR.UTU, meaning “Marduk has kept him alive,” was a Babylonian accountant (niğkas) who rose to the rank of administrator (sanqu) in the Kassite government of Kurigalzu II, ca. 1332-1308 BC short chronology, whose principal sources are his two cylinder seals which detail his religious affiliations and his illustrious genealogy.

== Biography ==
The earlier of his seals (pictured) is a chalcedony cylinder seal with eleven lines of text and one line of five insects. It provides a prayer to the goddess Ninsun and gives his position as “expert accountant.” His other cylinder seal, (Note: Cylinder seal BM 122696.) lists four generations of his ancestors of which Arad-Ea “scholar of accounting” (Sumerian: ummia niğkas) is the first. His father, Uššur-ana-Marduk, had been gá-dub-ba é-[kur^{?}], governor of Nippur, his grandfather, Usi-ana-nuri-^{?}, GIR_{3}.NITA_{2} ^{kur}dilmun^{ki}-a, “regent” or “viceroy” of Dilmun, ancient Bahrain.

His brother was Ile’’e-bulṭa-Marduk, a temple administrator of the Marduk temple in Babylon, as recorded on a copy of a recipe for glass, (Note: Tablet BM 120960.) the original apparently dated to the “Year after that in which Gulkišar became king,” presumed to either refer to the original recipe, or perhaps a fanciful archaism for the tablet.

There seems to have been a rift in the family, with his cousin, Marduk-nādin-aḫḫē, moving to Aššur to take up an appointment as royal scribe to the Assyrian king, Aššūr-uballiṭ (ca. 1353 BC – 1318 BC), as a copy of his obsequious memorial inscription (Note: Memorial tablet, BM 96947, 30’ff.) recalls “[some]one can set [stra]ight [the kinsmen] and clans of my ancestors that have embraced [tre]achery.” Wiggerman suggests that the cause of the division may have been the divided loyalties surrounding the overthrow of Kara-ḫardaš, the son and successor of Burna-Buriaš II, who had been Aššūr-uballiṭ’s grandson or son-in-law. This would have placed Marduk-nādin-aḫḫē’s branch of the family firmly on the side of the Assyrian military intervention, while that of Uballissu-Marduk’s perhaps sided with the usurper Nazi-Bugaš and certainly with Kurigalzu II, an Assyrian-appointee who eventually came to conflict with his erstwhile benefactors, probably riding a wave of public sentiment against their northern neighbors.

Uballissu-Marduk’s descendants were recorded in the genealogy of Marduk-zâkir-šumi, the bēl pīḫati, “person responsible” or provincial governor, who was the beneficiary of a royal gift of corn-land on a kudurru (Note: Kudurru 90850, BBSt V.) in the time of Marduk-apla-iddina I, ca. 1171–1159 BC. These give Rimeni-Marduk as Uballissu-Marduk’s son, Nabû-nādin-aḫē, his grandson, and Marduk-zâkir-šumi, his great-grandson.
