= Eriba-Marduk =

Erība-Marduk
- King of Babylon
- Reign: ca. 769 – 761 BC
- Predecessor: Marduk-apla-uṣur
- Successor: Nabû-šuma-iškun
- House: Dynasty of E (mixed dynasties)

Erība-Marduk, inscribed ^{m}ri-ba [^{d}AMAR.UTU], (Note: Kinglist A, tablet BM 33332, iv 1.) was the king of Babylon, very speculatively ca. 769 – 761 BC. He was one of three Chaldaean tribal leaders to occupy the Babylonian throne during the course of the 8th century and would be looked back as the ancestor figure during future reigns of members of this group. A member of the Bīt-Yakin tribe, who was later to be given the title "re-establisher of the foundation(s) of the land," (Note: Marduk-apla-iddina II: mu-kin išdī(suḫuš) māti(kur).) he was credited with restoring stability to the country after years of turmoil.

== Biography ==
He was described as the son or descendant of Marduk-šakin-šumi, an otherwise unknown individual who one might speculate to have been one of the five unknown kings from the earlier period of interregnum. According to the Dynastic Chronicle, (Note: The Dynastic Chronicle (ABC 18), vi 3–8.) Erība-Marduk was the single member of a dynasty of the Sealand (^{kur}A.AB.BA) and succeeded Marduk-apla-uṣur, the first king clearly identified as Chaldean. He was eventually succeeded by Nabû-šuma-iškun, the sequence of these three kings confirmed by a fragment of an Assyrian Synchronistic Kinglist. (Note: Tablet VAT 11345, published as KAV 13, ii 3'–5'.) There are legal documents dated to his ninth year and to the thirteenth year of his successor, which has led historians to conclude that he must have ascended the throne by 770 BC at the latest, as his successor is known to have ruled until 748 BC. The legal document (Note: Legal document, BM 40548.) dated to his ninth year records the sale of a large expanse of grazing land, eqel ša bīt ikkari, "the field of the house of the farmer". The land apparently bordered property belonging to an Aramean sheikh, or nasīku, evidence of permanent settlement rather than opportunistic raiding by this tribal group.

He participated in the Akītu, or new year festival, first in the beginning of the second year of his reign, as his rule extended into northern Babylonia and he suppressed the incursions of nomads around Babylon and Borsippa, restoring fields and orchards to their former owners. His religious devotions included restoring Marduk's throne in the Esagila in Babylon. (Note: The Eclectic Chronicle (ABC 24), BM 27859, r. 9–16.) An inscription of Esarhaddon of Assyria (681–669 BC), relates how part of the temple of Ištar in the Eanna at Uruk, the shrine of the goddess Nanaya originally built by Nazi-Maruttaš in the 13th century, had been restored by Erība-Marduk. Not all restorations, however, were to the liking of his successors. According to the Harran stele of Nabonidus (555–539 BC), his reign witnessed a sacrilegious reform of the cult of Ištar (bēltu ša Uruk, "lady of Uruk"), when the people of Uruk replaced her statue with an unsuitable one, unyoking its team of lions and removing its shrine. This may have been part of a program of suppressing the licentious cults of the goddesses in southern Babylonia.

The only extant royal inscriptions from his reign are two duck-weights (Note: 30 MA.NA GI.NA É.GAL eri-ba-^{d}AMAR.UTU LUGAL TIN.TIR^{KI}: "30 minas, correct (weight). Palace of Eriba-Marduk, King of Babylon," BM 91433 and (possibly?) BM 12118.) endorsed by Erība-Marduk's palace administration, and a part of a solid clay cylinder (Note: Cylinder MS 1846/4.) thought to be commemorating the inauguration of cultic idols, their decoration and transport upstream on the river Euphrates to Uruk.
