= Bert van der Spek =

Robartus Johannes (Bert) van der Spek (born 18 September 1949 in Zoetermeer) is a Dutch ancient historian, specializing in the Seleucid Empire. He was a full professor in Ancient Studies at VU University Amsterdam from 1993 to his retirement in 2014, and is currently working on the Babylonian Chronicles of the Hellenistic Age (a collection of cuneiform tablets in the British Museum). He is also the author of the best-selling first-year book for ancient history: An introduction to the Ancient World.

Van der Spek studied History beginning in 1967 at Leiden University.

== Publications ==
- L. de Blois & R. J. van der Spek, An Introduction to the Ancient World (1997 Routledge; London, New York)
- I. Finkel & R. J. van der Spek, Babylonian Chronicles of the Hellenistic World (forthcoming)
