= Chaldea =

Small Semitic nation of ancient Mesopotamia

The Chaldean tribes in Babylonia during the 1st millennium BC.

Chaldea (/kælˈdiːə/) refers to a region probably located in the marshy land of southern Mesopotamia. It is mentioned, with varying meaning, in Neo-Assyrian cuneiform, the Hebrew Bible, and in classical Greek texts. The Hebrew Bible uses the term כשדים (Kaśdim), and this is translated as Chaldaeans in the Christian Greek Old Testament.

During a period of weakness in the East Semitic-speaking kingdom of Babylonia, new tribes of West Semitic-speaking migrants arrived in the region from the Levant between the 11th and 9th centuries BC. The earliest waves consisted of Suteans and Arameans, followed a century or so later by the Kaldu, a group who became known later as the Chaldeans or the Chaldees. These migrations did not affect the powerful kingdom and empire of Assyria in Upper Mesopotamia, which repelled these incursions.

These nomadic Chaldeans settled in the far southeastern portion of Babylonia, chiefly on the left bank of the Euphrates. Though for a short time the name commonly referred to the whole of southern Mesopotamia in Hebraic literature, this was a geographical and historical misnomer as Chaldea proper was in fact only the plain in the far southeast formed by the deposits of the Euphrates and the Tigris, extending about 640 kilometres (400 mi) along the course of these rivers and averaging about 160 km (100 mi) in width. There were several kings of Chaldean origins who ruled Babylonia. From 626 BC to 539 BC, a ruling dynasty in later times referred to as the "Chaldean dynasty", named after their possible Chaldean origin, ruled the kingdom at its height under the Neo-Babylonian Empire, although the final ruler of this empire, Nabonidus (556–539 BC) (and his son and regent Belshazzar) was a usurper of Assyrian ancestry.

Despite the similarity in name, Chaldea is not to be confused with the modern Chaldean Catholic Church or its adherents, who are predominantly ethnic Assyrians. Members of the Assyrian community have noted that Mandaeans hold a stronger demographic connection to the ancient inhabitants of the region.

== Name ==
The name Chaldaea is a latinization of the Greek Khaldaía (Χαλδαία), a hellenization of Akkadian māt Kaldu or Kašdu, suggesting an underlying /kaɬdu/. The term Chaldea appears in Hebrew in the Bible as Kaśdim (כַּשְׂדִּים), while Chaldeans are Hebrew Kaśdim (כַּשְׂדִּים) and Aramaic Kaśdā'in (כַּשְׂדָּאִין).

Genesis 22:22 lists Kesed (כֶּשֶׂד, reconstructed /kaɬd/), perhaps a singular form of Kasdim, as son of Abraham's brother Nahor (and brother of Kemuel the father of Aram), residing in Aram Naharaim. Jubilees 11:7 claims that "Ur son of Kesed built the city of Ur-Kasdim, and he named it after himself and his father".

Jewish historian Flavius Josephus (37–c. 100) links Arpachshad and Chaldaea in his Antiquities of the Jews: "Arphaxad named the Arphaxadites, who are now called Chaldeans." Umberto Cassuto suggests that the name "Arpachshad" (ארפכשד) may be compounded from Arapcha-Kesed.

== Land ==
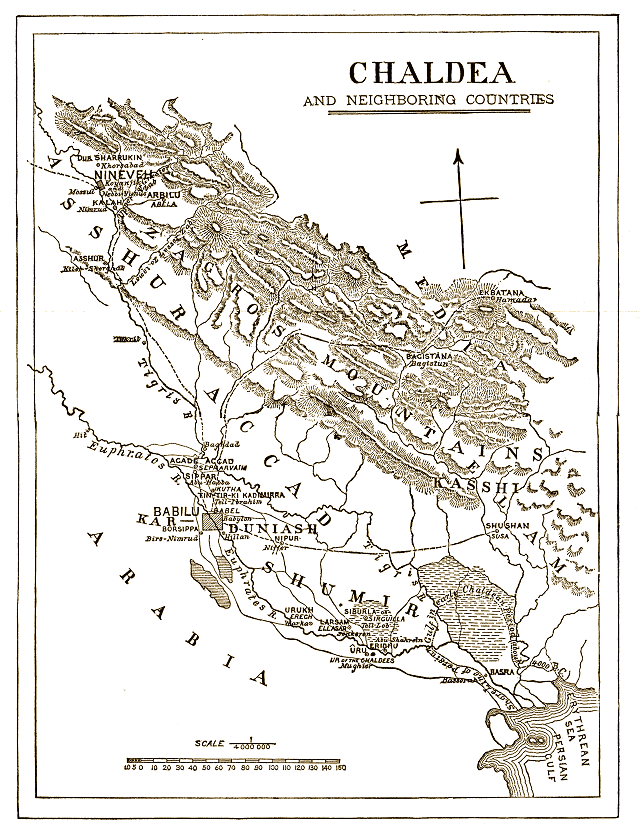
Chaldea and neighboring countries

In the early period, between the early 9th century and late 7th century BC, mat Kaldi was the name of a small sporadically independent migrant-founded territory under the domination of the Neo-Assyrian Empire (911–605 BC) in southeastern Babylonia, extending to the western shores of the Persian Gulf.

The expression mat Bit Yâkin is also used, apparently synonymously. Bit Yâkin was the name of the largest and most powerful of the five tribes of the Chaldeans, or equivalently, their territory. The original extension of Bit Yâkin is not known precisely, but it extended from the lower Tigris into the Arabian Peninsula. Sargon II mentions it as extending as far as Dilmun or "sea-land" (littoral Eastern Arabia). "Chaldea" or mat Kaldi generally referred to the low, marshy, alluvial land around the estuaries of the Tigris and Euphrates, which at the time discharged their waters through separate mouths into the sea.

The tribal capital Dur Yâkin was the original seat of Marduk-Baladan.

The king of Chaldea was also called the king of Bit Yakin, just as the kings of Babylonia and Assyria were regularly styled simply king of Babylon or Assur, the capital city in each case. In the same way, what is now known as the Persian Gulf was sometimes called "the Sea of Bit Yakin", and sometimes "the Sea of the Land of Chaldea".

"Chaldea" came to be used in a wider sense, of Southern Mesopotamia in general, following the brief ascendancy of the Chaldeans during 608–557 BC. This is especially the case in the Hebrew Bible, which was substantially composed during this period (roughly corresponding to the period of Babylonian captivity). The Book of Jeremiah makes frequent reference to the Chaldeans (King James Version Chaldees following LXX Χαλδαίοι; in Biblical Hebrew as Kasdîm כַּשְׂדִּים). Book of Habakkuk 1:6 calls them "that bitter and hasty nation" (הַגֹּוי הַמַּר וְהַנִּמְהָר). Book of Isaiah 23:13 DRB states, “Behold the land of the Chaldeans, there was not such a people, the Assyrians founded it: they have led away the strong ones thereof into captivity, they have destroyed the houses thereof, they have brought it to ruin.”

== Ancient Chaldeans ==
Unlike the East Semitic Akkadian-speaking Akkadians, Assyrians and Babylonians, whose ancestors had been established in Mesopotamia since at least the 30th century BC, the Chaldeans were not a native Mesopotamian people, but were late 10th- or early 9th-century BC West Semitic Levantine migrants to the southeastern corner of the region, who had played no part in the previous three millennia of Sumero-Akkadian and Assyro-Babylonian Mesopotamian civilization and history.

The ancient Chaldeans seem to have migrated into Mesopotamia sometime between c. 940 and 860 BC, a century or so after other new Semitic arrivals, the Arameans and the Suteans, appeared in Babylonia, c. 1100 BC. According to Ran Zadok, they first appear in written record in cylinder inscriptions of the King of Mari Aššur-ketta-lēšir II (late 12th-early 11th century BC), which record them reaching Mesopotamia as early as the 11th century BC. They later appear in the annals of the Assyrian king Shalmaneser III during the 850s BC. This was a period of weakness in Babylonia, and its ineffectual native kings were unable to prevent new waves of semi-nomadic foreign peoples from invading and settling in the land.

Though belonging to the same West Semitic speaking ethnic group and migrating from the same Levantine regions as the earlier arriving Aramaeans, they are to be differentiated; the Assyrian king Sennacherib, for example, carefully distinguishes them in his inscriptions.

The Chaldeans were for a time able to keep their identity despite the dominant native Assyro-Babylonian (Sumero-Akkadian-derived) culture although, as was the case for the earlier Amorites, Kassites and Suteans before them, by the time Babylon fell in 539 BC, perhaps before, the Chaldeans ceased to exist as a specific ethnic group.

In the Hebrew Bible, "Ur of the Chaldees" (Ur Kaśdim) is cited as the starting point of the patriarch Abraham's journey to Canaan.

=== Language ===
Ancient Chaldeans probably spoke a West Semitic language similar to Old Aramaic.

During the Neo-Assyrian Empire, Imperial Aramaic became the lingua franca of the empire under the rule of the Assyrian king Tiglath-Pileser III in the mid-8th century BC. As a result, in late periods both the Babylonian and Assyrian dialects of Akkadian became marginalized, and Aramaic took its place across Mesopotamia, including among the Chaldeans, and later, also the southern Levant. One form of this once widespread Aramaic language was used in some books of the Hebrew Bible (the Book of Daniel and the Book of Ezra). The use of the name "Chaldean" (Chaldaic, Chaldee) to describe it, first introduced by Jerome of Stridon (d. 420), became common in early Aramaic studies, but that misnomer was later corrected, when modern scholars concluded that the Aramaic dialect used in the Hebrew Bible was not closely related to the ancient Chaldean language.

== History ==
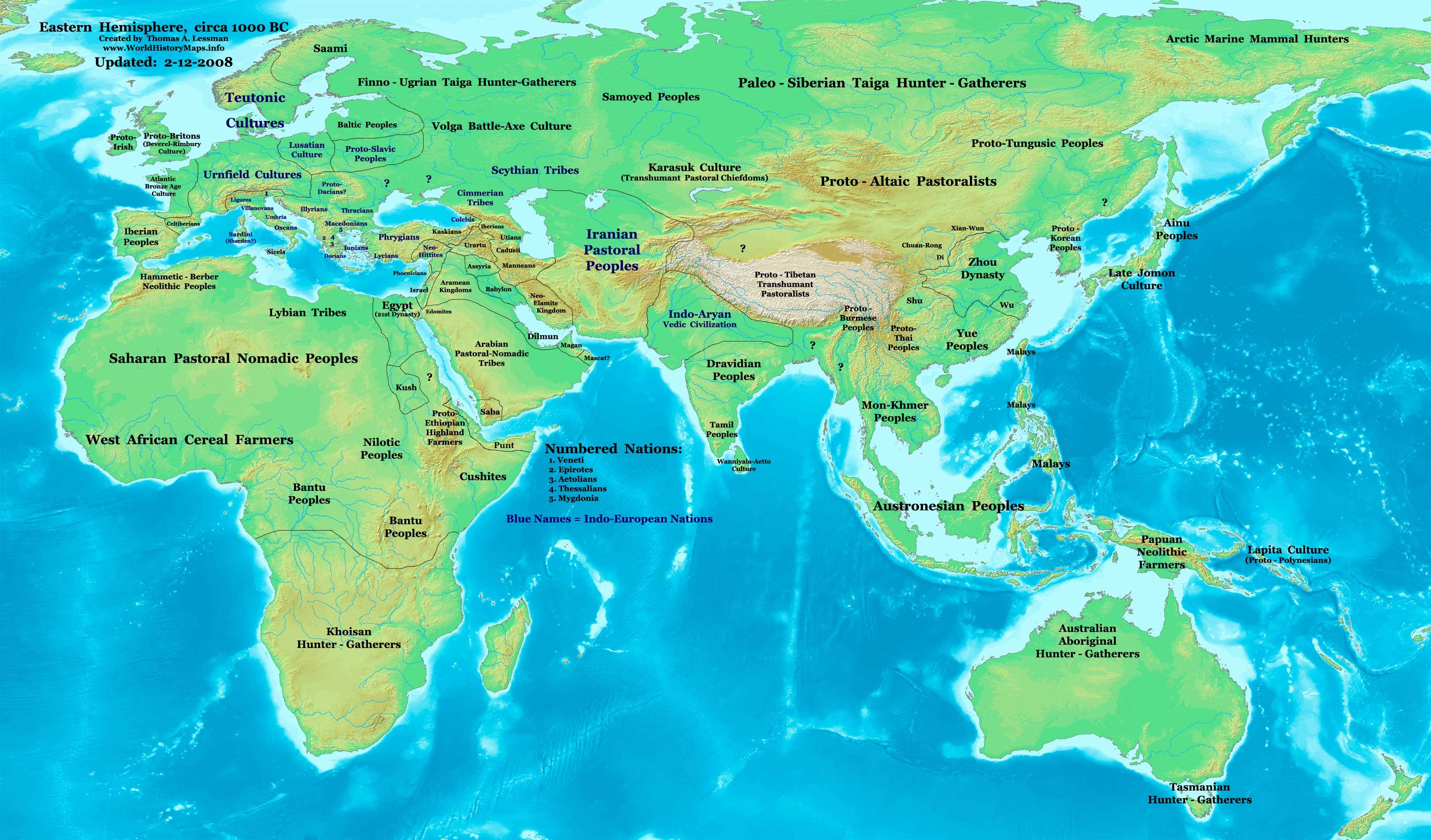
Eurasia around 1000 BC, showing Babylon, Assyria, Aramean states and their neighbors

The region that the Chaldeans eventually made their homeland was in relatively poor southeastern Mesopotamia, at the head of the Persian Gulf. They appear to have migrated into southern Babylonia from the Levant at some unknown point between the end of the reign of Ninurta-kudurri-usur II (a contemporary of Tiglath-Pileser II) circa 940 BC, and the start of the reign of Marduk-zakir-shumi I in 855 BC, although there is no historical proof of their existence prior to the late 850s BC.

For perhaps a century or so after settling in the area, these semi-nomadic migrant Chaldean tribes had no impact on the pages of history, seemingly remaining subjugated by the native Akkadian speaking kings of Babylon or by perhaps regionally influential Aramean tribes. The main players in southern Mesopotamia during this period were Babylonia and Assyria, together with Elam to the east and the Aramaeans, who had already settled in the region a century or so prior to the arrival of the Chaldeans.

The very first written historical attestation of the existence of Chaldeans occurs in 852 BC, in the annals of the Assyrian king Shalmaneser III, who mentions invading the southeastern extremes of Babylonia and subjugating one Mushallim-Marduk, the chief of the Amukani tribe and overall leader of the Kaldu tribes, together with capturing the town of Baqani, extracting tribute from Adini, chief of the Bet-Dakkuri, another Chaldean tribe.

Shalmaneser III had invaded Babylonia at the request of its own king, Marduk-zakir-shumi I, who, being threatened by his own rebellious relations, together with powerful Aramean tribes pleaded with the more powerful Assyrian king for help. The subjugation of the Chaldean tribes by the Assyrian king appears to have been an aside, as they were not at that time a powerful force or a threat to the native Babylonian king.

Important Kaldu tribes and their regions in southeastern Babylonia were Bit-Yâkin (the original area the Chaldeans settled in on the Persian Gulf), Bet-Dakuri, Bet-Adini, Bet-Amukkani, and Bet-Shilani.

Chaldean leaders had by this time already adopted Assyro-Babylonian names, religion, language, and customs, indicating that they had become Akkadianized to a great degree.

The Chaldeans remained quietly ruled by the native Babylonians (who were in turn subjugated by their Assyrian relations) for the next seventy-two years, only coming to historical prominence for the first time in Babylonia in 780 BC, when a previously unknown Chaldean named Marduk-apla-usur usurped the throne from the native Babylonian king Marduk-bel-zeri (790–780 BC). The latter was a vassal of the Assyrian king Shalmaneser IV (783–773 BC), who was otherwise occupied quelling a civil war in Assyria at the time.

This was to set a precedent for all future Chaldean aspirations on Babylon during the Neo-Assyrian Empire; always too weak to confront a strong Assyria alone and directly, the Chaldeans awaited periods when Assyrian kings were distracted elsewhere in their vast empire, or engaged in internal conflicts, then, in alliance with other powers stronger than themselves (usually Elam), they made a bid for control over Babylonia.

Shalmaneser IV attacked and defeated Marduk-apla-user, retaking northern Babylonia and forcing on him a border treaty in Assyria's favour. The Assyrians allowed him to remain on the throne, although subject to Assyria. Eriba-Marduk, another Chaldean, succeeded him in 769 BC and his son, Nabu-shuma-ishkun in 761 BC, with both being dominated by the new Assyrian king Ashur-Dan III (772–755 BC). Babylonia appears to have been in a state of chaos during this time, with the north occupied by Assyria, its throne occupied by foreign Chaldeans, and continual civil unrest throughout the land.

The Chaldean rule proved short-lived. A native Babylonian king named Nabonassar (748–734 BC) defeated and overthrew the Chaldean usurpers in 748 BC, restored indigenous rule, and successfully stabilised Babylonia. The Chaldeans once more faded into obscurity for the next three decades. During this time both the Babylonians and the Chaldean and Aramean migrant groups who had settled in the land once more fell completely under the yoke of the powerful Assyrian king Tiglath-Pileser III (745–727 BC), a ruler who introduced Imperial Aramaic as the lingua franca of the empire. The Assyrian king at first made Nabonassar and his successor native Babylonian kings Nabu-nadin-zeri, Nabu-suma-ukin II and Nabu-mukin-zeri his subjects, but decided to rule Babylonia directly from 729 BC. He was followed by Shalmaneser V (727–722 BC), who also ruled Babylon in person.

When Sargon II (722–705 BC) ascended the throne of the Assyrian Empire in 722 BC after the death of Shalmaneser V, he was forced to launch a major campaign in his subject states of Persia, Mannea and Media in Ancient Iran to defend his territories there. He defeated and drove out the Scythians and Cimmerians who had attacked Assyria's Persian and Median vassal colonies in the region. At the same time, Egypt began encouraging and supporting the rebellion against Assyria in Israel and Canaan, forcing the Assyrians to send troops to deal with the Egyptians.

These events allowed the Chaldeans to once more attempt to assert themselves. While the Assyrian king was otherwise occupied defending his Iranian colonies from the Scythians and Cimmerians and driving the Egyptians from Canaan, Marduk-apla-iddina II (the Biblical Merodach-Baladan) of Bit-Yâkin, allied himself with the powerful Elamite kingdom and the native Babylonians, briefly seizing control of Babylon between 721 and 710 BC. With the Scythians and Cimmerians vanquished, the Medes and Persians pledging loyalty, and the Egyptians defeated and ejected from southern Canaan, Sargon II was free at last to deal with the Chaldeans, Babylonians, and Elamites. He attacked and deposed Marduk-apla-adding II in 710 BC, also defeating his Elamite allies in the process. After defeat by the Assyrians, Merodach-Baladan fled to his protectors in Elam

Political maps of the Ancient Near East in 700 BC (top) and 600 BC (bottom)

In 703, Merodach-Baladan very briefly regained the throne from a native Akkadian-Babylonian ruler Marduk-zakir-shumi II, who was a puppet of the new Assyrian king, Sennacherib (705–681 BC). He was once more soundly defeated at Kish, and once again fled to Elam where he died in exile after one final failed attempt to raise a revolt against Assyria in 700 BC, this time not in Babylon, but in the Chaldean tribal land of Bit-Yâkin. A native Babylonian king named Bel-ibni (703–701 BC) was placed on the throne as a puppet of Assyria.

The next challenge to Assyrian domination came from the Elamites in 694 BC, with Nergal-ushezib deposing and murdering Ashur-nadin-shumi (700–694 BC), the Assyrian prince who was king of Babylon and son of Sennacherib. The Chaldeans and Babylonians again allied with their more powerful Elamite neighbors in this endeavour. This prompted the enraged Assyrian king Sennacherib to invade and subjugate Elam and Chaldea and to sack Babylon, laying waste to and largely destroying the city. Babylon was regarded as a sacred city by all Mesopotamians, including the Assyrians, and this act eventually resulted in Sennacherib's being murdered by his own sons while he was praying to the god Nisroch in Nineveh.

Esarhaddon (681–669 BC) succeeded Sennacherib as ruler of the Assyrian Empire. He completely rebuilt Babylon and brought peace to the region. He conquered Egypt, Nubia and Libya and entrenched his mastery over the Persians, Medes, Parthians, Scythians, Cimmerians, Arameans, Israelites, Phoenicians, Canaanites, Urartians, Pontic Greeks, Cilicians, Phrygians, Lydians, Manneans and Arabs. For the next 60 or so years, Babylon and Chaldea remained peacefully under direct Assyrian control. The Chaldeans remained subjugated and quiet during this period, and the next major revolt in Babylon against the Assyrian empire was fermented not by a Chaldean, Babylonian or Elamite, but by Shamash-shum-ukin, who was an Assyrian king of Babylon, and elder brother of Ashurbanipal (668–627 BC), the new ruler of the Neo-Assyrian Empire.

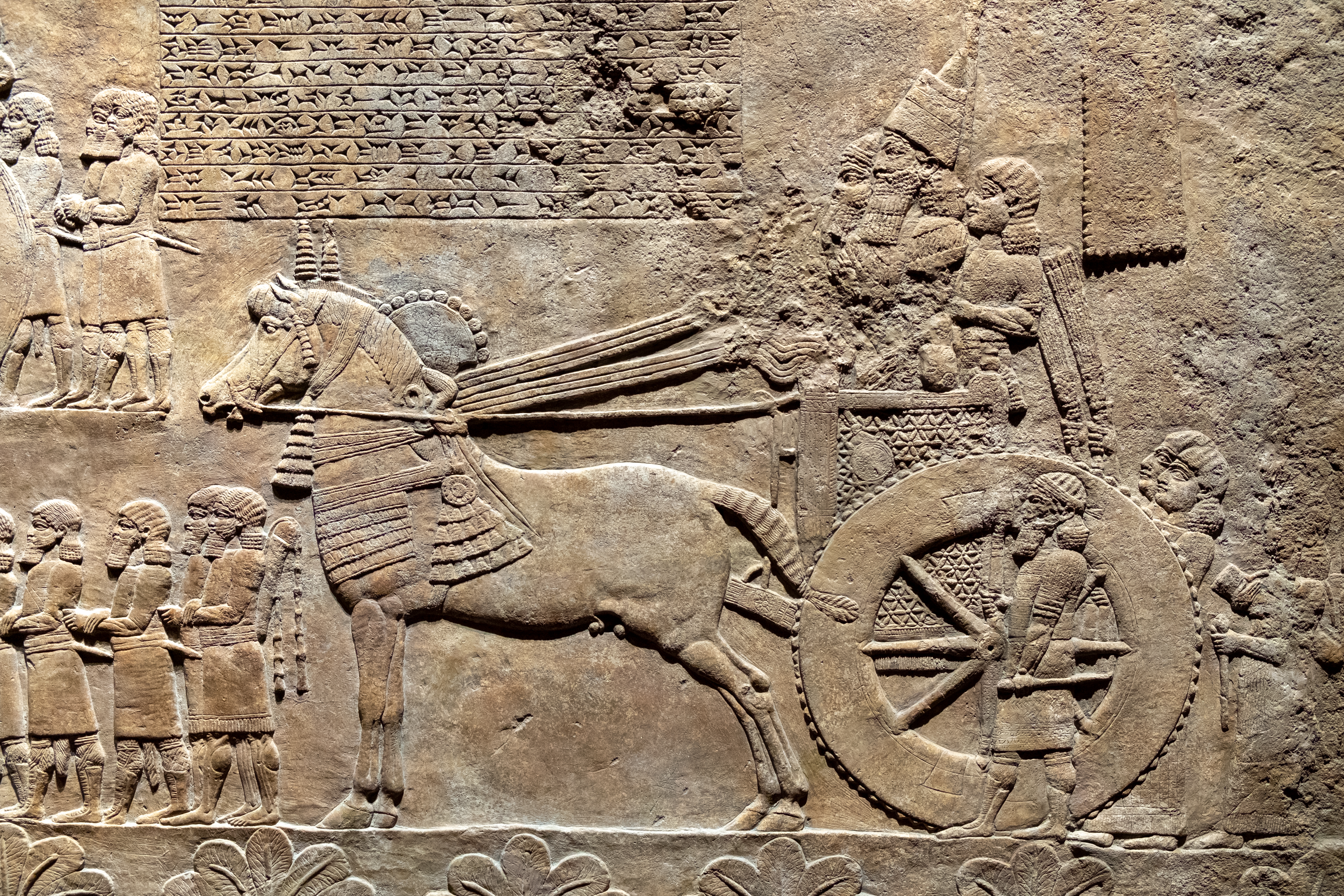
Relief depicting Assurbanipal in a chariot, inspecting booty and prisoners from Babylon.

Shamash-shum-ukin (668–648 BC) had become infused with Babylonian nationalism after sixteen years peacefully subject to his brother, and despite being Assyrian himself, declared that the city of Babylon and not Nineveh or Assur should be the seat of the empire.

In 652 BC, he raised a powerful coalition of peoples resentful of their subjugation to Assyria against his own brother Ashurbanipal. The alliance included the Babylonians, Persians, Chaldeans, Medes, Elamites, Sultans, Arameans, Israelites, Arabs and Canaanites, together with some disaffected elements among the Assyrians themselves. After a bitter struggle lasting five years, the Assyrian king triumphed over his rebellious brother in 648 BC, Elam was utterly destroyed, and the Babylonians, Persians, Medes, Chaldeans, Arabs, and others were savagely punished. An Assyrian governor named Kandalanu was then placed on the throne of Babylon to rule on behalf of Ashurbanipal. The next 22 years were peaceful, and neither the Babylonians nor Chaldeans posed a threat to the dominance of Ashurbanipal.

However, after the death of the mighty Ashurbanipal (and Kandalanu) in 627 BC, the Neo-Assyrian Empire descended into a series of bitter internal dynastic civil wars that were to be the cause of its downfall.

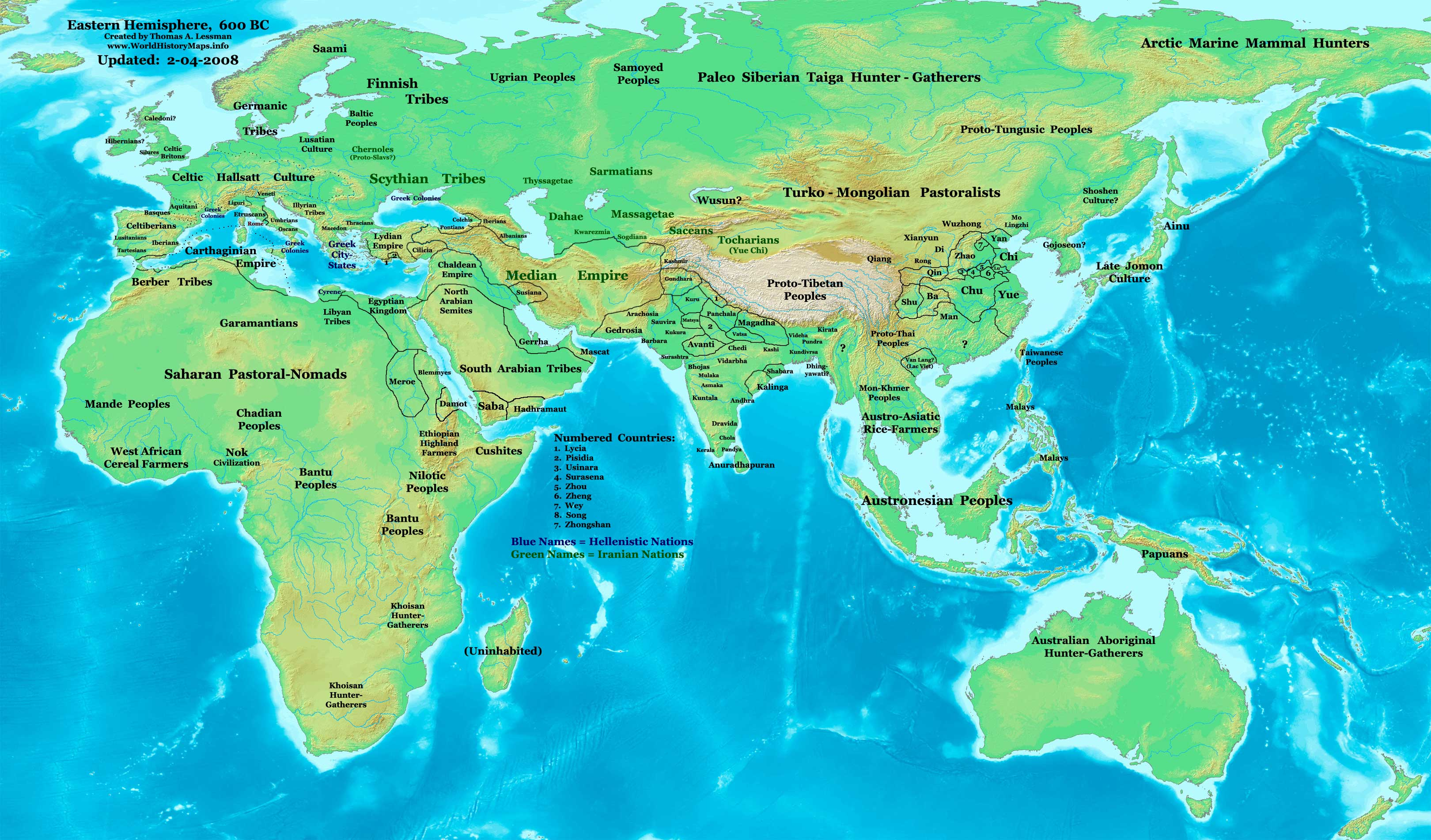
Eurasia around 600 BC, showing Neo-Babylonian Empire (Chaldean Empire) and its neighbors

Ashur-etil-ilani (626–623 BC) ascended to the throne of the empire in 626 BC but was immediately engulfed in a torrent of fierce rebellions instigated by rival claimants. He was deposed in 623 BC by an Assyrian general (turtanu) named Sin-shumu-lishir (623–622 BC), who was also declared king of Babylon. Sin-shar-ishkun (622–612 BC), the brother of Ashur-etil-ilani, took back the throne of empire from Sin-shumu-lishir in 622 BC, but was then himself faced with unremitting rebellion against his rule by his own people. Continual conflict among the Assyrians led to a myriad of subject peoples, from Cyprus to Persia and The Caucasus to Egypt, quietly reasserting their independence and ceasing to pay tribute to Assyria.

Nabopolassar, a previously obscure and unknown Chaldean chieftain, followed the opportunistic tactics laid down by previous Chaldean leaders to take advantage of the chaos and anarchy gripping Assyria and Babylonia and seized the city of Babylon in 620 BC with the help of its native Babylonian inhabitants.

Sin-shar-ishkun amassed a powerful army and marched into Babylon to regain control of the region. Nabopolassar was saved from likely destruction because yet another massive Assyrian rebellion broke out in Assyria proper, including the capital Nineveh, which forced the Assyrian king to turn back in order to quell the revolt. Nabopolassar took advantage of this situation, seizing the ancient city of Nippur in 619 BC, a mainstay of pro-Assyrianism in Babylonia, and thus Babylonia as a whole.

However, his position was still far from secure, and bitter fighting continued in the Babylonian heartlands from 620 to 615 BC, with Assyrian forces encamped in Babylonia in an attempt to eject Nabopolassar. Nabopolassar attempted a counterattack, marched his army into Assyria proper in 616 BC, and tried to besiege Assur and Arrapḫa (modern Kirkuk), but was defeated by Sin-shar-ishkun and chased back into Babylonia after being driven from Idiqlat (modern Tikrit) at the southernmost end of Assyria. A stalemate seemed to have ensued, with Nabopolassar unable to make any inroads into Assyria despite its greatly weakened state, and Sin-shar-ishkun unable to eject Nabopolassar from Babylonia due to constant rebellions and civil war among his own people.

Nabopolassar's position, and the fate of the Assyrian empire, was sealed when he entered into an alliance with another of Assyria's former vassals, the Medes, the now dominant people of what was to become Persia. The Median Cyaxares had also recently taken advantage of the anarchy in the Assyrian Empire, while officially still a vassal of Assyria, he took the opportunity to meld the Iranian peoples; the Medes, Persians, Sagartians and Parthians, into a large and powerful Median-dominated force. The Medes, Persians, Parthians, Chaldeans and Babylonians formed an alliance that also included the Scythians and Cimmerians to the north.

While Sin-shar-ishkun was fighting both the rebels in Assyria and the Chaldeans and Babylonians in southern Mesopotamia, Cyaxares (hitherto a vassal of Assyria), in alliance with the Scythians and Cimmerians launched a surprise attack on civil-war-beleaguered Assyria in 615 BC, sacking Kalhu (the Biblical Calah/Nimrud) and taking Arrapḫa (modern Kirkuk). Nabopolassar, still pinned down in southern Mesopotamia, was not involved in this major breakthrough against Assyria. From this point however, the alliance of Medes, Persians, Chaldeans, Babylonians, Sagartians, Scythians and Cimmerians fought in unison against Assyria.

Despite the sorely depleted state of Assyria, bitter fighting ensued. Throughout 614 BC the alliance of powers continued to make inroads into Assyria itself, although in 613 BC the Assyrians somehow rallied to score a number of counterattacking victories over the Medes-Persians, Babylonians-Chaldeans and Scythians-Cimmerians. This led to a coalition of forces ranged against it to unite and launch a massive combined attack in 612 BC, finally besieging and sacking Nineveh in late 612 BC, killing Sin-shar-ishkun in the process.

A new Assyrian king, Ashur-uballit II (612–605 BC), took the crown amidst the house-to-house fighting in Nineveh, and refused a request to bow in vassalage to the rulers of the alliance. He managed to fight his way out of Nineveh and reach the northern Assyrian city of Harran, where he founded a new capital. Assyria resisted for another seven years until 605 BC, when the remnants of the Assyrian army and the army of the Egyptians, whose 26th Dynasty had formed a brief allied coalition with the Assyrians, were defeated at Karchemish. Nabopolassar and his Median, Scythian and Cimmerian allies were now in possession of much of the huge Neo-Assyrian Empire. The Egyptians had belatedly come to the aid of Assyria, which they would have hoped to support as a secure buffer between Egypt and the new powers of Babylon, Medes and Persians, having already been raided by the Scythians.

The Chaldean king of Babylon now ruled all of southern Mesopotamia (Assyria in the north was ruled by the Medes), and the former Assyrian possessions of Aram (Syria), Phoenicia, Israel, Cyprus, Edom, Philistia, and parts of Arabia, while the Medes took control of the former Assyrian colonies in Ancient Iran, Asia Minor and the Caucasus.

Nabopolassar was not able to enjoy his success for long, dying in 604 BC, only one year after the victory at Karchemish. He was succeeded by his son, who took the name Nebuchadnezzar II, after the unrelated 12th century BC native Akkadian-Babylonian king Nebuchadnezzar I, indicating the extent to which the migrant Chaldeans had become infused with native Mesopotamian culture.

Nebuchadnezzar II and his allies may well have been forced to deal with remnants of Assyrian resistance based in and around Dur-Katlimmu, as Assyrian imperial records continue to be dated in this region between 604 and 599 BC. In addition, the Egyptians remained in the region an attempt to revive the Asian colonies of the ancient Egyptian Empire.

Nebuchadnezzar II was to prove himself to be the greatest of the Chaldean rulers, rivaling another non-native ruler, the 18th century BC Amorite king Hammurabi, as the greatest king of Babylon. He was a patron of the cities and a spectacular builder, rebuilding all of Babylonia's major cities on a lavish scale. His building activity at Babylon, expanding on the earlier major and impressive rebuilding of the Assyrian king Esarhaddon, helped to turn it into the immense city of legend. Babylon covered more than 8 km^{2} (3 sq mi), surrounded by moats and ringed by a double circuit of walls. The Euphrates flowed through the center of the city, spanned by a stone bridge. At the center of the city rose the giant ziggurat called Etemenanki, "House of the Frontier Between Heaven and Earth," which lay next to the Temple of Marduk. He is also believed by many historians to have built The Hanging Gardens of Babylon (although others believe these gardens were built much earlier by an Assyrian king in Nineveh) for his wife, a Median princess from the green mountains, so that she would feel at home.

A capable leader, Nebuchadnezzar II conducted successful military campaigns; cities like Tyre, Sidon and Damascus were subjugated. He also conducted numerous campaigns in Asia Minor against the Scythians, Cimmerians, and Lydians. Like their Assyrian relations, the Babylonians had to campaign yearly in order to control their colonies.

In 601 BC, Nebuchadnezzar II was involved in a major but inconclusive battle against the Egyptians. In 599 BC, he invaded Arabia and routed the Arabs at Qedar. In 597 BC, he invaded Judah, captured Jerusalem after the siege of Jerusalem (597 BC) and deposed its king Jehoiachin, carrying the Israelites into captivity in Babylon. Egyptian and Babylonian armies fought each other for control of the Near East throughout much of Nebuchadnezzar's reign, and this encouraged king Zedekiah of Judah to revolt. After an eighteen-month siege, Jerusalem was captured in 587 BC, thousands of Jews were deported to Babylon, and Solomon's Temple was razed to the ground.

Nebuchadnezzar successfully fought the Pharaohs Psammetichus II and Apries throughout his reign, and during the reign of Pharaoh Amasis in 568 BC it is rumoured that he may have briefly invaded Egypt itself.

By 572, Nebuchadnezzar was in full control of Babylonia, Chaldea, Aramea (Syria), Phonecia, Israel, Judah, Philistia, Samarra, Jordan, northern Arabia, and parts of Asia Minor. Nebuchadnezzar died of illness in 562 BC after a one-year co-reign with his son, Amel-Marduk, who was deposed in 560 BC after a reign of only two years.

=== End of the Chaldean dynasty ===
Neriglissar succeeded Amel-Marduk. It is unclear as to whether he was in fact an ethnic Chaldean or a native Babylonian nobleman, as he was not related by blood to Nabopolassar's descendants, having married into the ruling family. He conducted successful military campaigns against the Hellenic inhabitants of Cilicia, which had threatened Babylonian interests. Neriglissar reigned for only four years and was succeeded by the youthful Labashi-Marduk in 556 BC. Again, it is unclear whether he was a Chaldean or a native Babylonian.

Labashi-Marduk reigned only for a matter of months, being deposed by Nabonidus in late 556 BC. Nabonidus was certainly not a Chaldean, but an Assyrian from Harran, the last capital of Assyria, and proved to be the final native Mesopotamian king of Babylon. He and his son, the regent Belshazzar, were deposed by the Persians under Cyrus the Great in 539 BC.

When the Babylonian Empire was absorbed into the Persian Achaemenid Empire, the name "Chaldean" lost its meaning in reference to a particular ethnicity or land, but lingered for a while as a term solely and explicitly used to describe a societal class of astrologers and astronomers in southern Mesopotamia. The original Chaldean tribe had long ago became Akkadianized, adopting Akkadian culture, religion, language and customs, blending into the majority native population, and eventually wholly disappearing as a distinct race of people, as had been the case with other preceding migrant peoples, such as the Amorites, Kassites, Suteans and Arameans of Babylonia.

The Persians considered this Chaldean societal class to be masters of reading and writing, and especially versed in all forms of incantation, sorcery, witchcraft, and the magical arts. They spoke of astrologists and astronomers as Chaldeans, and it is used with this specific meaning in the Book of Daniel (Dan. i. 4, ii. 2 et seq.) and by classical writers, such as Strabo.

The disappearance of the Chaldeans as an ethnicity and Chaldea as a land is evidenced by the fact that the Persian rulers of the Achaemenid Empire (539–330 BC) did not retain a province called "Chaldea", nor did they refer to "Chaldeans" as a race of people in their written annals. This is in contrast to Assyria, and for a time Babylonia also, where the Persians retained the names Assyria and Babylonia as designations for distinct geo-political entities within the Achaemenid Empire. In the case of the Assyrians in particular, Achaemenid records show Assyrians holding important positions within the empire, particularly with regards to military and civil administration.

== Legacy ==
The term Chaldean was still in use at the time of Cicero (106–43 BC) long after the Chaldeans had disappeared. In one of his speeches he mentioned "Chaldean astrologers", and he spoke of them more than once in his De Divinatione. Other classical Latin writers who speak of them as distinguished for their knowledge of astronomy and astrology are Pliny the Elder, Valerius Maximus, Aulus Gellius, Cato the Elder, Lucretius, and Juvenal. Horace in his Carpe diem ode speaks of the "Babylonian calculations" (Babylonii numeri), the horoscopes of astrologers consulted regarding the future.

In the late antiquity, a variant of Aramaic that was used in some books of the Bible was misnamed as Chaldean by Jerome of Stridon. That inaccurate usage continued down the centuries in Western Europe, and it was still customary during the nineteenth century, until the misnomer was corrected by scholars. In West Asian, Greek and Hebraic sources, however, the term for the language spoken in Mesopotamia was commonly "Assyrian" and later also "Syriac". Accordingly, in the earliest recorded "Western" mentions of the Christians of what is now Iraq and nearby countries, "Chaldean" is used with reference to their language. In 1220/1, Jacques de Vitry wrote that "they denied that Mary was the Mother of God and claimed that Christ existed in two persons. They consecrated leavened bread and used the 'Chaldean' (Syriac) language". In the fifteenth century the term "Chaldeans" was first applied specifically to Assyrians living in Cyprus who entered a union with Rome, and no longer merely with reference to their language but the name of a new church.

=== Impact on Assyrian identity ===
After an absence from history for many years, the name was revived during the formation of the Chaldean Catholic Church. The church was not founded and populated by the long extinct Chaldean tribes of southeastern Mesopotamia, but founded in northern Mesopotamia by a breakaway group of ethnic Assyrians who had been members of the Church of the East before entering communion with Rome.

The naming by Rome is believed to be due to a misinterpretation of the term Ur Kasdim, the supposed north Mesopotamian birthplace of Abraham in Hebraic tradition as Ur of the Chaldees, and a reluctance to use the earlier terms, such as Assyrians, East Assyrians, East Syrians and Nestorians, due to their connotations with the Church of the East and Syriac Orthodox Church. In modern times, Chaldea has been associated with attempts to declare Chaldeans as a separate ethnicity from Assyrians, through the belief that their descent is based in southern Babylonia. While some religious leaders of the Chaldean Catholic Church and activists in the West have advocated for a separate identity based on this notion, historians and international organizations generally treat Chaldeans as ethnic Assyrians, owing to genetic, linguistic, geographic, and modern historical factors.

However, across the rest of Mesopotamia (particularly the North) after Chaldea fell, the terms "Assyrian", and its derivative Syrian remained the common ethnic term for the Aramaic-speaking inhabitants. These were used by the people themselves and their Persian, Armenian, Arab, Greek, Georgian and Kurdish neighbours both before and after the advent of Christianity in Iraq, Northeast Syria, Southeast Turkey and Northwest Iran. The Assyrian continuity in these regions is well documented.

== Sources ==
- Baum, Wilhelm; Winkler, Dietmar W. (2003). The Church of the East: A Concise History. London-New York: Routledge-Curzon. ISBN 9781134430192.
- Brinkman, John A. (1977). "Notes on Arameans and Chaldeans in Southern Babylonia in the Early Seventh Century B.C." Orientalia. 46 (2): 304–325. JSTOR 43074768.
- Dever, William G. (2002), What Did the Biblical Writers Know, and when Did They Know It?: What Archaeology Can Tell Us about the Reality of Ancient Israel, Wm. B. Eerdmans Publishing, ISBN 978-0-8028-2126-3
- Gallagher, Edmon L. (2012). Hebrew Scripture in Patristic Biblical Theory: Canon, Language, Text. Leiden-Boston: Brill. ISBN 9789004228023.
- McCurdy, J. Frederic; Rogers, Robert W. (1902), "Chaldea", in Singer, Isidore; et al. (eds.), The Jewish Encyclopedia, vol. 3, New York: Funk & Wagnalls, pp. 661–662
- Lenorman, Francois (1877), Chaldean Magic: Its Origin and Development, London: Samuel Bagster & Sons
- Moore, Megan Bishop; Kelle, Brad E. (2011), Biblical History and Israel's Past, Eerdmans, ISBN 978-0-8028-6260-0
- Nöldeke, Theodor (1871). "Die Namen der aramäischen Nation und Sprache". Zeitschrift der Deutschen Morgenländischen Gesellschaft. 25 (1–2): 113–131. JSTOR 43366019.
- Prince, John Dyneley (1911), "Chaldaea" , in Chisholm, Hugh (ed.), Encyclopædia Britannica, vol. 5 (11th ed.), Cambridge University Press, p. 804
- Roux, Georges (27 August 1992). Ancient Iraq. Penguin Books Limited. ISBN 978-0-14-193825-7.
- Sayce, Archibald Henry (1878), "Babylon—Babylonia" , Encyclopædia Britannica, vol. 5 (9th ed.), p. 182–194
- Sayce, Archibald Henry (1878), "Chaldea" , in Baynes, T. S. (ed.), Encyclopædia Britannica, vol. 5 (9th ed.), New York: Charles Scribner's Sons, p. 372
- Vanderhooft, David S. (2017). "Depictions of כשדים 'Chaldeans' in Judean Prophecy and Historiography". Now It Happened in Those Days: Studies in Biblical, Assyrian, and Other Ancient Near Eastern Historiography. Winona Lake: Eisenbrauns. pp. 171–182.
- Zadok, Ran (2017). "A Cylinder Inscription of Aššur-ketta-lēšir II". In Baruchi-Unna, Amitai; Forti, Tova; Aḥituv, Shmuel; Ephʿal, Israel; Tigay, Jeffrey H. (eds.). Now It Happened in Those Days: Studies in Biblical, Assyrian, and Other Ancient Near Eastern Historiography. Winona Lake: Eisenbrauns. pp. 309–340. ISBN 978-1575067612.
- Ragozin, Zénaïde A. (1886). Chaldea from the earliest times to the rise of Assyria. London: Unwin.
- Saggs, Henry W. F. (1996). "Chaldeans in the Nimrud Letters". Wiener Zeitschrift für die Kunde des Morgenlandes. 86: 379–390. JSTOR 23864750.
