= Marduk-apla-iddina I =

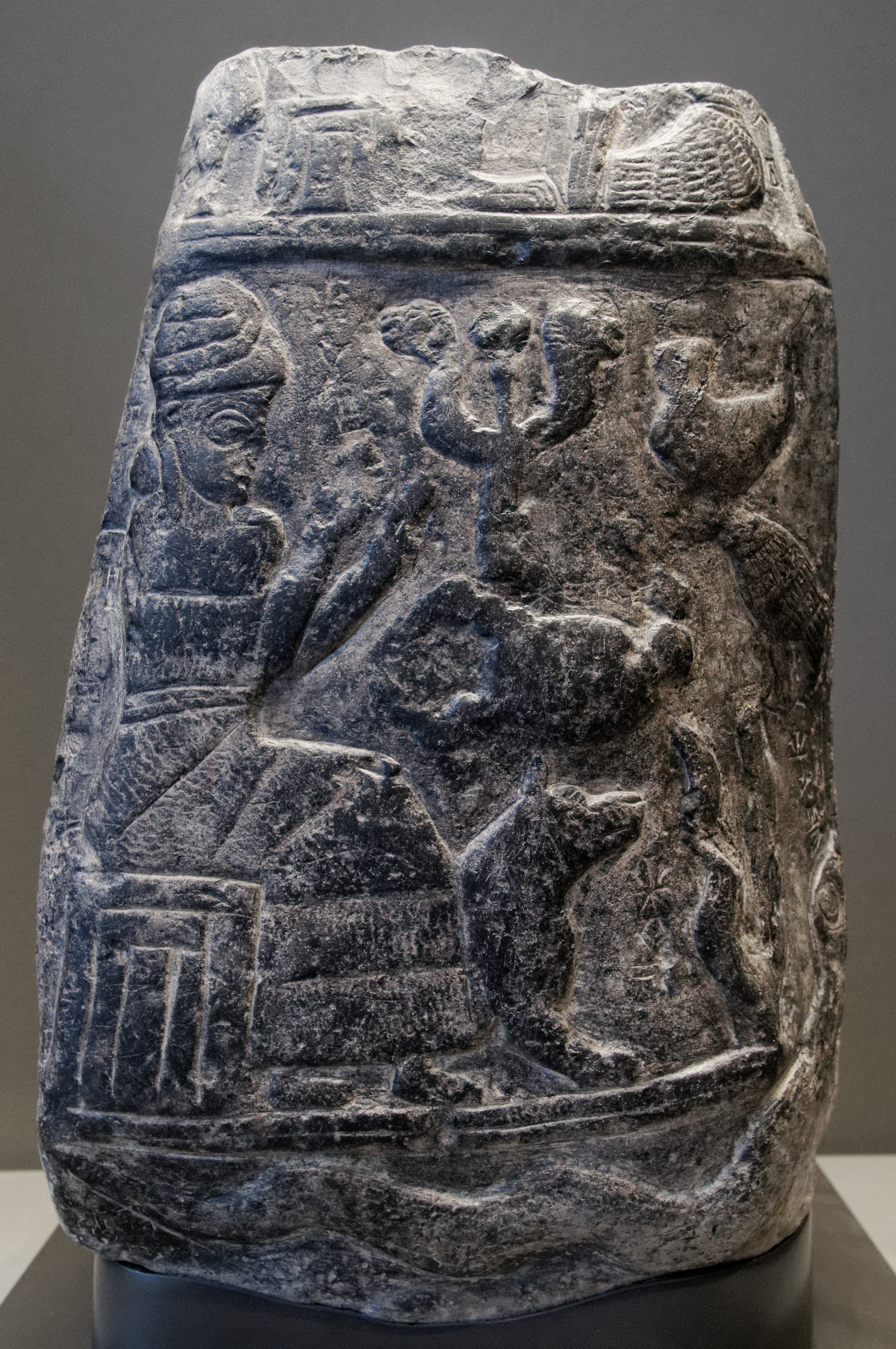
- Kudurru (Note: Kudurru of Gula, Sb 31, published as MDP X 95.) of Marduk-apla-iddina I

King of Babylon
- Reign: 13 regnal years c. 1171–1159 BC
- Predecessor: Meli-Šipak II
- Successor: Zababa-šuma-iddina
- Died: c. 1159
- House: Kassite
- Father: Meli-Shipak II

Marduk-apla-iddina I, contemporarily written in cuneiform as 𒀭𒀫𒌓𒌉𒍑𒋧𒈾 ᵈAMAR.UTU-IBILA-SUM-na and meaning in Akkadian: "Marduk has given an heir", was the 34th Kassite king of Babylon c. 1171–1159 BC . He was the son and successor of Meli-Shipak II, from whom he had previously received lands, as recorded on a kudurru, (Note: Land grant to Marduk-apla-iddina kudurru Sb 22, excavated at Susa and currently in the Louvre.) and he reigned for 13 years. (Note: Kinglist A, BM 33332, ii 13.) His reign is contemporary with the Late Bronze Age collapse. He is sometime referred to as Merodach-Baladan I.

== Biography ==
He claimed, like his father, descent from Kurigalzu and evidently kept court in Dūr-Kurigalzu itself because tablets found in the burnt ruins of the Tell-el-Abyad quarter which marked the later Elamite destruction of the city, are dated in the first two years of his reign. These include lists of garments received or distributed for the New Year, or akitu, festival and indicate a normal economic relationship with Babylonia's western and eastern neighbors, the Subarians and Elamites respectively, whose singers apparently entertained the royal household. Documents surviving from his reign date only as late as his sixth year (Note: Namely, tablet IM 50025.) and include his repair of the E-zida temple at Borsippa, (Note: VS 1, 34, VAT 4131.) where he credited the god Enlil with raising him to kingship despite recording this in an inscription wholly dedicated to Marduk.

There is evidence of thriving commerce in woolen garments with Assyrian traders, (Note: IM 49992.) and numerous royal land grants in northern and especially northeastern Babylonia. The Chronicle of the Market Prices (Note: Chronicle of Market Prices (ABC 23), BM 48498, lines 10 and 11.) references his 21st year, but neither king with this name ruled longer than 13 years. Like his two predecessors, some of the economic texts show a curious double-dating formula which has yet to be satisfactorily explained. The Synchronistic King List (Note: Synchronistic King List ii 9.) gives his Assyrian contemporary as Ninurta-apal-Ekur, which is unlikely as he is also shown against the earlier two Kassite kings, despite his short reign.

=== Kudurrus ===
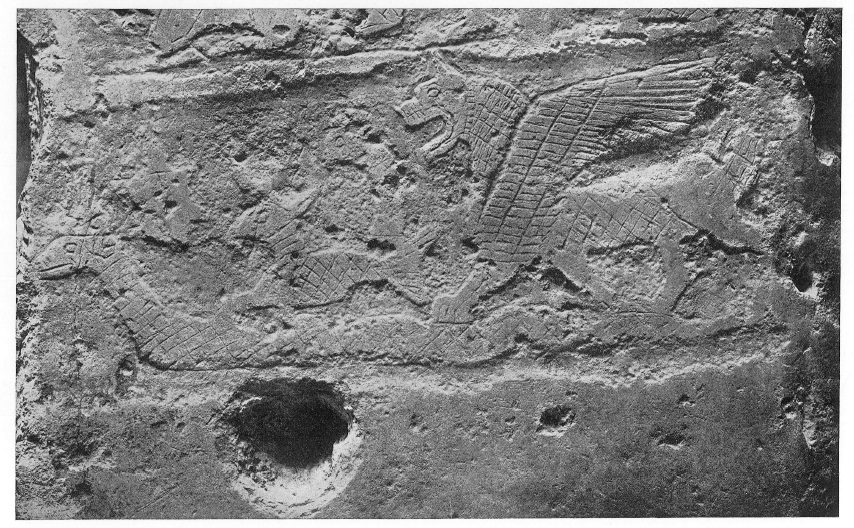
Detail from a kudurru of Marduk-apla-iddina I. (Note: Land grant to Marduk-zākir-šumi kudurru, BM 90850, published as BBSt 5.)

Several inscribed kudurrus, or boundary stones, survive which document large donations of land and tax exemptions during his reign. Marduk-zākir-šumi, the bēl pīḫati, or provincial governor, was the beneficiary of a piece of land as a perquisite from the king. He was son of Nabû-nadin-aḫe, grandson of Rimeni-Marduk, great-grandson of Uballissu-Marduk, who had been šatammu, or an official under Kurigalzu II’s regime and descendant of Arad-Ea, um-mi-a-niğ_{2}-kas_{7}, scholar of accounting. His responsibilities included inspector of temple and land and controller of forced labor. One of the witnesses was Nabû-šakin-šumi, also described as “son of” Arad-Ea. Another stele records that Ina-Esağila-zēra-ibni, “son of” Arad-Ea, measured a field, after replacing the previous land surveyor.

The symbol of the stylus, representing the god of writing and wisdom, Nabû, makes its first appearance on one of his kudurrus. A kudurru comes with an unusual trinity of gods in its invocation of a divine curse, (Note: ^{d}AG ^{d}Na-na-a ù ^{d}Taš-me-tum bēlē šipṭi u purussê ana lemutti lisḫurūš ana la ṭābti [liš]te'uš.) “May Nabû, Nanaya and Tašmētum, lords of the decrees and decisions, surround him with evil and search him out for misfortune.”

The continuity of the reign with those earlier in the dynasty is evident in a kudurru providing confirmation of an earlier land grant by Adad-šuma-uṣur (Note: Adad-bēl-kala kudurru AS 6035 (Sb 169) published as MDP VI 42.) and a copy of a kudurru (Note: Kudurru of Nazi-Maruttaš, Sb 21, published as MDP II 86.) from the reign of Nazi-Maruttaš, the original of which was destroyed when a wall collapsed on it. Kudurrus were also used to record legal settlements, and two examples include a lawsuit (Note: Land grant to Munnabittu kudurru, Sb 26, published as MDP VI 31.) concerning land in Ḫudadu (Baghdad?) province, on the Elamite border east of the Tigris from his accession year, and one (Note: Kudurru of Marduk-apla-iddina, Sb 33 (AS 6018), published as MDP 6 39.) recording legal actions over a field.

=== List of kudurrus dated to this reign ===
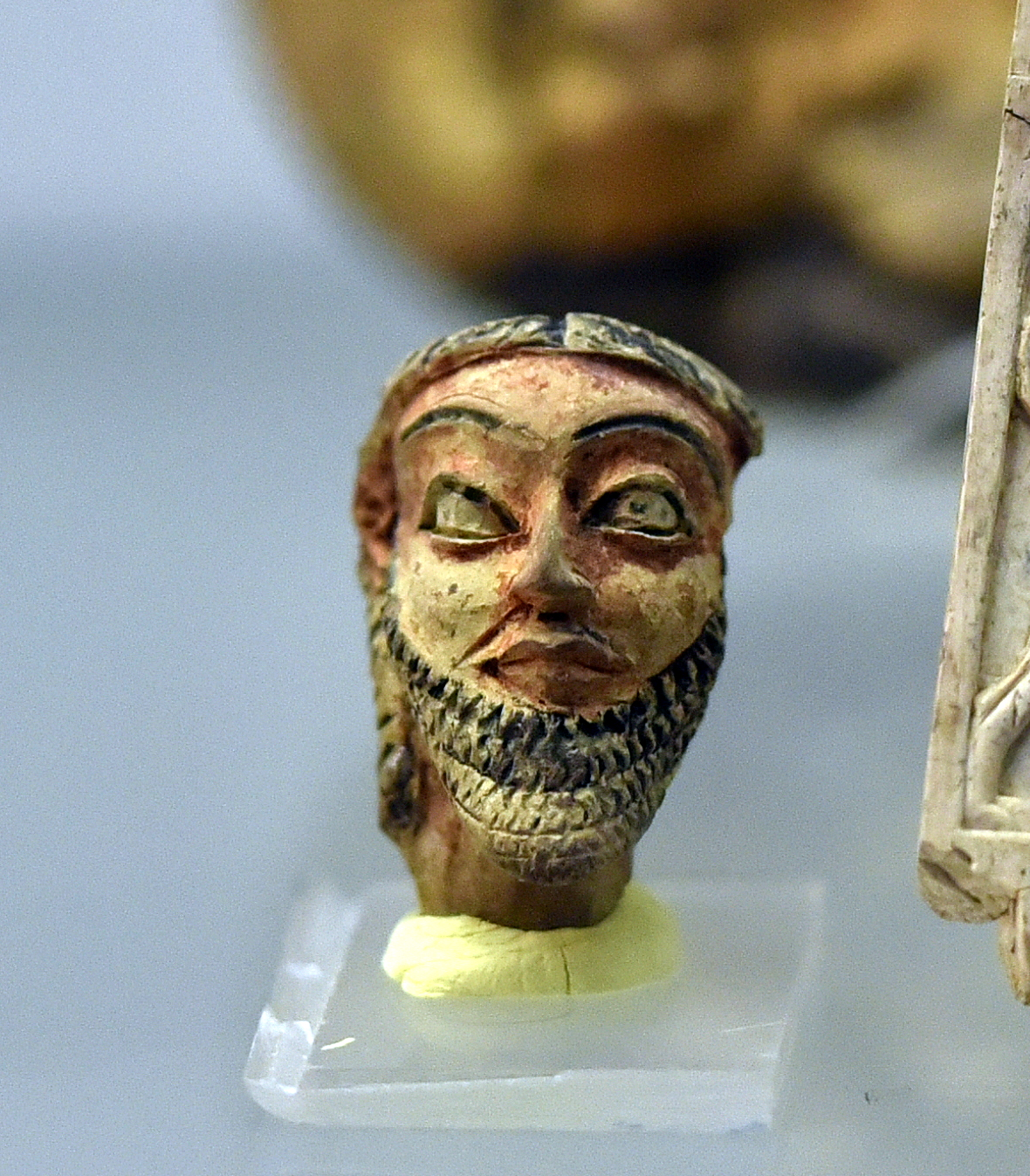
Male head from Dur-Kurigalzu, Iraq, reign of Marduk-apla-iddina I. Iraq Museum.

Around eighteen kudurrus could be assigned to his reign based upon the art-history of their iconography. The following lists those which actually identify him as the monarch in their texts.

- Land grant to Marduk-zākir-šumi kudurru, the bēl pīḫati
- Land grant to Munnabittu kudurru
- Uzbi-Enlil kudurru (Note: Uzbi-Enlil kudurru, IM 67953, published as Sumer 23 (1967) 45–67, pl. 1–6.)
- Broken kudurru of Marduk-apla-iddina
- Adad-bēl-kala kudurru confirming a gift by the earlier king Adad-šuma-uṣur
- Fragmentary kudurru of Marduk-apla-iddina (Note: Kudurru of Marduk-apla-iddina, NBC 9502, partially published as Hallo & Simpson (1988) 100, fig. 21.)
- The Tehran kudurru (Note: Tehran kudurru, published as Borger AfO 23 (1970) 1–11.)

Also dated to his reign is the stone copy of the Nazimaruttaš kudurru stone.

=== End of his reign ===
The events at the end of his reign are uncertain, but it is clear from later sources that it ended dramatically, when Elamite troops led by Shutruk-Nahhunte, who had married a sister of Marduk-apla-iddina, invaded Babylonia and sacked several cities, including the capital. Whether these events were the cause of his demise, or whether they followed a succession crisis in which Zababa-šuma-iddina, an individual whose relationship with Marduk-apla-iddina is unknown, attempted to succeed him to the kingship, has yet to be determined.

The Prophecy A (Note: Prophecy A, tablet VAT 10179, KAR 421.) text may portray him in the figure of the 4th king, whose 13-year reign ends with an Elamite attack on Akkad, the booty of Akkad taken away, confusion, social disorder, usurpation and famine, events which seem to mirror much of what is known about this period.
