= Chronicle of the Market Prices =

The Chronicle of Market Prices, designated "Chronicle 23" in Grayson’s Assyrian and Babylonian chronicles, its first publishing, and Mesopotamian Chronicle 50: “Chronicle of Market Prices” in Glassner’s Mesopotamian Chronicles is an ancient Mesopotamian Chronicle laconically recording the cost of various commodities from the beginning of the second until the early-mid first millennium BC. The moniker is a modern designation as it had no colophon to identify it in antiquity.

== The text ==
It is known from a single fragmentary Seleucid era copy, now held in the British Museum with reference BM 48498 (81-11-3, 1209) where only the left-hand side (6.5 x 3 cm) of a medium sized tablet remains. The surface is heavily worn, especially on the reverse, and the bottom is also broken off, consequently leaving a gap in the middle of the narrative. The text is subdivided into sections of uneven length apparently devoted to different reigns and ends halfway down the reverse.

Providing a brief résumé of commodity prices from sometime prior to the reign of Ḫammu-rapī (ana tar-ṣi Am-mu-ra-pí, c. 1728–1686 BC, short chronology) until a period possibly as late as Nabû-šuma-iškun (c. 748 BC), it seems to have been compiled as a prologue to the pricing quoted in the Babylonian astronomical diaries, which seem to have begun immediately after this period, as it shares their phraseology. Other kings whose names are discernible include Kurigalzu I or II, the twenty-first year of Marduk-apla-iddina I or II (neither king reigned that long, unless Marduk-apla-iddina II's eight-year interregnum is included), Nabû-kudurrī-uṣur I or II and one whose name begins Marduk-, of whom there is a surfeit of potential candidates following Nabû-kudurrī-uṣur I but none following Nabû-kudurrī-uṣur II. Historian A. K. Grayson favors identification with the earlier two of the homonymous monarchs.

The main products mentioned, barley (ŠE-im), dates (ZÙ.LUM.MA), sesame (ŠE.GIŠ.Ì) and wool (SÍG^{ḪI.A}) were in widespread use as commodities for exchange from the earliest of times. Their sequence follows that of the astronomic diaries, which also include mustard/cuscuta and cress/cardamom whose economic significance developed in the first millennium.

== See also ==
- Chronology of the ancient Near East
