= Leonard William King =

English archaeologist and Assyriologist (1869–1919)

Leonard William King, FSA (8 December 1869 – 20 August 1919) was an English archaeologist and Assyriologist educated at Rugby School and King's College, Cambridge. He collected stone inscriptions widely in the Near East, taught Assyrian and Babylonian archaeology at King's College for a number of years, and published a large number of works on these subjects. He is also known for his translations of ancient works such as the Code of Hammurabi. He became Assistant Keeper of Egyptian and Assyrian Antiquities at the British Museum.

King died at Brooke House Nursing Home, Clapton, London, on 20 August 1919, having suffered influenza followed by bronchitis. His funeral service was held at St Mary's Church, Bryanston Square, London, and the interment took place at Abney Park Cemetery, Stoke Newington on 25 August 1919.

== Works ==
- Leonard William King (1898). First Steps in Assyrian. Kegan Paul, Trench, Trübner & Co., Ltd.
- Letters and Inscriptions of Hammurabi, 3 vols. (1898–1900)
- Encyclopaedia Biblica (contributor) (1903)
- Babylonian Religion and Mythology (1903)
- L.W. King and Henry H.R. Hall, Egypt and Western Asia in the light of Recent Discoveries (1907). (also published as History of Egypt, Chaldea, Syria, Babylonia, and Assyria in the light of recent discovery)
- Chronicles Concerning Early Babylonian Kings (1907) - vol1 - vol2
- A History of Sumer and Akkad (1910)
- A History of Babylon, from the Foundation of the Monarchy to the Persian Conquest (1915)
- Legends of Babylon and Egypt in Relation to Hebrew Tradition (Schweich Lecture for 1916)
- The seven tablets of creation : or The Babylonian and Assyrian legends concerning the creation of the world and of mankind. (1902)
