= Dynastic Chronicle =

8th century BC Mesopotamian text

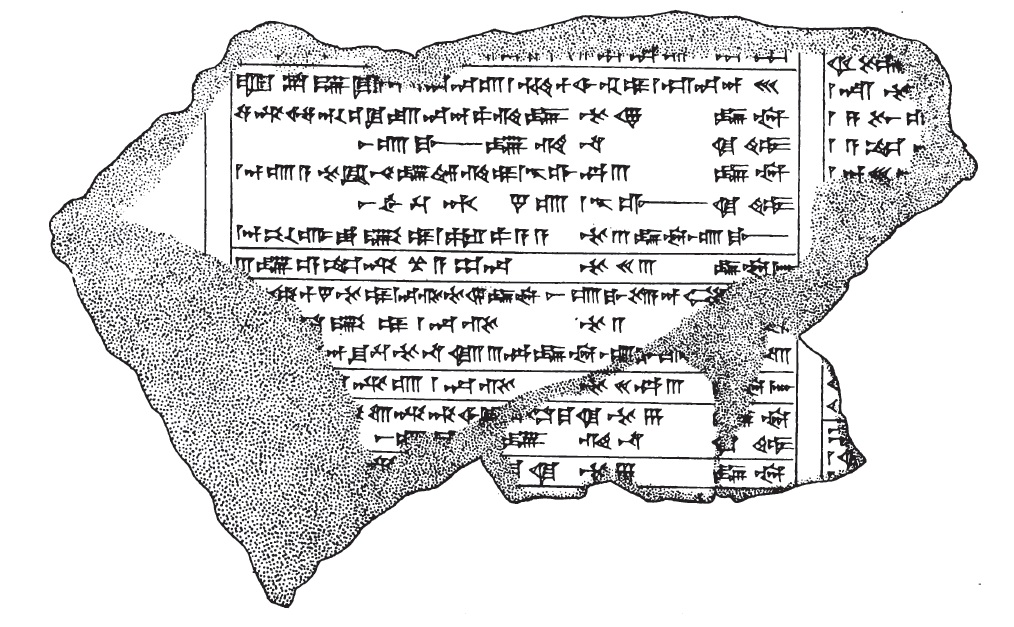
- L. W. King’s line-art for a fragment (K. 8532) of the Dynastic Chronicle
- Created: c. 740 BC
- Discovered: before 1908

The Dynastic Chronicle, "Chronicle 18" in Grayson's Assyrian and Babylonian Chronicles or the "Babylonian Royal Chronicle" in Glassner’s Mesopotamian Chronicles, is a fragmentary ancient Mesopotamian text extant in at least four known copies. It is actually a bilingual text written in 6 columns, representing a continuation of the Sumerian king list tradition through to the 8th century BC and is an important source for the reconstruction of the historical narrative for certain periods poorly preserved elsewhere.

== The text ==
From the extant pieces, the work apparently begins with a list of nine antediluvian kings from five cities, so much resembling that of the Sumerian King List that Thorkild Jacobsen considered it a variant, and an account of the flood before proceeding on with that of the successive Babylonian dynasties. Due to the poor state of preservation of the center of the text, there are a great many gaps (lacunae, or lacunas), and the narrative resumes with the post-Kassite king Simbar-Šipak (c. 1025–1008 BC), the final discernible king being Erība-Marduk (c. 769–761 BC) although it certainly would have continued, possibly until Nabû-šuma-iškun (c. 761–748 BC), leading William W. Hallo to suggest it to be a composition during Nabû-nāṣir's reign (747–732 BC).

The text dwells on the final resting place of the kings, leading some to propose that the legitimacy of rule determined the location of the burial.

=== Reconstruction ===
The following collation should be considered preliminary as small fragments continue to be identified, where 1A, 1B and 1C probably come from the same tablet although they do not actually join and others, such as 79-7-8, 333+ (copy 2 below) have their identification disputed.

Copy	Museum Reference	Find Spot
1A	K. 11261 + K. 11624 + K. 12054	Nineveh
1B	K. 8532 + K. 8533 + K. 8534 + K. 16801 + K. 16930 + ? K. 19528	Nineveh
1C	81-7-27, 117	Nineveh
2	79-7-8, 333 and 339 (unpublished duplicate)	Nineveh
3	BM 35572=Sp. III, 80	Babylon
4	BM 40565=80-11-12, 1088	Babylon

== See also ==
- Chronology of the ancient Near East
