= Marduk-apla-iddina II =

Marduk-apla-iddina II Merodach-Baladan
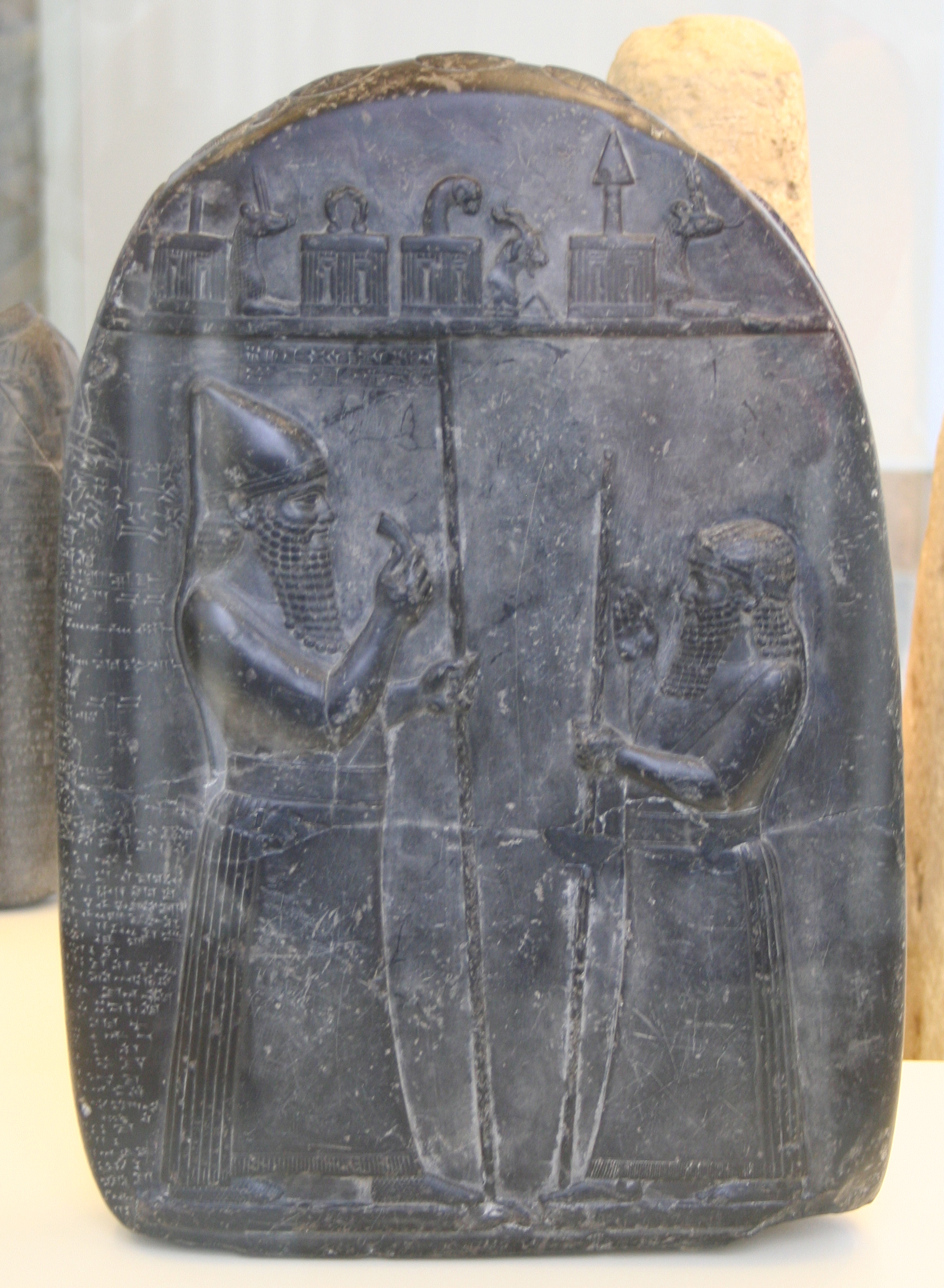
- Merodach-Baladan, King of Babylon, enfeoffs (makes a legal agreement with) a vassal. From the original in the Altes Museum, Berlin

King of Babylon
- 1st reign: 722–710 BC
- Predecessor: Shalmaneser V
- Successor: Sargon II
- 2nd reign: 703–702 BC
- Predecessor: Marduk-zakir-shumi II
- Successor: Bel-ibni
- Died: c. 697–694 BC

Marduk-apla-iddina II (Akkadian: ^{D}MES.A.SUM-na; in the Bible Merodach-Baladan or Berodach-Baladan, lit. Marduk has given me an heir) was a Chaldean ruler from the Bit-Yakin tribe, originally established in the territory that once made the Sealand in southern Babylonia. Marduk-apla-iddina II usurped the throne of Babylon and held it for many years before being overthrown.

== Biography ==
He seized the Babylonian throne in 722 BC from Assyrian control and reigned from 722 BC to 710 BC, and from 703 BC to 702 BC. His reign is defined by some historians as an illegitimate Third Dynasty of the Sealand, inside of the IXth Dynasty of Babylon, or Assyrian Dynasty.

He was known as one of the kings who maintained Babylonian independence in the face of Assyrian military supremacy for more than a decade.

Though Sargon of Assyria considered Marduk-apla-iddina's seizure of Babylonia to be unacceptable, an attempt to defeat him in battle near Der in 720 was unsuccessful. Afterwards, Sargon repressed the allies of Marduk-apla-iddina II in Elam, Aram and Israel and eventually drove him from Babylon (c. 710 BC). After the death of Sargon, Marduk-apla-iddina II briefly recaptured the throne from a native Babylonian nobleman. He reigned nine months (703–702 BC). He returned from Elam and ignited rebellion in Babylonia. He was able to enter Babylon and be declared king again. Nine months later he was defeated near Kish by Sennacherib and the Assyrians, but managed to flee to Elam. He died in exile a couple of years later.

A cylinder of Marduk-apla-iddina II from Uruk describes his rebuilding of the temple of Ningishzida built by the Ur III ruler Shulgi alongside the ziggurat of E-Anna. The cylinder also claims his victory at the Battle of Der in 720 BC, as did Assyrian king Sargon II and also Elamite king Humban-nikash I.

== In the Bible ==
He is mentioned as king of Babylon in the days of King Hezekiah, both in 2 Kings 20:12 (here called Berodach-baladan) and in Isaiah 39:1. In both passages he sends Hezekiah a letter, having heard of his illness and recovery. His messengers who have delivered the letter are lavishly entertained by Hezekiah, leading the prophet Isaiah to criticise Hezekiah for his excessive openness about the wealth he had amassed.

== See also ==
- Kings of Babylon
- List of biblical figures identified in extra-biblical sources

Preceded by Shalmaneser V Ululayu	King of Babylon; 722–710 BC	Succeeded by Sargon II
Preceded by Marduk-zakir-shumi II	King of Babylon; 703–702 BC	Succeeded by Bel-ibni

== Bibliography ==
- Erich Ebeling (ed.), Bruno Meissner (ed.), Ernst Weidner (ed.), Dietz Otto Edzard (ed.): Reallexikon der Assyriologie und vorderasiatischen Archäologie – Band 7 . Walter de Gruyter 1990, ISBN 3110104377, p. 375 (online copy, p. 375, at Google Books)
- Elayi, Josette (2017). Sargon II, King of Assyria. Atlanta: SBL Press. ISBN 978-1628371772.
- Frahm, Eckart (2017). "The Neo-Assyrian Period (ca. 1000–609 BCE)". In E. Frahm (ed.). A Companion to Assyria. Hoboken: John Wiley & Sons. ISBN 978-1-444-33593-4.
