= Chronicon =

In historiography, a chronicon is a type of chronicle or annals. Examples are:

- Chronicon (Eusebius)
- Chronicon (Jerome)
- Chronicon (Jacob of Edessa)
- Chronicon Abbatiae de Evesham
- Chronicon Burgense
- Chronicon Ambrosianum
- Chronicon Compostellanum
- Chronicon Gothanum
- Chronicon Helveticum
- Chronicon Holtzatiae
- Chronicon Iriense
- Chronicon Lethrense
- Chronicon Lusitanum
- Chronicon Paschale
- Chronicon Pictum
- Chronicon Roskildense
- Chronicon Salernitanum
- Chronicon Scotorum
- Chronicon complutense
- Chronicon terrae Prussiae
