= The State (book) =

1907 book by Franz Oppenheimer

- Author: Franz Oppenheimer
- Original title: Der Staat
- Subject: The state
- Genre: Political sociology
- Publisher: Unknown
- Publication date: 1907
- Publication place: German Empire
- English publication date: 1922
- Text: The State at Wikisource

The State (German: Der Staat) is a book by German sociologist Franz Oppenheimer first published in Germany in 1907. Oppenheimer wrote the book in Frankfurt am Main during 1907, as a fragment of the four-volume System of Sociology, an intended interpretative framework for the understanding of social evolution on which he laboured from the 1890s until the end of his life. The work summarizes Oppenheimer's general theory on the origin, development and future transformation of the state. The State, which Oppenheimer's missionary zeal pervades, was widely read and passionately discussed in the early 20th century. It was well received by—and influential on—as diverse an audience as Zionist settlers in Palestine (halutzim), American and Slavic communitarians, West German Chancellor Ludwig Erhard, and anarcho-capitalists like Murray Rothbard.

A classical liberal and socialist sympathiser, Oppenheimer regarded capitalism as "a system of exploitation and capital revenues as the gain of that exploitation", but placed the blame not on the genuinely free market, but on the intervention of the state. Oppenheimer's view of the state is profoundly opposed to the then dominant characterisation propounded by G. W. F. Hegel of the state as an admirable achievement of modern civilisation. Proponents of this view tend to accept the social contract view that the State came about as ever larger groups of people agreed to subordinate their private interests for the common good.

In contrast, Oppenheimer's view was an advancement of the "conquest theory" of the state that developed during the late 19th century by Ludwig Gumplowicz. According to conquest theory, the state came into being through war and conquest, a consequence of which was the establishment of social classes; the dominant conquerors and the subordinate conquered. This, in turn, led to the emergence of a political system to consolidate the power of the conquerors, to perpetuate and regulate class divisions. Oppenheimer's views led the American essayist, Albert Jay Nock, writing in the first half of the 20th century, to remark that in his own book, Our Enemy, the State:

Taking the State wherever found, striking into its history at any point, one sees no way to differentiate the activities of its founders, administrators and beneficiaries from those of a professional-criminal class.

== Summary ==
In his preface, Oppenheimer discusses the development of sociology in Western and Eastern Europe. The ideas of Capitalism and Socialism originated in England and were first expressed in that country, but it was only during the French Revolution that the contrast between the ruling class and the subject class was fully appreciated. The new sociology found a readier acceptance in Western Europe than in Eastern Europe because the contrast between the State and Society had not been realized in the East. In Germany, there was no economic or social movement of the third estate, and the two terms "State" and "Society" were used as synonyms. Theology played a leading role in Germany, resulting in the worship of the State, which reached its height in the Hegelian system. The sociology of Western Europe and the philosophy of history of Germany flowed side by side, with occasional intercommunicating streams. A direct junction between the two was achieved through Lorenz Stein, who became the leading German teacher of administrative law and influenced generations of thinkers.

=== Origins of the state ===
Chapter 1, "Theories of the State", presents a sociological perspective on the genesis, essence, and purpose of the State. Oppenheimer criticizes conventional theories of the State and argues that the ruling concept of the origin and essence of the State is untenable. The chapter argues against the theory that all human political organizations must gradually become a class-state due to inherent tendencies of development. A section titled The Sociological Idea of the State defines the State as "a social institution, forced by a victorious group of men on a defeated group, with the sole purpose of regulating the dominion of the victorious group over the vanquished, and securing itself against revolt from within and attacks from abroad. Teleologically, this dominion had no other purpose than the economic exploitation of the vanquished by the victors." He proposes a new concept, "Freemen's Citizenship," to describe advanced commonwealths. The chapter suggests that a complete examination of the states of the past and present should be supplemented by a study of races and states that are not covered in "Universal History."

Chapter 2, "The Genesis of the State", begins by arguing that the principal force of sociological development is the "economic" impulse, described as "the necessities of life, which force man to acquire for himself and for his family nourishment, clothing and housing". Section (a), titled "Political and Economic Means", proposes "two fundamentally opposed means whereby man, requiring sustenance, is impelled to obtain the necessary means for satisfying his desires": "work and robbery, one's own labor and the forcible appropriation of the labor of others". To avoid the stigma of these terms, he calls the former the "economic means" and the latter the "political means" for the satisfaction of needs.

According to Oppenheimer, "the state is an organization of the political means" – a later sentence says, of all "true 'States' in the sociologic sense", that "they are nothing but the organization of the political means, their form is domination, their content the economic exploitation of the subject by the master group." Albert Jay Nock would go on to repeat this phrasing in Our Enemy, The State, chapter 5.

Section (b), titled "Peoples Without a State: Huntsmen and Grubbers", explains that primitive huntsmen and peasants lack a state because they do not possess a developed economic organization to be subjugated. In the case of huntsmen, their society is an undifferentiated mass where only those individuals with magical powers are prominent. On the other hand, peasants live in liberty, scattered over the country in separated curtilages, perhaps in villages, split up due to quarrels about district or farm boundaries. In such a society, it is hardly conceivable that a warlike organization could come about for purposes of attack. They are totally lacking in that warlike desire to take the offensive, which is the distinguishing mark of hunters and herdsmen. War cannot better their condition. As a result, there is no possibility of a state arising from "the economic and social conditions of the peasant districts."

Section (c), titled "Peoples Preceding the State: Herdsmen and Vikings", argues that herdsmen have developed many elements of statehood, including economic and social differentiation, but they lack a defined territorial limit. The introduction of slavery into the tribal economy of herdsmen completed the essential elements of the state, and a social separation into three distinct classes – nobility, common freemen, and slaves – exists. The text also explains how herdsmen gradually become accustomed to earning their livelihood through warfare and exploiting men as servile labor motors, leading to the development of professional fighters.

Section (d), titled "The Genesis of the State", suggests that states arose from "the contrast between peasants and herdsmen, between laborers and robbers, between bottom lands and prairies." The chapter describes the six stages of the subjection of a peasant folk by a tribe of herdsmen or sea nomads. The author argues that the fundamental basis of civilization is the same all over the world, its development being consistent and regular under the most varied economic and geographical conditions. The first stage is the subjection of the peasant folk by the tribe, which leads to the payment of tribute by the peasant to the conqueror.

The second stage involves a herdsman developing a sense of economy and only taking the surplus from the peasant. The herdsman now sees the peasant as a source of wealth and the beginning of exploitation – a jural relation is created where the peasant is granted a right to the bare necessities of life, and it is wrong to kill or strip them of everything. The herdsmen may also grant respectful requests and remedy grievances. The third stage involves a tribe of herdsmen protecting the peasants from outside danger and becoming their protectors and saviors. This creates strong bonds and forms a sense of unity from common suffering and need.

The fourth stage of state development involves the union on one strip of land of both ethnic groups, which creates the concept of state territory. This territorial union may occur due to foreign influences, population increase, or cattle plagues. At this stage, the herdsmen stay in the neighborhood of their peasants to protect them against other groups and to prevent the peasants from seeking other overlords. However, local juxtaposition does not yet imply a state community in its narrowest sense. If the herdsmen are dealing with utterly unwarlike subjects, they continue their nomad life. If the country is not adapted to herding cattle on a large scale or where a less unwarlike population might make attempts at insurrection, the crowd of lords becomes more or less permanently settled, taking either steep places or strategically important points for their camps, castles, or towns. From these centers, they control their "subjects", mainly for the purpose of gathering their tribute, paying no attention to them in other respects. Their autochthonous constitution, their local officials, are, in fact, not interfered with. The author provides examples from different parts of the world to illustrate his point, including Abyssinia and ancient Mexico. The fifth stage involves the creation of a unital organization, where the herdsmen establish a state community with a political organization, and the sixth stage involves the development of state power.

=== Primitive states ===
Chapter 3, "The Primitive Feudal State", begins with Section (a), titled "The Form of Dominion", which claims that the form of the state is "the dominion of a small warlike minority, interrelated and closely allied, over a definitely bounded territory and its cultivators", regulated by the law of custom. The duty of paying and working on the part of the peasants corresponds to the duty of protection on the part of the lords. The state concept involves economic exploitation, and the peasants surrender a portion of their product without any equivalent service in return. The state's purpose is found to be the political means for the satisfaction of needs, and its method is by exacting ground rent. The author argues that the state's form is always that of dominion, whereby exploitation is regarded as justice. However, the absolute right of the conqueror is narrowed within the confines of law for the sake of permitting the continuous acquisition of ground rents. At this point, the primitive state is completely developed in all its essentials.

Section (b), titled "The Integration", discusses the "subjective growth" of the state, particularly its "socio-psychological 'differentiation and integration'." "The net of psychical relations becomes ever tighter and closer enmeshed, as the economic amalgamation advances." Cultures, languages, and religions amalgamate into one. "The conquerors are held to be the sons of the old gods." The feeling of being different from the foreigner beyond the borders grows stronger among those within the "realm of peace." In the same measure, the feeling of belonging to another grows stronger, and "the spirit of fraternity and of equity, which formerly existed only within the horde and which never ceased to hold sway within the association of nobles, takes root everywhere, and more and more finds its place in the relations between the lords and their subjects." A strong feeling of solidarity develops, which can be called "a consciousness of belonging to the same state."

Section (c), titled "The Differentiation: Group Theories and Group Psychology", discusses the development of group psychology and group theories in society. Oppenheimer argues that the interests of different groups, such as the ruling and subject groups, lead to the development of class consciousness and group feelings. The ruling group seeks to maintain the status quo, leading to conservatism, while the subject group desires change, resulting in liberalism and revolution. Oppenheimer also notes that groups believe they are acting freely, but their actions are determined by external pressures. The ruling group justifies their domination through the group theory of legitimacy, arguing that they are superior and their dominion is justified by religion. Oppenheimer describes the ruling class psychology, including their "aristocrat's pride" and contempt for the lower laboring strata.

Finally, Section (d), titled "The Primitive Feudal State of Higher Grade", describes the expansion of the primitive state and the emergence of the primitive feudal state of higher grade. "The young state must grow", since "the same forces that brought it into being, urge its extension, require it to grasp more power." "The object of the contest remains always the same, the produce of the economic means of the working classes, such as loot, tribute, taxes and ground rent." The lower classes fight for their masters in times of war, as "their chief interest lies in the course of the particular fight, which is, in any case, paid for with their own hides." The final result of the conflict, "in nearly all instances, is the amalgamation of both primitive states into a greater" one. The ruling group in this new "primitive feudal state of higher grade" disintegrates "into a number of more or less powerful and privileged strata". Similarly, the subject group is divided "into various strata more or less despised and compelled to render service."

Chapter 4, "The Maritime State", discusses the maritime state and how it is determined by commercial capital. He explains that the sea nomads did not invent trade, merchandising, fairs, or markets but instead developed these institutions to suit their interests. The economic means in the maritime state is not an object of exploitation by the political means but is a cooperating agent in originating the state. Section (a), titled "Traffic in Prehistoric Times", explains that "the history of primitive peoples shows that the desire to trade and barter is a universal human characteristic". However, barter can take place only when meeting with foreigners is peaceful. After trade is developed, it is strongly influenced by the "political means," but its first beginnings are chiefly the result of pacific, not warlike, intercourse. The author also notes that pacific relations with neighbors on an equal economic scale are much stronger and freer from the incentive to use political means than among herdsmen; the development of peaceful forms of interaction between neighboring groups created a whole code of public law ceremonies to demonstrate pacific intent. The custom of hospitality is seen as the source of peaceful trade, as it allowed the exchange of guest-gifts, which preceded barter. Oppenheimer highlights the existence of an "international" division of labor, which existed "much earlier and to a greater extent than is generally believed", and led to the development of trade. Also, "the exchange of women is observed universally, and doubtless exerts an extraordinarily strong influence in the development of peaceable intercourse between neighboring tribes, and in the preparation for barter of merchandise."

Section (b), titled "Trade and the Primitive State" explains that the robber-warrior cannot "unduly interfere with such markets and fairs as he may find within his conquered domain", due to "superstitious fear that the godhead will avenge a breach of the peace", besides economic reasons. The conquerors cannot do without the markets because the booty they acquire consists of much property that is unavailable for immediate use and consumption. For example, herdsman's need for slaves is limited by the size of their herds, and they are likely to exchange their surplus for other valuable items such as salt, ornaments, arms, metals, woven materials, utensils, etc. Thus, herdsmen are not only robbers but also merchants and traders, and they protect trade. Similarly, sea nomads are coerced to preserve or create marketplaces for the transportation of loot, especially of herds and slaves, is difficult and dangerous on the trails across the desert or the steppes. Oppenheimer quotes "Faust": "war, commerce, and piracy are inseparable."

Section (c), titled "Genesis of the Maritime State", claims that the maritime state arose from "trade in the loot of piracy". Oppenheimer suggests that "harbor markets developed from probably two general types: they grew up either as piratical fortresses directly and intentionally placed in hostile territory, or else as 'merchant colonies' based on treaty rights in the harbors of foreign primitive or developed feudal states." He explains that "maritime states or cities, in the strict sense, came into being not only through warlike conquest, but also through peaceable beginnings, by a more or less mixed pénétration pacifique." The author cites several examples from ancient history, including Carthage and the Greek sea nomads, who settled in their sea castles on the Adriatic and Tyrrhenian coasts of Southern Italy, among others.

Finally, Section (d), titled "Essence and Issue of the Maritime States", notes that these states are also true "States" in the sociological sense, even if they originated from sea-robbers' fortresses or from merchant colonies that obtained dominion or amalgamated with the dominant group of the host people. The author states that the maritime states' form is domination, and their content is the economic exploitation of the subject by the master group, just like in the case of the territorial states. He also notes that these states' "inner or socio-psychological causes" of contrast with territorial states are the growth of a democratic constitution and the development of capitalistic slave-work, which eventually annihilated all these states. Maritime states were born from piracy and trade, and their purpose was to extend their power by securing the monopoly of robbery and trade and dominating essential places of production. Unlike territorial states, maritime states did not need to carry their development beyond the first five stages and attain complete intranationality and amalgamation. Domination in maritime states meant permanent administration, making the subjects work for the ruling class, and large landed properties were a source of money rentals, which were administered as absentee property.

=== Feudal states ===
Chapter 5, "The Development of the Feudal State", begins with Section (a), titled "The Genesis of Landed Property". It describes the differentiation of wealth in the primitive feudal state and how private ownership of lands created a sharper contrast of social rank. Initially, the common freemen would have been powerful enough to prevent the formation of extended landed estates, but no one could have foreseen the possibility that extended possession of land would eventually do them harm. The princes of the noble clans received more land and peasants than the common freemen due to their position as patriarchs, warlords, and captains maintaining their warlike suites of half-free persons, servants, clients, or refugees. About this fixed nucleus of wealth, property begins to agglomerate with increasing rapidity, and the external policy of the feudal state is no longer directed toward the acquisition of land and peasants, but rather of peasants without land, to be carried off home as serfs and colonized anew.

Section (b), titled "The Central Power in the Primitive Feudal State", argues that despotic power often emerges when a military leader manages to fuse together numerous tribes into one powerful mass of warriors. "The leaders of the great migrations of nomads are all powerful despots", as are the rulers of mighty territorial states. The development of a despotism depends on the rulers' "sacerdotal status", "in addition to their position as war-lords, and whether or not they hold the monopoly of trade as an additional regalian right." "The combination of Caesar and Pope tends in all cases to develop the extreme forms of despotism." The section also discusses how "the power of the head of the state is frequently increased enormously by the trading monopoly, a function exercised by the primitive chieftains as a natural consequence of the peaceful barter of guest-gifts."

Section (c), titled "The Political and Social Disintegration of the Primitive Feudal State", suggests that regardless of how much power the ruler had at the beginning, "an inevitable fate breaks down his power in a short while", especially if the power is extensive, as seen in the larger territories of the primitive feudal state of higher grade. The process of occupation and settlement of unused lands by nobles contributed to the disintegration of the central power. The more the state expanded, the more the official power had to be delegated to representatives on the borders and marches, who were constantly threatened by wars and insurrections. These officials were "endowed with supreme military powers", and in return, they received the income of the subjects. They would settle new lands with newly recruited serfs, thereby increasing their military strength. This ultimately resulted in the officials becoming almost independent of the central authority, leading to complaints such as "The sky is high up and the Tsar is far off."

Oppenheimer discusses the feudal states in India and Africa and their tendency to agglomerate and disintegrate. The process of agglomeration and disintegration is initiated when a state splits into smaller, territorially independent states, which then are absorbed by a larger state, until a new empire is formed. He explains the effect of this process on the lower strata of the dominating group. The common freemen sink into bondsmanship, and their decay goes along with that of the central power. He explores the reasons behind the primitive feudal state's liberation from the process of agglomeration and disintegration, and how this process changes the articulation of classes. Then, he explains that the last nail in the coffin of the common freemen is when the patriarch's right of disposition of unoccupied lands passes to the territorial magnate with the remaining royal privileges. The territorial magnate forbids settlement by free peasants and allows only those who recognize his superior lordship.

Section (d), titled "The Ethnic Amalgamation", discusses the ethnic amalgamation resulting from "the juristic and social amalgamation of the degraded freemen and the uplifted plebs." Oppenheimer explains that "the social class is no longer determined by descent from the ruling race, but rather by wealth." The amalgamation of "the former ethnic master group" and "the former subject group" "into a unital social class" is "a universal process found in all history." "The holder of the central power or some local potentate, taking the rank of a prince, requires more supple tools for his dominion than are to be found among his 'peers.'" Therefore, he places confidence in his own men rather than in those of his cousins or petty nobles. Oppenheimer provides examples from the courts of the western European feudal kingdoms, Egypt, Persia, Turkey, Morocco, etc. Finally, he mentions the Fulbe, who confide positions at court and the defense of the country to their slaves rather than their own kinsmen or free associates of their tribe.

Section (e), titled "The Developed Feudal State", explains that the feudal state reached its height when it formed a hierarchical society of numerous strata, with the lower stratum bound to render service to the stratum above it and the superior stratum bound to render protection to the one below. The pyramid rested on the laboring population, the majority of whom were peasants, and their surplus labor was used to support the upper strata of society. Anyone not in a feudal relation to a superior was considered to be outside the law, and therefore had no claim for protection or justice. The new ruling class had just as much divine right as the former master group. Ethnic group consciousness disappeared completely, and only the difference of classes remained. Theories of the group changed to theories of the class.

=== Modern states ===
Chapter 6, "The Development of the Constitutional State", argues that the outcome of the feudal state is determined primarily by the independent development of social institutions called into being by economic means. While foreign influence can also impact a state's development, the rule is that forces from within lead the matured feudal state on the same path to the same conclusion. The creators of economic means controlling this advance are the cities and their system of money economy, which gradually supersedes the system of natural economy. Section (a), "The Emancipation of the Peasantry", argues that the emancipation of the peasantry is "a natural consequence of the basic premise of the feudal state." As great private landlords become a landed nobility, the feudal system of natural economy breaks apart. "The more the territorial magnate ceases to be a private landlord, the more exclusively he tends to become a subject of public law, viz., prince of a territory, the more the solidarity mentioned above, between prince and people grows." The chapter argues that in a developed feudal state, the services required of peasants must be limited, and all surplus belongs to the landlord. "With this change, the character of landed property has been utterly revolutionized."

Section (b), "The Genesis of the Industrial State", discusses the genesis of the industrial city and how it is opposed to the state. He states that the historical city already existed, which was a result of a political or religious need, but the industrial city develops spontaneously from the existing and matured division of labor. The industrial city is the place of economic means, or the exchange and interchange for equivalent values between rural production and manufacture. Oppenheimer argues that the industrial city "as an economic, political body undermines the feudal system with political and economic arms." He explains that the cities "favor immigration with all their powers", since both divisions of labor and wealth increase with increased citizenship. Oppenheimer also discusses the rediscovery of free labor and the status of the peasant and citizen within the city walls.

Section (c), "The Influences of Money Economy", discusses the effects of money economy on the sociological process. The introduction of the system of money economy results in the central government becoming "almost omnipotent, while the local powers are reduced to complete impotence." "During the prevalence of the system of natural economy there is no other way of obtaining them save by dominion; the wardens of the marches and the territorial princes obtain their wealth by their political power." As soon as the products of agriculture became exchangeable for enticing wares, feudal lords decreased the number of peasants to increase net product of their real estate, which they sold for goods. "With this event, as with one blow, the central power, that of king or territorial prince, is without a rival for the dominion, and has become politically omnipotent." Firearms played a role in the agrarian revolution that further strengthened the central power. There is also "a second creation of the system of payment in money", which is officialdom, further enhancing "the infinite increase in the power of the crown."

Section (d), "The Modern Constitutional State", discusses the mechanics and kinetics of the modern constitutional state, which shares the same principles as the primitive robber state or the feudal state but has added the element of officialdom. The modern state's form is domination, and its content is still the exploitation of economic means. There are only two classes in the state, a ruling class and a subject class. Between these two classes is "a transitional class, which also may be subdivided into various strata", and members of this class "render unrequited service to the upper class, and receive unrequited service from the lower classes." "The interests of every class set in motion an actual body of associated forces, which impel it with a definite momentum toward the attainment of a definite goal", and "every class attempts to obtain as large a share as possible of the national production", resulting in class contest. "This contest of classes is the content of all history of states, except in so far as the interest of the state as a whole produces common actions."

=== Future states ===
Chapter 7, "The Tendency of the Development of the State", discusses the future development of the state. Oppenheimer believes that the state will change its vital element by disappearing the economic exploitation of one class by another. In the future, the state will be without classes or class interests, and the bureaucracy will truly become an "impartial guardian of the common interests", which it currently attempts to achieve. "The 'state' of the future will be 'society' guided by self-government", with no government or exploitation. Oppenheimer argues that "this prognosis may be substantiated in two ways, one through history and philosophy, the other by political economy, as a tendency of the development of the state, and as a tendency of the evolution of economics, both clearly tending toward one point."

Oppenheimer argues that there is still a remnant of the antique law of war in the form of the ownership of large estates, which has survived because of its disguise as an economic right. The surplus supply of "free laborers" in the capitalist system is a consequence of the right of holding landed property in large estates. This surplus supply can be traced back to emigration from these estates into towns and oversea, which created the competition from oversea and perpetually lowered wages. However, this "system is their bleeding to death, without hope of salvation, caused by the freedom of the former serfs" – and the development of economics will eventually destroy it. When vast estates disappear, "economic means alone will exercise sway", and "the last remaining vestige of the political means will have been destroyed", resulting in the content of such a society as the "pure economics" of "the equivalent exchange of commodities against commodities", and the political form of this society will be the "freemen's citizenship". The author substantiates this argument with reference to other books and examples from history.

== Publication history ==
The State was first published in Germany in 1907. The 1922 English edition does not include the alterations Oppenheimer made to the 1929 German edition. In his introduction to the 1922 edition, Oppenheimer refers to authoritative editions of the work in English, French, Hungarian and Serbian, noting in addition the proliferation of pirated editions in Japanese, Hebrew, Russian and Yiddish.

- Oppenheimer, Franz (1972). The State; Its History and Development Viewed Sociologically. New York: Arno Press. ISBN 0-405-00433-8.
- Oppenheimer, Franz (1975). The State. New York: Free Life Editions. ISBN 0-914156-04-7.
- Oppenheimer, Franz (1997). The State. Fox & Wilkes. ISBN 0-930073-23-1. (paperback)
- Oppenheimer, Franz (1997). The State. Fox & Wilkes. ISBN 0-930073-22-3. (hardback)
- Oppenheimer, Franz (1999). The State: Its History and Development Viewed Sociologically. New Brunswick: Transaction Publishers. ISBN 1-56000-965-9.
- Oppenheimer, Franz (2007). The State. Montréal: Black Rose Books. ISBN 978-1-55164-300-7.

== See also ==
- Anarcho-capitalist literature
- Left-libertarianism
- Market socialism
- Fragments of an Anarchist Anthropology
