= Albert Jay Nock =

American writer, social theorist, and critic (1870–1945)

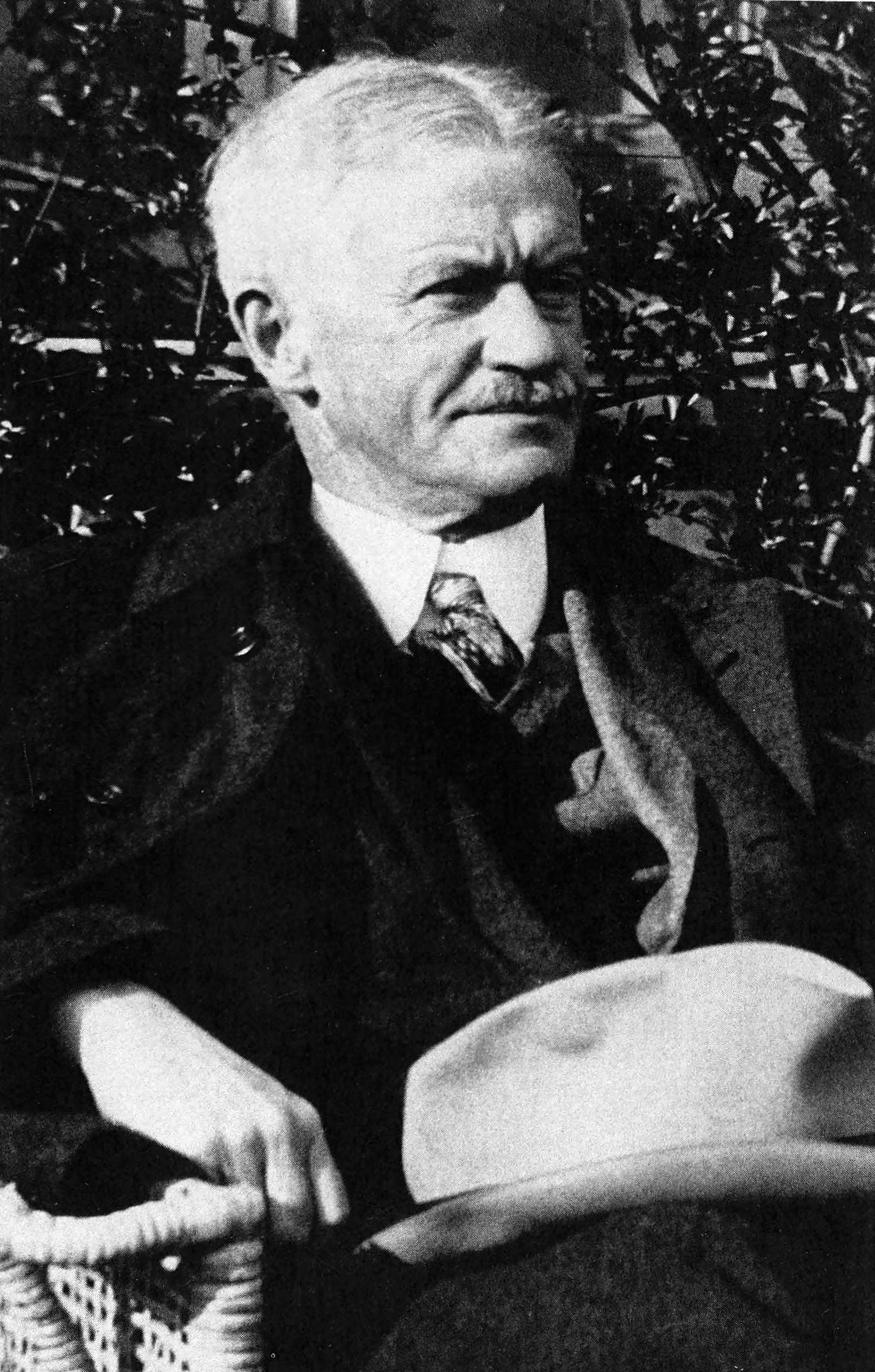
- Born: October 13, 1870; Scranton, Pennsylvania, U.S.
- Died: August 19, 1945 (aged 74); Wakefield, Rhode Island, U.S.
- Resting place: Riverside Cemetery; South Kingstown, Rhode Island
- Education: St. Stephen's College (now known as Bard College)
- Occupations: Writer and social theorist
- Writing career
- Language: English
- Period: 1922–1943
- Subject: Political philosophy
- Notable work: Our Enemy, the State
- Movements: Old Right; Libertarianism

Albert Jay Nock (October 13, 1870 – August 19, 1945) was an American libertarian author, editor first of The Nation and then The Freeman, educational theorist, Georgist, and social critic of the early and middle 20th century. He was an outspoken opponent of the New Deal, and served as a fundamental inspiration for the modern libertarian and conservative movements, cited as an influence by William F. Buckley Jr. He was one of the first Americans to self-identify as a political "libertarian". His best-known books are Memoirs of a Superfluous Man and Our Enemy, the State.

== Life and work ==
Throughout his life, Nock was a deeply private man who shared few of the details of his personal life with his working partners. He was born in Scranton, Pennsylvania, the son of Emma Sheldon Jay and Joseph Albert Nock, who was both a steelworker and an Episcopal priest. He was raised in Brooklyn, New York. Nock attended St. Stephen's College (now known as Bard College) from 1884 to 1888, where he joined Sigma Alpha Epsilon fraternity.

After graduation he had a brief career playing minor league baseball, and then attended a theological seminary and was ordained as an Episcopal priest in 1897. Nock married Agnes Grumbine in 1900 and the couple had two children, Francis and Samuel (both of whom became college professors). In 1909, Nock left the ministry as well as his wife and children, and became a journalist.

In 1914, Nock joined the staff of The Nation magazine, which at the time was more aligned with liberal capitalism. Nock was an acquaintance of the influential politician and orator William Jennings Bryan, and in 1915 traveled to Europe on a special assignment for Bryan, who was then Secretary of State. Nock also maintained friendships with many of the leading proponents of the Georgist movement.

However, while Nock was a lifelong admirer of Henry George, he was frequently at odds with other Georgists in the left-leaning movement. Further, Nock was influenced by the anti-collectivist writings of the German sociologist Franz Oppenheimer, whose most famous work, Der Staat, was published in English translation in 1915. In his own writings, Nock would later build on Oppenheimer's claim that the pursuit of human ends can be divided into two forms: the productive or economic means, and the parasitic, political means.

Between 1920 and 1924, Nock was the co-editor of The Freeman. The Freeman was initially conceived as a vehicle for the single tax movement. It was financed by the wealthy wife of the magazine's other editor, Francis Neilson, although neither Nock nor Neilson was a dedicated single taxer. Contributors to The Freeman included: Charles A. Beard, William Henry Chamberlin, Thomas Mann, Lewis Mumford, Bertrand Russell, Lincoln Steffens, Louis Untermeyer, Thorstein Veblen and Suzanne La Follette, the more libertarian cousin of Senator Robert M. La Follette. Critic H.L. Mencken wrote:

His editorials during the three brief years of the Freeman set a mark that no other man of his trade has ever quite managed to reach. They were well-informed and sometimes even learned, but there was never the slightest trace of pedantry in them.

When the unprofitable The Freeman ceased publication in 1924, Nock became a freelance journalist in New York City and Brussels, Belgium.

"The Myth of a Guilty Nation", which came out in 1922, was Albert Jay Nock's first anti-war book, a cause he backed his entire life as an essential component of a libertarian outlook. The burden of the book is to prove American war propaganda to be false. The purpose of World War I, according to Nock, was not to liberate Europe and the world from German imperialism and threats. If there was a conspiracy, it was by the allied powers to broadcast a public message that was completely contradicted by its own diplomatic cables. Along with that came war propaganda designed to make Germany into a devil nation.

In the mid-1920s, a small group of wealthy American admirers funded Nock's literary and historical work to enable him to follow his own interests. Shortly thereafter, he published his biography of Thomas Jefferson. When Jefferson was published in 1928, Mencken praised it as "the work of a subtle and highly dexterous craftsman" which cleared "off the vast mountain of doctrinaire rubbish that has risen above Jefferson's bones and also provides a clear and comprehensive account of the Jeffersonian system", and the "essence of it is that Jefferson divided all mankind into two classes, the producers and the exploiters, and he was for the former first, last and all the time." Mencken also thought the book to be accurate, shrewd, well-ordered and charming.

In his two 1932 books, On the Disadvantages of Being Educated and Other Essays and Theory of Education in the United States, Nock launched a scathing critique of modern government-run education.

In his 1936 article "Isaiah's Job", which appeared in The Atlantic Monthly and was reprinted in pamphlet form in July 1962 by The Foundation for Economic Education, Nock expressed his complete disillusionment with the idea of reforming the current system. Believing that it would be impossible to persuade any large portion of the general population of the correct course and opposing any suggestion of a violent revolution, Nock instead argued that libertarians should focus on nurturing what he called "the Remnant".

The Remnant, according to Nock, consisted of a small minority who understood the nature of the state and society, and who would become influential only after the current dangerous course had become thoroughly and obviously untenable, a situation which might not occur until far into the future. Nock's philosophy of the Remnant was influenced by the deep pessimism and elitism that social critic Ralph Adams Cram expressed in a 1932 essay, "Why We Do Not Behave Like Human Beings". In his Memoirs of a Superfluous Man, Nock makes no secret that his educators:

did not pretend to believe that everyone is educable, for they knew, on the contrary, that very few are educable, very few indeed. They saw this as a fact of nature, like the fact that few are six feet tall. [...] They accepted the fact that there are practicable ranges of intellectual and spiritual experience which nature has opened to some and closed to others.

In 1941, Nock published a two-part essay in The Atlantic Monthly titled "The Jewish Problem in America". The articles were part of a multi-author series, assembled by the editors in response to recent antisemitic unrest in Brooklyn and elsewhere "in the hope that a free and forthright debate will reduce the pressure, now dangerously high, and leave us with a healthier understanding of the human elements involved."

Nock's argument was that the Jews were an Oriental people, acceptable to the "intelligent Occidental" yet forever strangers to "the Occidental mass-man." Furthermore, the mass-man "is inclined to be more resentful of the Oriental as a competitor than of another Occidental"; the American masses are "the great rope and lamppost artists of the world"; and in studying Jewish history, "one is struck with the fact that persecutions never have originated in an upper class movement". This innate hostility of the masses, he concluded, might be exploited by a scapegoating state to distract from "any shocks of an economic dislocation that may occur in the years ahead." He concluded, "If I keep up my family's record of longevity, I think it is not impossible that I shall live to see the Nuremberg laws reenacted in this country and enforced with vigor" and affirmed that the consequences of such a pogrom "would be as appalling in their extent and magnitude as anything seen since the Middle Ages."

The articles were themselves declared by some commentators to be antisemitic, and Nock was never asked to write another article, effectively ending his career as a social critic. Against charges of antisemitism, Nock answered, "Someone asked me years ago if it were true that I disliked Jews, and I replied that it was certainly true, not at all because they are Jews but because they are folks, and I don't like folks."

In 1943, two years before his death, Nock published his autobiography, Memoirs of a Superfluous Man, the title of which expressed the degree of Nock's disillusionment and alienation from current social trends. After the publication of this autobiography, Nock was a frequent guest at the Sharon, Connecticut house of oilman William F. Buckley Sr., whose son, William F. Buckley Jr., would later become an influential author and speaker.

Nock died of leukemia in 1945, at the Wakefield, Rhode Island home of his longtime friend, Ruth Robinson, the illustrator of his 1934 book, A Journey into Rabelais' France. He is buried in Riverside Cemetery, in Wakefield.

== Thought ==
Describing himself as a philosophical anarchist, Nock called for a radical vision of society free from the influence of the political state. He described the state as that which "claims and exercises the monopoly of crime". He opposed centralization, regulation, the income tax, and mandatory education, along with what he saw as the degradation of society. He denounced in equal terms all forms of totalitarianism, including "Bolshevism... Fascism, Nazism, Marxism, [and] Communism" but also harshly criticized democracy. Instead, Nock argued, "The practical reason for freedom is that freedom seems to be the only condition under which any kind of substantial moral fiber can be developed. Everything else has been tried, world without end. Going dead against reason and experience, we have tried law, compulsion and authoritarianism of various kinds, and the result is nothing to be proud of."

During the 1930s, Nock was one of the most consistent critics of Franklin Roosevelt's New Deal programs. In Our Enemy, the State, Nock argued that the New Deal was merely a pretext for the federal government to increase its control over society. He was dismayed that the president had gathered unprecedented power in his own hands and called this development an out-and-out coup d'état. Nock criticized those who believed that the new regimentation of the economy was temporary, arguing that it would prove a permanent shift. He believed that the inflationary monetary policy of the Republican administrations of the 1920s was responsible for the onset of the Great Depression and that the New Deal was responsible for perpetuating it.

Nock was also a passionate opponent of war, and what he considered the US government's aggressive foreign policy. He believed that war could bring out only the worst in society and argued that it led inevitably to collectivization and militarization and "fortified a universal faith in violence; it set in motion endless adventures in imperialism, endless nationalist ambitions", while, at the same time, costing countless human lives. During the First World War, Nock wrote for The Nation, which was censored by the Wilson administration for opposing the war.

Despite his distaste for communism, Nock harshly criticized the Allied intervention in the Russian Civil War following the parliamentary revolution and Bolshevik coup in that country. Before the Second World War, Nock wrote a series of articles deploring what he saw as Roosevelt's gamesmanship and interventionism leading inevitably to US involvement. Nock was one of the few who maintained a principled opposition to the war throughout its course.

Despite becoming considerably more obscure in death than he had been in life, Nock was an important influence on the next generation of laissez-faire capitalist American thinkers, including libertarians such as Murray Rothbard, Frank Chodorov, and Leonard Read, and conservatives such as William F. Buckley Jr. Nock's conservative view of society would help inspire the paleoconservative movement in response to the development of neoconservatism during the Cold War. In insisting on the state itself as the root problem, Nock's thought was one of the main precursors to anarcho-capitalism.

== Antisemitism and disillusionment with democracy ==
When Albert Jay Nock started The Freeman magazine in 1920, The Nation offered its congratulations to a new voice in liberal journalism. Nock rebuffed the gesture in a letter to the magazine's owner, Oswald Villard, in which he wrote, "I hate to seem ungrateful, but we haint liberal. We loathes liberalism and loathes it hard", identifying himself with Radicalism. Nock professed allegiance to a detached philosophical objectivity, expressed in his Platonist credo of "seeing things as they are". He had decried antisemitism in his earlier writings, but in his sixties he began giving vent to increasingly antisemitic and anti-democratic sentiments, leading Robert Sherrill, writing years later in The Nation, to call him "virulently anti-Semitic" and "anti-democratic".

The historian and biographer, Michael Wreszin, compared Nock's disillusionment with democracy and his attacks on the Jewish people to similar feelings held by Henry Adams. Before he died, Nock destroyed all his notes and papers, except a few letters and an autobiographical manuscript published posthumously as Journal of Forgotten Days. (Nock was so secretive about the details of his personal life that Who's Who could not find out his birthdate).

In Journal of Forgotten Days, Nock wrote these passages about the Jews of New York City:

31 August—Leaving for New York today, in great dissatisfaction, to be tied to the public libraries, which are infested with Jews, Turks, infidels, and heretics, such as orthodox members of the Church of England are supposed to pray for in the Good Friday collect.

20 September—The Jewish holiday Yom Kippur yesterday closed New York up as tight as a white-oak knot. One would say there was not a hundred dollars' worth of business done in all the town. It sets one's mind back on Hitler's policy. The question is not what one thinks of it as an American, but what one would think of it if one were a German in Germany, where the control of cultural agencies is so largely in the hands of Jews—the press, drama, music, education, etc.—and where there is, or was, a superb native culture essentially antithetical. Is one's own culture worth fighting for? I think so. I think I would fight for it.

Nock took a jaundiced view of American politics and of American democracy itself, and asserted that in all his life he voted in only one presidential election, in which he cast a write-in vote for Jefferson Davis. In an article he wrote for The American Mercury magazine in 1933 entitled "What the American Votes For", Nock claimed, "My first and only presidential vote was cast many, many years ago. It was dictated by pure instinct."

In Memoirs of a Superfluous Man (1943), Nock had this to say about mass democracy in America:

I could see how "democracy" might do very well in a society of saints and sages led by an Alfred or an Antoninus Pius. Short of that, I was unable to see how it could come to anything but an ochlocracy of mass-men led by a sagacious knave. The collective capacity for bringing forth any other outcome seemed simply not there."

The author Clifton Fadiman, reviewing Memoirs of a Superfluous Man, wrote: "I have not since the days of the early Mencken read a more eloquently written blast against democracy or enjoyed more fully a display of crusted prejudice. Mr. Nock is a highly civilized man who does not like our civilization and will have no part of it." Nock's biographer Michael Wreszin wrote concerning Nock's reaction to the election of Franklin D. Roosevelt in 1932: "Sailing to Brussels in February 1933, before Roosevelt's inauguration in March, he repeated in a journal his appreciation of Catherine Wilson's observation that the skyline of New York was the finest sight in America when viewed from the deck of an outbound steamer."

== Works ==
- The Myth of a Guilty Nation. New York: B.W. Huebsch, 1922.
- The Freeman Book. B.W. Huebsch, 1924.
- Jefferson. New York: Harcourt, Brace and Company, 1926 (also known as Mr. Jefferson).
- On Doing the Right Thing, and Other Essays. New York: Harper and Brothers, 1928.
- Francis Rabelais: The Man and His Work. Harper and Brothers, 1929.
- The Book of Journeyman: Essays from the New Freeman. New Freeman, 1930.
- The Theory of Education in the United States. New York: Harcourt, Brace and Company, 1932.
- A Journey Into Rabelais's France. William Morrow & Company, 1934.
- A Journal of These Days: June 1932–December 1933. William Morrow & Company, 1934.
- Our Enemy, the State. William Morrow & Company, 1935.
- Free Speech and Plain Language. William Morrow & Company, 1937.
- Henry George: An Essay. William Morrow & Company, 1939.
- Memoirs of a Superfluous Man. New York: Harper and Brothers, 1943.

Miscellany

- World Scouts. World Peace Foundation, 1912.
- "Officialism and Lawlessness." In College Readings on Today and its Problems, Oxford University Press, 1933.
- Meditations in Wall Street, with an introduction by Albert Jay Nock. W. Morrow & Company, 1940.

Published posthumously:

- A Journal of Forgotten Days: May 1934–October 1935. Henry Regnery Company, 1948.
- Letters from Albert Jay Nock, 1924–1945, to Edmund C. Evans, Mrs. Edmund C. Evans, and Ellen Winsor. The Caxton Printers, 1949.
- Snoring as a Fine Art and Twelve Other Essays. Richard R. Smith, 1958.
- Selected Letters of Albert Jay Nock. The Caxton Printers, 1962.
- Cogitations from Albert Jay Nock. The Nockian Society, 1970, revised edition, 1985.
- The State of the Union: Essays in Social Criticism. Liberty Press, 1991.
- The Disadvantages of Being Educated and Other Essays. Hallberg Publishing Corporation, 1996.
