= Thalassocracy =

Sea-based state or society

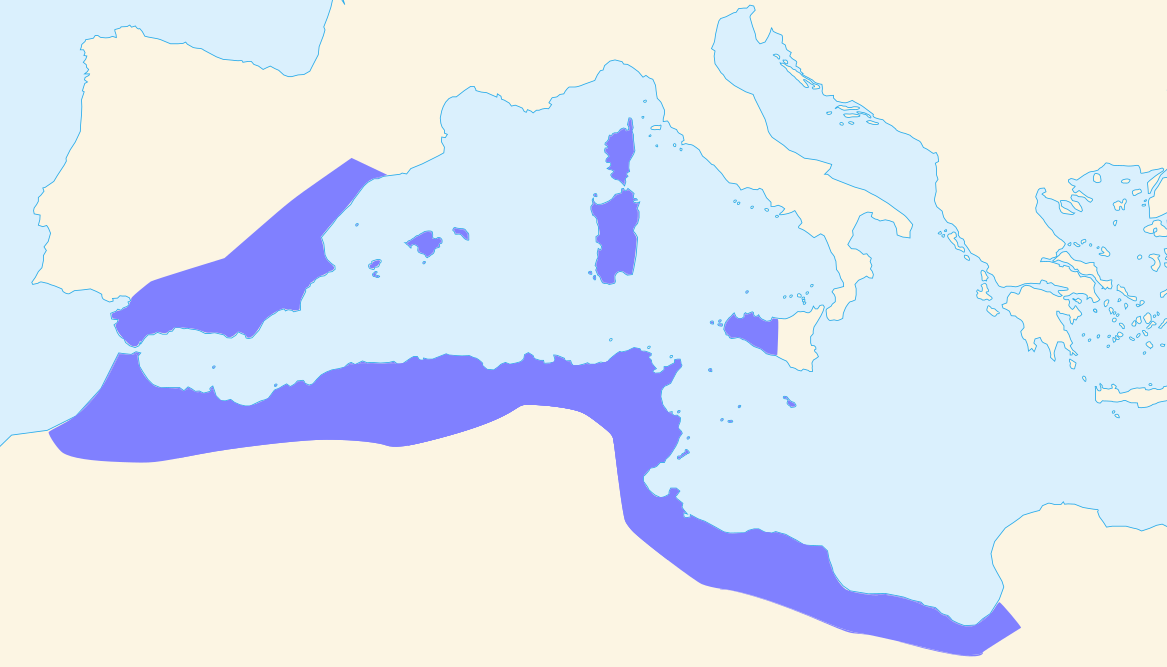
Ancient Carthage from about 323 BCE was an example of a thalassocracy.

A thalassocracy or thalattocracy, sometimes also maritime empire, is a state with primarily maritime realms, an empire at sea, or a seaborne empire.

Traditional thalassocracies seldom dominate interiors, even in their home territories. Examples of this were the Phoenician states of Tyre, Sidon and Carthage; the Delian League of Athens; the Italian maritime republics of Venice and Genoa of the Mediterranean; the Omani Empire of Arabia; and the empires of Srivijaya and Majapahit in Maritime Southeast Asia and the Chola Empire in South Asia.

Thalassocracies can thus be distinguished from traditional empires, where a state's territories, though possibly linked principally or solely by the sea lanes, generally extend into mainland interiors in a tellurocracy ("land-based hegemony").

The term thalassocracy can also simply refer to naval supremacy, in either military or commercial senses. The ancient Greeks first used the word thalassocracy to describe the government of the Minoan civilization, whose power depended on its navy. Herodotus distinguished sea-power from land-power and spoke of the need to counter the Phoenician thalassocracy by developing a Greek "empire of the sea".

Its realization and ideological construct is sometimes called maritimism (cf. Pluricontinentalism or Atlanticism), contrasting continentalism (cf. Eurasianism).

== Origin of the concept: Eusebius' list ==
Thalassocracy was a resurrection of a word known from a very specific classical document, which British classical scholar John Linton Myres termed "the List of Thalassocracies". The list was in the Chronicon, a work of universal history of Eusebius, an early 4th century bishop of Caesarea Maritima. Eusebius categorized several historical polities in the Mediterranean as "sea-controlling", and listed them in a chronology.

The list includes a successive series of "thalassocracies", or exclusive naval domains, beginning with the Lydians after the fall of Troy, and ending with Aegina; each being distinguished by its total control over the sea for a number of years. Since the original list does not mention Aegina's final submission of its naval force to Athens, it was likely compiled before the consolidation of the Athenian-led Delian League.

Eusebius' list is drawn from fragments of Diodorus Siculus' works, and later appeared in 4th-century theologian and historian Jerome's Chronicon, and Byzantine chronicler George Syncellus' Extract of Chronography. German classical scholar Christian Gottlob Heyne reconstructed the list through fragments in 1771. The list was then further surveyed by John Myres in 1906-07 and extensively studied by Molly Miller in the 1970s.

== History and examples ==
=== Indo-Pacific ===
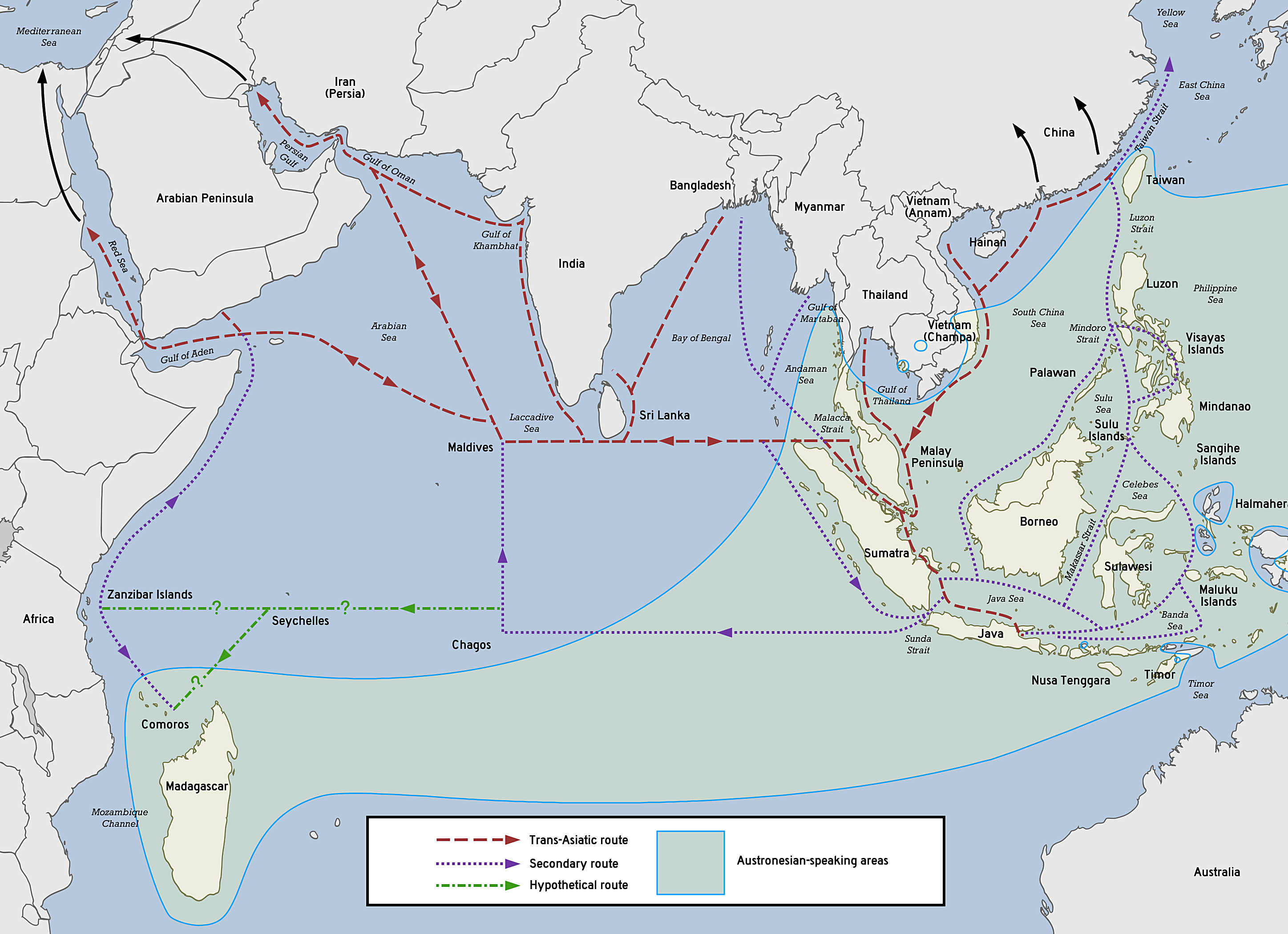
Austronesian proto-historic and historic maritime trade networks in the Indian Ocean

The Austronesian peoples of Maritime Southeast Asia developed the Indian Ocean's first true maritime trade network. They established trade routes with Southern India and Sri Lanka as early as 1500 BC, ushering in an exchange of material culture (like catamarans, outrigger boats, lashed-lug and sewn-plank boats, and paan) and cultigens (like coconuts, sandalwood, bananas, and sugarcane); as well as connecting the material cultures of India and China. Indonesians in particular traded in spices (mainly cinnamon and cassia) with East Africa, using catamaran and outrigger boats and sailing with the help of the Westerlies in the Indian Ocean. This trade network expanded west to Africa and the Arabian Peninsula, resulting in the Austronesian colonization of Madagascar by the first half of the first millennium AD. It continued into historic times, later becoming the Maritime Silk Road.

The first thalassocracies in the Indo-Pacific region began to emerge around the 2nd century AD, through the rise of emporia exploiting the prosperous trade routes between Funan and India through the Malacca Strait using advanced Austronesian sailing technologies. Numerous coastal city-states emerged, centered on trading ports built near or around river mouths which allowed easy access to goods from inland for maritime trade. These city-states established commercial networks with other trading centers in Southeast Asia and beyond. Their rulers also gradually Indianized by adopting the social structures and religions of India to consolidate their power.

The thalassocratic empire of Srivijaya emerged by the 7th century through conquest and subjugation of neighboring thalassocracies. These included Melayu, Kedah, Tarumanagara, and Mataram, among others. These polities controlled the sea lanes in Southeast Asia and exploited the spice trade of the Spice Islands, as well as maritime trade-routes between India and China. Srivijaya was in turn subjugated by Singhasari around 1275, before finally being absorbed by the successor thalassocracy of Majapahit (1293–1527).

The Arakkal Ali Rajas of Kannur, Kerala are another example. Ali Moossa, the fifth ruler is said to have conquered some of the Maladweep (Maldives) islands in 1183–84 CE.

Arakkal Thalassocracy in the Laccadive Sea

The connection with the Maldives and Lakshadweep (Laccadives) was well-known to the Portuguese and other Europeans, with the 9° channel separating Minicoy from the Laccadive group being referred to as the 'Mammali's Channel' after the Arakkal kings. Even during the beginning of the 16th century, the king of Maldives was a tributary of this House. The Jagir of Laccadive islands, received by the Ali Rajas from Kolathiris in the 16th century, enhanced the status of the House. Kannur (Cannanore) could effectively be characterised as a Muslim thalassocracy, acknowledging that the religious identity of the Ali Rajas had a significant role in their political prominence. A link can be made of the income from importing horses from West Asia to the political power of the Ali Rajas throughout the sixteenth century.

=== Europe and the Mediterranean ===
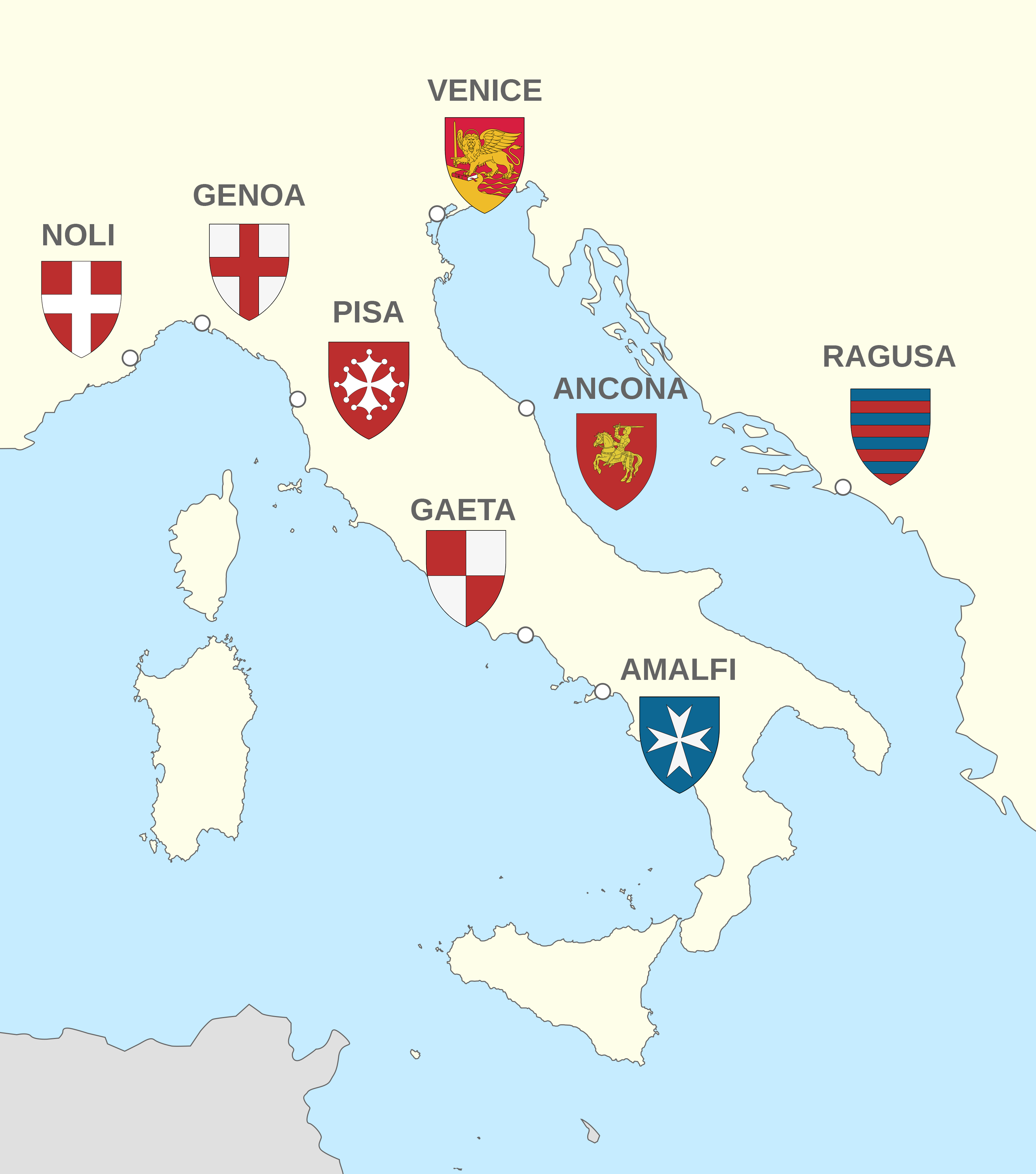
Map and coats of arms of the maritime republics

One of the earliest documented thalassocracies centred on Minoan Crete. Writing in the 5th-century, Thucydides records that Minos "according to tradition" created a navy to dominate the islands of the Cyclades and the Aegean Sea. Whether this force was for the purpose of direct colonial occupation, elimination of pirate raiding or simple trading-facilitation remains uncertain.

Later ancient maritime-centered or seaborne powers in the Mediterranean include the Phoenicians, Athens (the Delian League), Carthage, Liburnians and to a lesser degree the Ptolemaic kingdom, Corinth, Ancient Syracuse, Aegina, Rhodes and other ancient Greek states.

The Middle Ages saw multiple thalassocracies, often land-based empires which controlled areas of the sea; the best-known of them included the Republic of Venice, the Republic of Genoa and the Republic of Pisa; others were: the Duchy of Amalfi, the Republic of Ancona, the Republic of Ragusa, the Duchy of Gaeta and the Republic of Noli. They were known as maritime republics, controlling trade and territories in the Mediterranean Sea for centuries. Their contacts were not only commercial, but also cultural and artistic. They also played an essential role in the Crusades; and the very name of the Crusader states in the Levant: Outremer (overseas) suggests a "Frankish" thalassocracy.

The Venetian republic was conventionally divided in the fifteenth century into the Dogado of Venice and the Lagoon, the Stato di Terraferma of Venetian holdings on land in northern Italy, and the Stato da Màr of the Venetian outlands bound by the sea. According to the French historian Fernand Braudel, Venice was a scattered empire, a trading-post empire forming a long capitalist antenna.

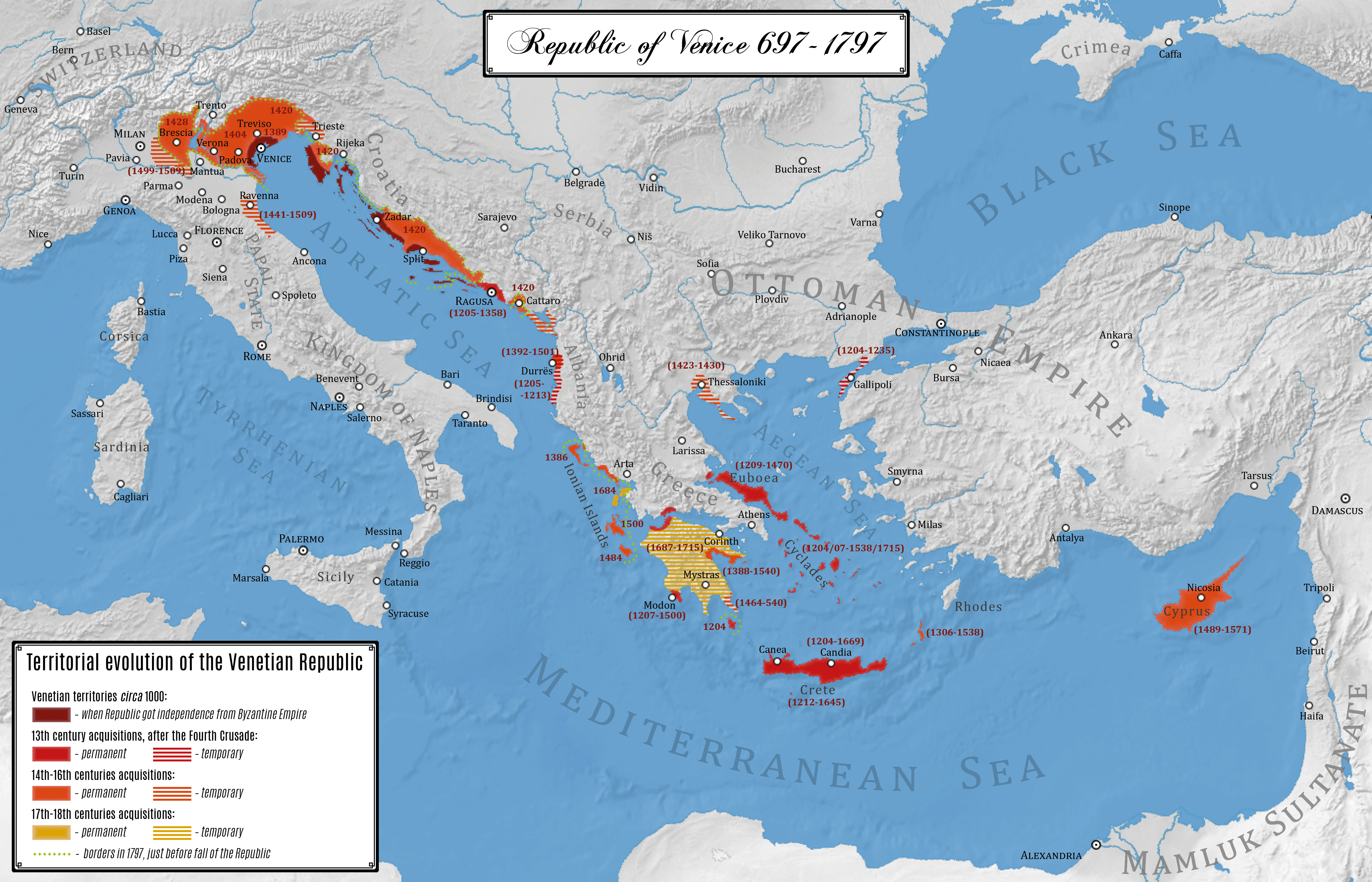
Map of the Venetian overseas domains

From the 12th to the 15th century the Genoese Republic had the monopoly on the Western Mediterranean trade, establishing colonies and trading posts in numerous countries, and eventually came to control regions in the Black Sea as well. It was also one of the largest naval powers of Europe during the Late Middle Ages.

The Early Middle Ages (c. 500–1000 AD) saw many of the coastal cities of Southern Italy develop into minor thalassocracies whose chief powers lay in their ports and in their ability to sail navies to defend friendly coasts and to ravage enemy ones. These include the duchies of Gaeta and Amalfi.

In Northern Europe, the Kingdom of the Isles lasted from the 9th to 13th centuries AD, and comprised the Isle of Man, the Hebrides and other islands off the coast of Great Britain.

Jacques Pirenne saw the North Sea Empire of King Cnut (died 1035) as a late-Viking thalassocracy: it included England, Denmark, and Norway.

During the 14th and 15th centuries, the Crown of Aragon functioned as a thalassocracy controlling a large portion of present-day eastern Spain, parts of what is now southern France and other territories in the Mediterranean. The extent of the Catalan language is a result of this; it is spoken in Alghero on Sardinia.

The thalassocratic Swedish Empire formed in the 17th century on the basis of control of most of the Baltic littoral (Finland, Ingria, Estonia, Livonia, and parts of northern Germany) from Stockholm.

=== Transcontinental ===
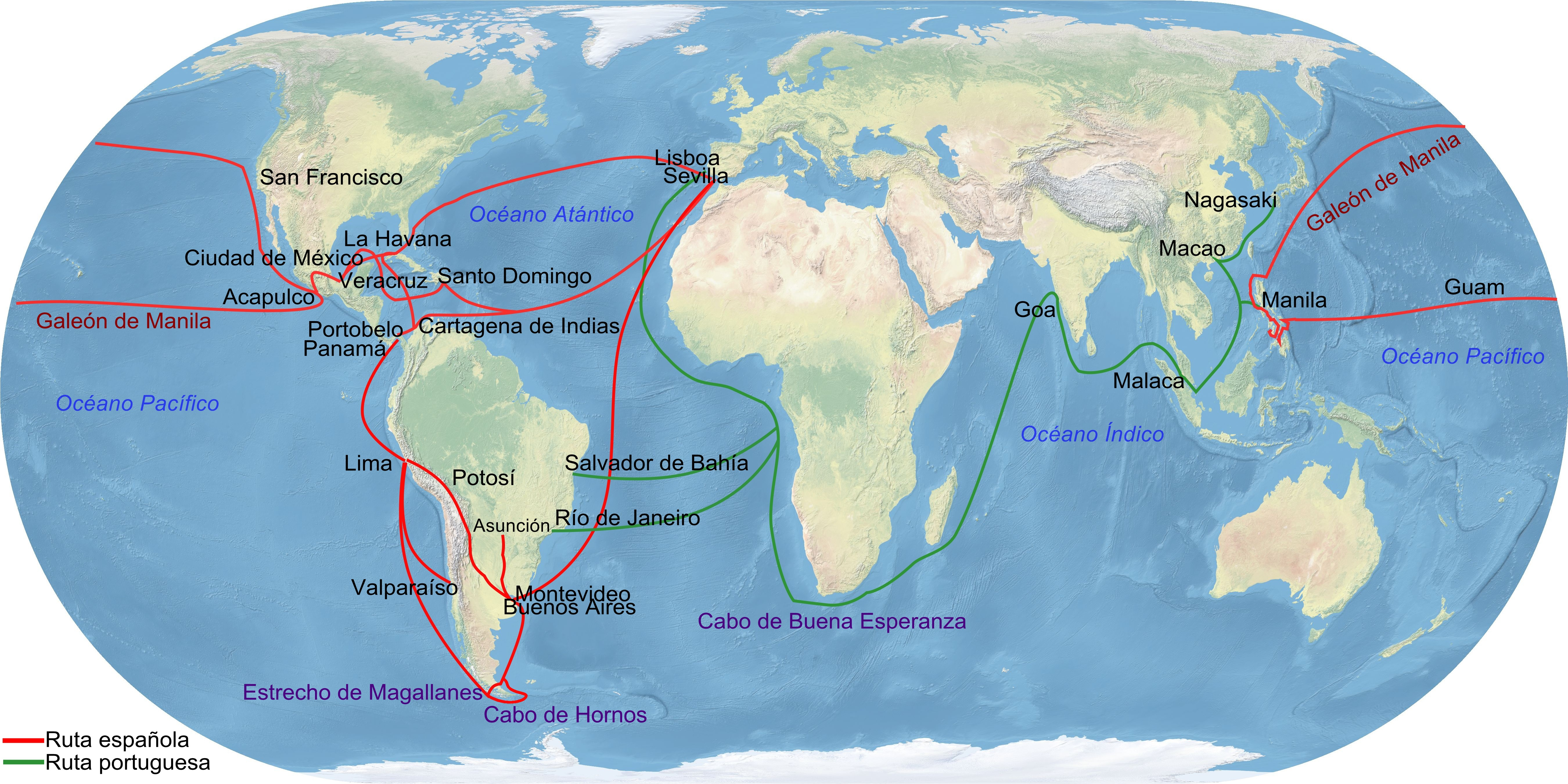
Main trade routes of the Spanish and Portuguese Empires

With the modern age, the Age of Exploration saw some transcontinental thalassocracies emerge. Anchored in their European territories, several nations established colonial empires held together by naval supremacy. First among them chronologically was the Portuguese Empire, followed soon by the Spanish Empire, which was challenged by the Dutch Empire, itself replaced on the high seas by the British Empire, which had large landed possessions held together by the Royal Navy. With naval arms-races (especially between Germany and Britain), the end of colonialism, and the winning of independence by many colonies, European thalassocracies, which had controlled the world's oceans for centuries, diminished—though Britain's power-projection in the Falklands War of 1982 demonstrated continuing thalassocratic clout.

The Ottoman Empire expanded from a land-based region to dominate the Eastern Mediterranean and to expand into the Indian Ocean as a thalassocracy from the 15th century AD.

== List of historical thalassocracies ==
- Aceh Sultanate
- Ajuran Sultanate
- Ancient Carthage
- Arakkal kingdom
- Ardiaei
- Athenian Empire
- British Empire
- Bruneian Sultanate (1368–1888) (Old Brunei)
- Byzantine Empire
- Champa
- Chola Empire
- Crown of Aragon
- Dál Riata
- Delian League
- Demak Sultanate
- Denmark–Norway
- Doric Hexapolis
- Dutch Empire
- Empire of Japan
- French colonial empire
- Frisian Kingdom
- Ancient Greek colonization
- Hanseatic League
- Johor Sultanate
- Kedah
- Kediri Kingdom
- Kilwa Sultanate
- Kingdom of the Isles
- Liburnia
- Majapahit
- Malacca Sultanate
- Maritime republics
  - Republic of Venice
- Maynila
- Mataram kingdom
- Melayu Kingdom
- Minoan civilization
- Mycenaean civilization
- Muscat and Oman
- North Sea Empire
- Norwegian Empire
- Omani Empire
- Phoenicia
- Portuguese Empire
- Ptolemaic kingdom
- Rajahnate of Butuan
- Rajahnate of Cebu
- Republic of Pirates
- Ancient Rhodes
- Roman Republic
- Ryukyu Kingdom
- Singhasari
- Spanish Empire
- Srivijaya
- Sultanate of Gowa
- Sultanate of Maguindanao
- Sultanate of Sulu
- Sultanate of Ternate
- Sultanate of Tidore
- Swedish Empire
- Tarumanagara
- Tundun Kingdom
- Tungning Kingdom
- Tuʻi Tonga Empire
- Yapese Empire

== See also ==
- Alfred Thayer Mahan
- Archipelagic state
- Blue-water navy
- List of transcontinental countries
- List of former transcontinental countries
- Maritime power
- Naval warfare
- Nomadic empire
- Tellurocracy
