= Franz Oppenheimer =

German-American sociologist and political economist (1864–1943)

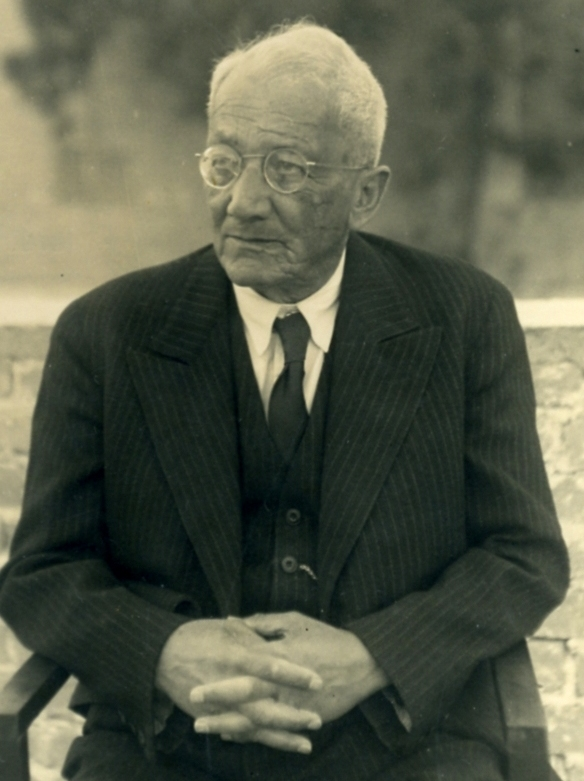
- Franz Oppenheimer in 1936.
- Born: March 30, 1864; Berlin, Kingdom of Prussia
- Died: September 30, 1943 (aged 79); Los Angeles, California, US

Academic background
- Education: University of Kiel
- Influences: David Ricardo, Henry George, Ludwig Gumplowicz

Academic work
- Discipline: Social economy, sociology
- School or tradition: Liberal socialism
- Notable ideas: Conquest theory of state formation

Franz Oppenheimer (March 30, 1864 – September 30, 1943) was a German-American sociologist and political economist, who published also in the area of the fundamental sociology of the state.

== Life and career ==
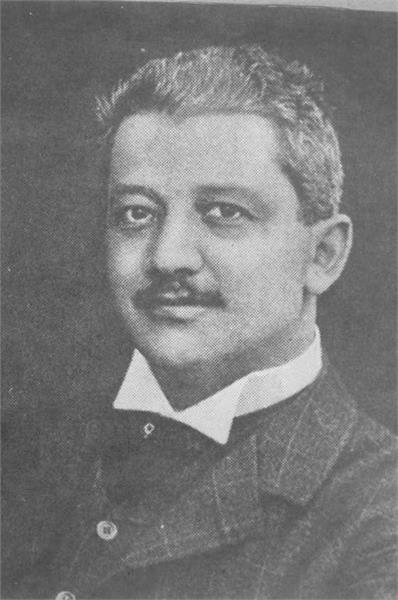
Franz Oppenheimer

Franz Oppenheimer was born into a Jewish family in Berlin in 1864. After studying medicine in Freiburg and Berlin, Oppenheimer practiced as a physician in Berlin from 1886 to 1895. From 1890 onward, he began to concern himself with sociopolitical questions and social economics. After his activity as a physician, he was editor-in-chief of the magazine Welt am Morgen, where he became acquainted with Friedrich Naumann, who was, at the time, working door-to-door for different daily papers.

In 1909, Oppenheimer earned a PhD in Kiel with a thesis about economist David Ricardo. From 1909 to 1917, Oppenheimer was a Privatdozent in Berlin, then for two years Titularprofessor. In 1914 he was one of co-founders of the German Committee for Freeing of Russian Jews. In 1919, he accepted a call to serve as Chair for Sociology and Theoretical Political Economy at Johann Wolfgang Goethe University in Frankfurt/Main. This was the first chair dedicated to Sociology in Germany.

A co-operative farm, the so-called "Co-operative in Merhavia", was founded in 1911 by Jewish immigrants to Ottoman Palestine using a plan for agricultural cooperation written by Oppenheimer. The project eventually failed and Merhavia was transformed in 1922 into a moshav, a different form of communal settlement.

From 1934 to 1935, Oppenheimer taught in Palestine. In 1936 he was appointed an honorary member of the American Sociological Association. In 1938, fleeing Nazi persecution, he emigrated via Tokyo and Shanghai to Los Angeles. In 1941 he became a founding member of The American Journal of Economics and Sociology.

Oppenheimer's son was Hillel Oppenheimer, a professor of botany at the Hebrew University of Jerusalem and an Israel Prize recipient.

== Ideas ==
=== Der Staat (The State) ===
In 1907, Oppenheimer published Der Staat, translated into English in 1922 as The State. The book breaks down the origins of the modern state, identifying it as coming from conquering warlords and robber barons taking control over what would have been relatively free communities, each time ramping up the power of the ruling class.

Unlike Locke and others, Oppenheimer rejected the idea of the "social contract" and contributed to the "conquest theory of the state", heavily influenced by the earlier sociologist Ludwig Gumplowicz and his intertribal, intergroup competition, "race-conflict" (Rassenkampf) theories of the sociological genealogy of the state:

The State, completely in its genesis, essentially and almost completely during the first stages of its existence, is a social institution, forced by a victorious group of men on a defeated group, with the sole purpose of regulating the dominion of the victorious group over the vanquished, and securing itself against revolt from within and attacks from abroad. Teleologically, this dominion had no other purpose than the economic exploitation of the vanquished by the victors. No primitive state known to history originated in any other manner. Wherever a reliable tradition reports otherwise, either it concerns the amalgamation of two fully developed primitive states into one body of more complete organisation, or else it is an adaptation to men of the fable of the sheep which made a bear their king in order to be protected against the wolf. But even in this latter case, the form and content of the State became precisely the same as in those states where nothing intervened, and which became immediately 'wolf states' (p. 15)

Oppenheimer saw the state as the original creator of inequality.

There are two fundamentally opposed means whereby man, requiring sustenance, is impelled to obtain the necessary means for satisfying his desires. These are work and robbery, one's own labor and the forcible appropriation of the labor of others. Robbery! Forcible appropriation! These words convey to us ideas of crime and the penitentiary, since we are the contemporaries of a developed civilization, specifically based on the inviolability of property. And this tang is not lost when we are convinced that land and sea robbery is the primitive relation of life, just as the warrior's trade – which also for a long time is only organized mass robbery – constitutes the most respected of occupations. Both because of this, and also on account of the need of having, in the further development of this study, terse, clear, sharply opposing terms for these very important contrasts, I propose in the following discussion to call one's own labor and the equivalent exchange of one's own labor for the labor of others, the "economic means" for the satisfaction of needs, while the unrequited appropriation of the labor of others will be called the "political means." (pp. 24–25)

Oppenheimer considered himself a liberal socialist and has been described as pro-market; he thought that nonexploitative economic arrangements would work best in a collectivist environment. He spent much of his life advising people who wished to set up a voluntary, communitarian setting (especially kibbutzim). He rejected the view of anarchists and revolutionary socialists as unnecessarily pessimistic. Not violence, but the path of evolution, would bring about the desired social change. His ideal was a state without class or class interests in which the bureaucracy would become the impartial guardian of the common interests.

In the United States Oppenheimer became a popularizer and devotee of the American social reformer Henry George. While Oppenheimer and George regarded the state as a longtime protector of privilege, they also believed that it was radically transformed by democracy. Government administrators were forced to show a humanitarian side which made the political class vulnerable. Oppenheimer, who died in 1943, saw Nazism and Bolshevism as representing last-gasp attempts to resurrect ancient tyranny. He hoped that their downfall would provide the prelude to a truly liberal epoch.

In the 1920s Der Staat was a widely read and heatedly discussed book. It was translated into English, French, Hungarian, Serbian, Japanese, Hebrew, Yiddish, and Russian and has been influential among libertarians, communitarians, and anarchists.

Oppenheimer was the teacher of German chancellor Ludwig Erhard who rejected his collectivism, but attributed to his professor his own vision of a European society of free and equal men. In 1964 Ludwig Erhard declared that:

Something has impressed me so deeply that it can not be lost for me, namely the analysis of the socio-political issues of our time. He recognized that "capitalism" leads to inequality, that it creates inequality outright, although he certainly did not advocate dreary sameness. On the other hand, he hated communism, because it inevitably leads to a lack of freedom. There must be a way – a third way – which preserves a successful synthesis, a resort. Almost on his behalf I have tried to delineate the social market economy as a not sentimental, but realistic way.

== Writings ==
Oppenheimer created an extensive oeuvre of approximately 40 books and 400 essays which contain writings on sociology, economics, and the political questions of his time. One of the most renowned was Der Staat (The State).

- Freiland in Deutschland. Berlin, W.F. Fontane & Co., 1895.
- System der Soziologie. 1922.
- Der Staat. 1929.
- Gesammelte Schriften. Berlin
1. Theoretische Grundlegung. 1995 ISBN 3050026731
2. Politische Schriften. 1996 ISBN 3050028769
3. Schriften zur Marktwirtschaft. 1998 ISBN 3050031565

== See also ==
- Classical liberalism
- Economic sociology
- Georgism
- Left-libertarianism
- Mutualism
- Our Enemy, the State
- Political sociology
- Ricardian socialism
