= Assyriology =

Study of cultures that used cuneiform writing

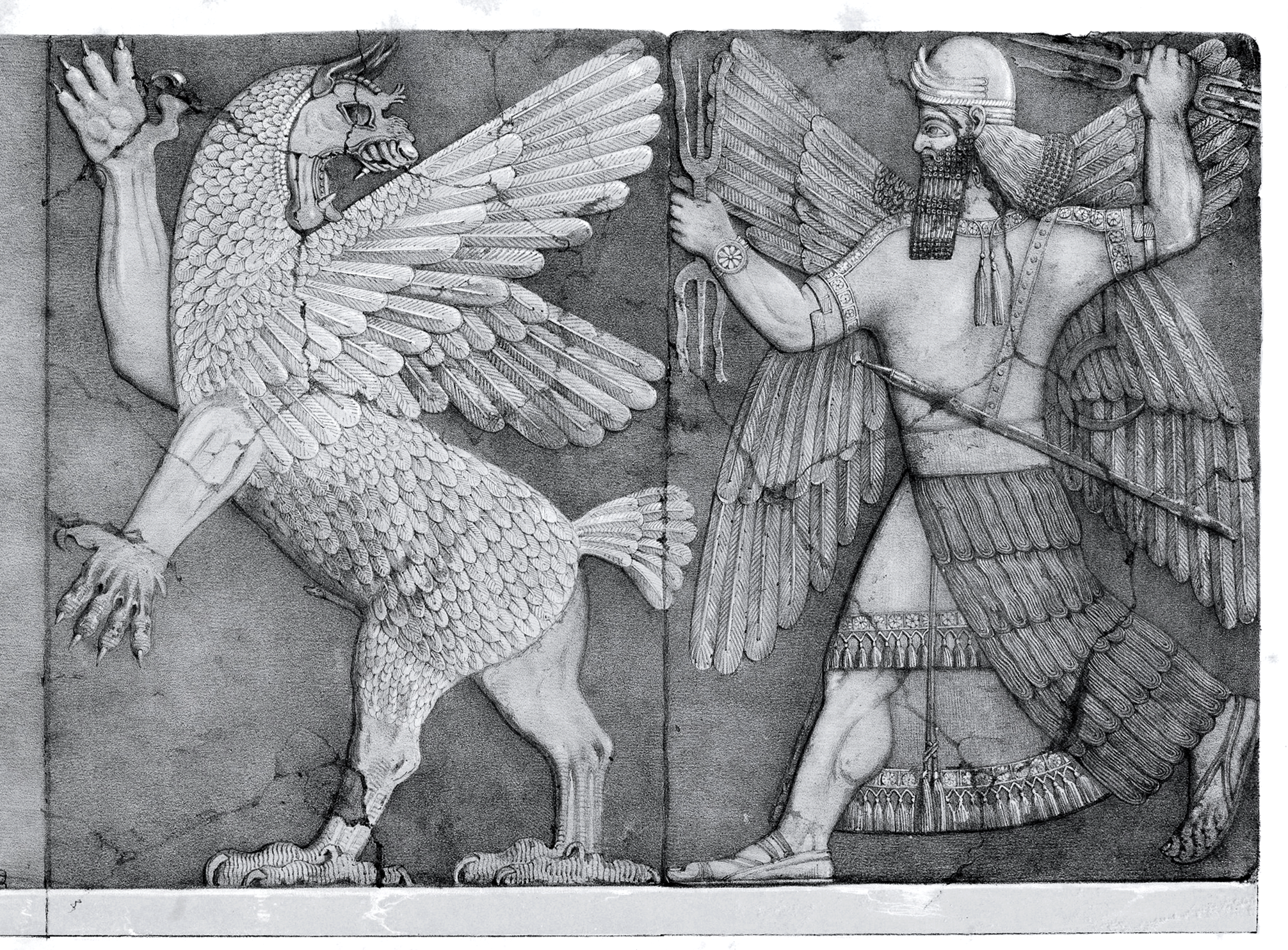
The Mesopotamian god Ninurta with his thunderbolts pursues the divine monster Anzû stealing the Tablet of Destinies from Enlil's sanctuary, Austen Henry Layard Monuments of Nineveh, 2nd Series, 1853

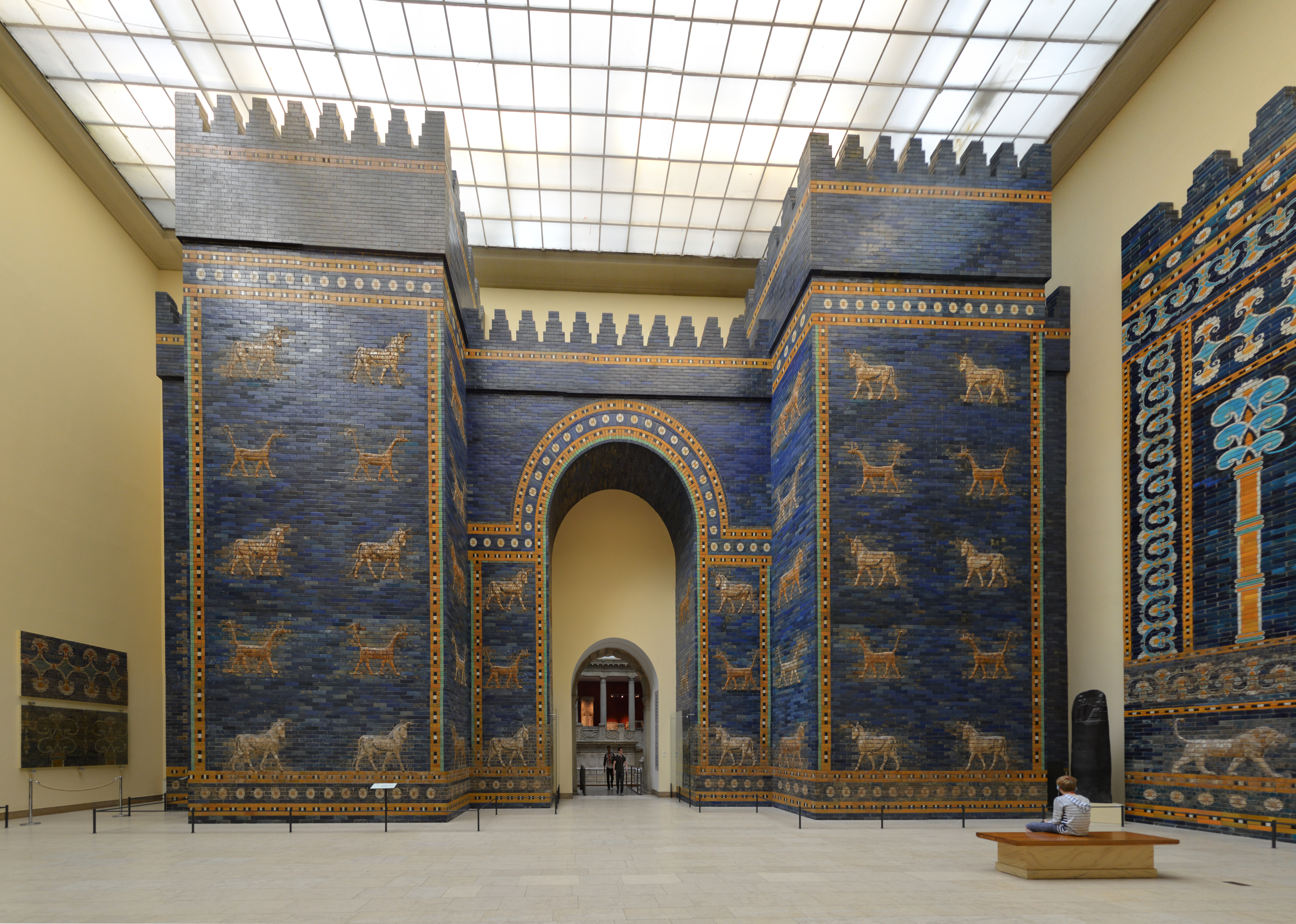
Reconstruction of the Babylonian Ishtar Gate in the Pergamon Museum in Berlin.

Assyriology (from Greek Ἀσσυρίᾱ, Assyriā; and -λογία, -logia), also known as Cuneiform studies or Ancient Near East studies, is the archaeological, anthropological, historical, and linguistic study of the cultures that used cuneiform writing. The field covers Pre Dynastic Mesopotamia, Sumer, the early Sumero-Akkadian city-states, the Akkadian Empire, Ebla, the Akkadian and Imperial Aramaic speaking states of Assyria, Babylonia and the Sealand Dynasty, the migrant foreign dynasties of southern Mesopotamia, including the Gutians, Amorites, Kassites, Arameans, Suteans and Chaldeans. Assyriology can be included to cover Neolithic pre-Dynastic cultures dating to as far back as 8000 BC, to the Islamic Conquest of the 7th century CE.

The large number of cuneiform clay tablets preserved by these Sumero-Akkadian and Assyro-Babylonian cultures provide an extremely large resource for the study of the period. The region's—and the world's—first cities and city-states, like Ur, are archaeologically invaluable for studying the growth of urbanization.

Scholars of Assyriology develop proficiency in the two main languages of Mesopotamia: Akkadian (including its major dialects) and Sumerian. Familiarity with neighbouring languages such as Biblical Hebrew, Hittite, Elamite, Hurrian, Imperial Aramaic, Eastern Aramaic dialects, Old Persian, and Canaanite are useful for comparative purposes, and the knowledge of writing systems that use several hundred core signs. There now exist many important grammatical studies and lexical aids. Although scholars can draw from a large corpus of literature, some tablets are broken, or in the case of literary texts where there may be many copies the language and grammar are often arcane. Scholars must be able to read and understand modern English, French, and German, as important references, dictionaries, and journals are published in those languages.

== Terminology ==
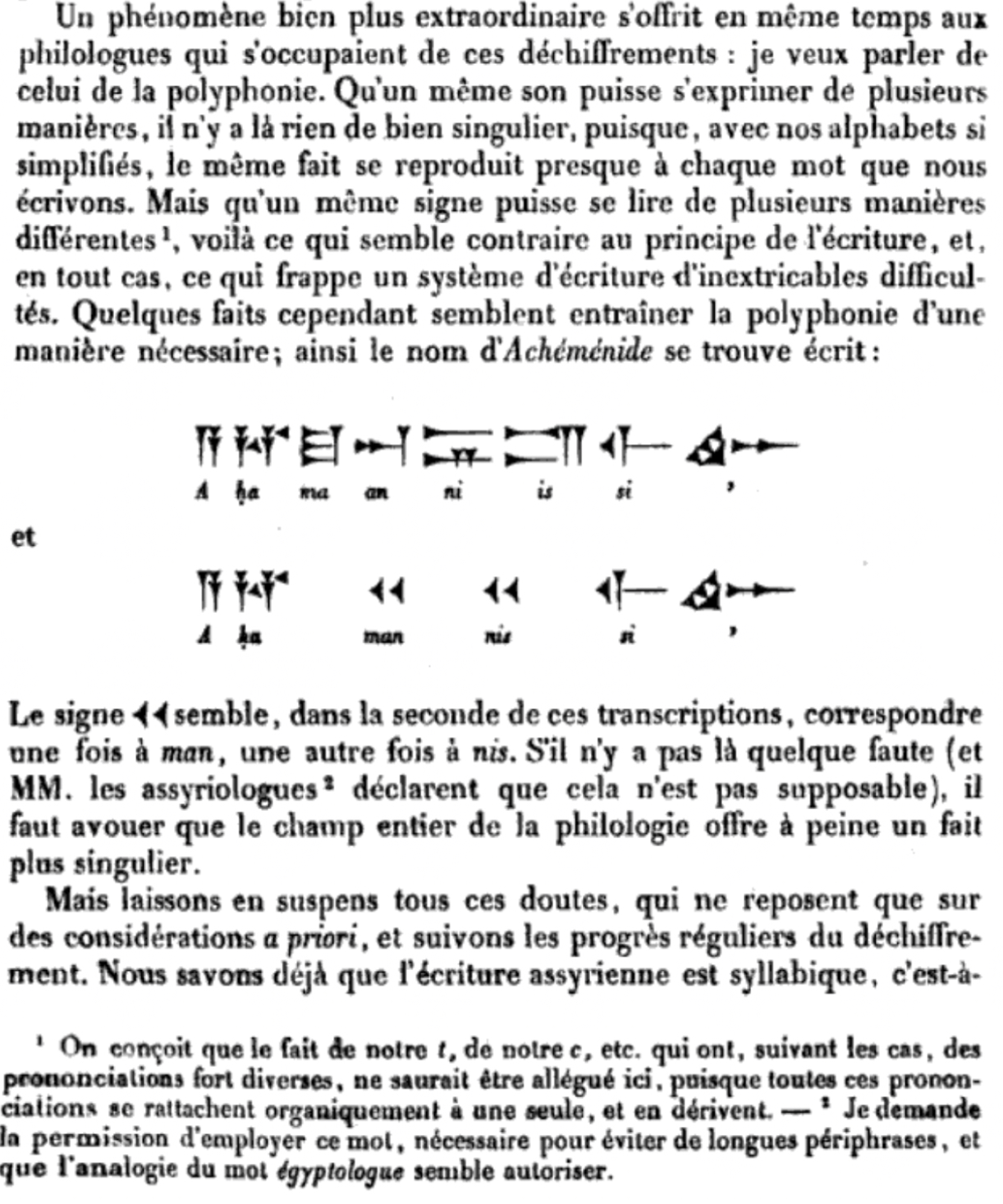
First use of the word Assyriology (Assyriologues), 1859, Ernest Renan

The term was first used by French Orientalist and Semitic scholar Ernest Renan in 1859 as a parallel to the term Egyptology, in a discussion of the translation of Assyrian terms from other cuneiform languages. By 1897 Fritz Hommel described the term as misleading, and today the International Association for Assyriology itself calls the term "old-fashioned".

The term is defined in different ways by different scholars in the field. Today, alternate terms such as "cuneiform studies" or "study of the Ancient Near East" are also used.

Originally Assyriology referred primarily to the study of Assyrian texts discovered in the north of modern-day Iraq, ancient Assyria, following their initial discovery at Khorsabad in 1843. Although the decipherment of Old Persian cuneiform had taken place prior, much of the subsequent decipherment of cuneiform was carried out using the multilingual Achaemenid royal inscriptions, comparing the previously deciphered Persian with the Assyrian cuneiform where used in parallel scripts. Usage of the term began to expand after it was noticed that, in addition to Old Persian and Assyrian, the cuneiform script had been used for a sister language, Babylonian. Babylonian and Assyrian had diverged around 2000 BCE from their ancestor, an older Semitic language that their speakers referred to as "Akkadian".

From 1877, excavations at Girsu showed that before Akkadian, cuneiform had been used to write a completely different language, Sumerian. "Sumerology" therefore gradually became a branch of Assyriology. Subsequent research showed that during the 2nd millennium BC, cuneiform writing had also been used for other languages such as Ugaritic, Hurrian, Hittite or Elamite, which became subsumed under the increasingly ambiguous term Assyriology. Today the term designates the study of texts written in cuneiform script, irrespective of whether the script is from Egypt, Sumer, or Assyria.

== History ==
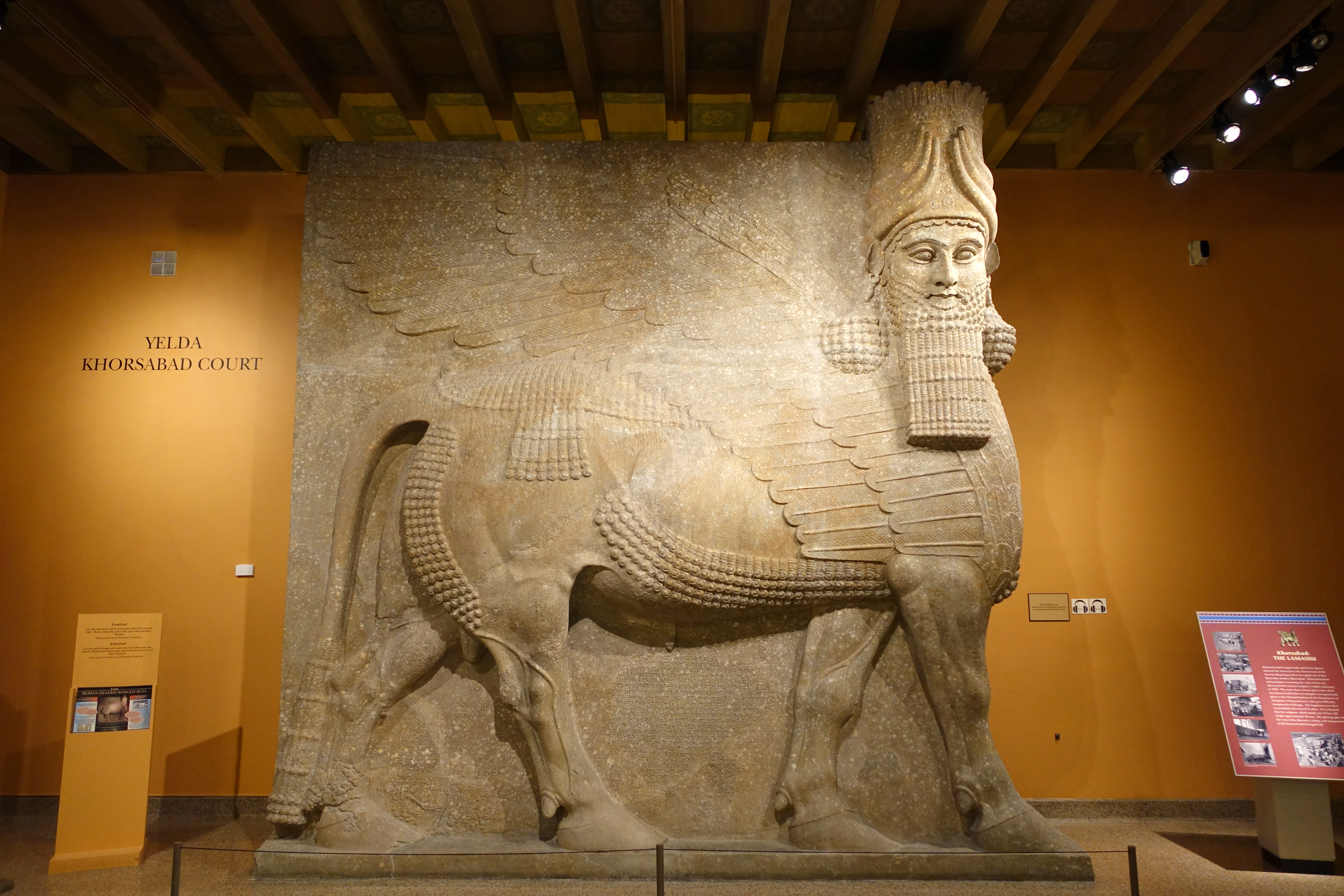
A Lamassu from the Assyrian city of Dur-Sharrukin (Oriental Institute (Chicago)).

=== From classical antiquity to modern excavation ===
For many centuries, European knowledge of Mesopotamia was largely confined to often dubious classical sources, as well as biblical writings. From the Middle Ages onward, there were scattered reports of ancient Mesopotamian ruins. As early as the 12th century, the ruins of Nineveh were correctly identified by Benjamin of Tudela, also known as Benjamin Son of Jonah, a rabbi from Navarre, who visited the Jews of Mosul and the ruins of Assyria during his travels throughout the Middle East. The identification of the city of Babylon was made in 1616 by Pietro Della Valle. Pietro gave "remarkable descriptions" of the site, and brought back to Europe inscribed bricks that he had found at Nineveh and Ur.

=== 18th century and birth ===
Between 1761 and 1767, Carsten Niebuhr, a Danish mathematician, made copies of cuneiform inscriptions at Persepolis in Persia as well as sketches and drawing of Nineveh, and was shortly followed by André Michaux, a French botanist and explorer, who sold the French Bibliothèque Nationale de Paris an inscribed boundary stone found near Baghdad. The first known archeological excavation in Mesopotamia was led by Abbé Beauchamp, papal vicar general at Baghdad, excavating the sculpture now generally known as the "Lion of Babylon." Abbé Beauchamp's memoirs of his travels, published in 1790, sparked a sensation in the scholarly world, generating a number of archeological and academic expeditions to the Middle East.

In 1811, Claudius James Rich, an Englishman and a resident for the East India Company in Baghdad, began examining and mapping the ruins of Babylon and Nineveh, and collecting numerous inscribed bricks, tablets, boundary stones, and cylinders, including the famous Nebuchadnezzar Cylinder and Sennacherib Cylinder, a collection which formed the nucleus of the Mesopotamian antiquities collection at the British Museum. Before his untimely death at the age of 34, Claudius Rich wrote two memoirs on the ruins of Babylon and the inscriptions found therein, two works which may be said to "mark the birth of Assyriology and the related cuneiform studies."

=== Decipherment of cuneiform ===
One of the largest obstacles scholars had to overcome during the early days of Assyriology was the decipherment of curious triangular markings on many of the artifacts and ruins found at Mesopotamian sites. These markings, which were termed "cuneiform" by Thomas Hyde in 1700, were long considered to be merely decorations and ornaments. It was not until late in the 18th century that they came to be considered some sort of writing.

In 1778 Carsten Niebuhr, the Danish mathematician, published accurate copies of three trilingual inscriptions from the ruins at Persepolis. Niebuhr showed that the inscriptions were written from left to right, and that each of the three inscriptions contained three different types of cuneiform writing, which he labelled Class I, Class II, and Class III (now known to be Old Persian, Akkadian, and Elamite).

Class I was determined to be alphabetic and consisting of 44 characters, and was written in Old Persian. It was first deciphered by Georg Friedrich Grotefend (based on work of Friedrich Munter) and Henry Creswicke Rawlinson between 1802 and 1848.

Class II proved more difficult to translate. In 1850, Edward Hincks published a paper showing that the Class II was not alphabetical, but was in fact both syllabic and ideographic, which led to its translation between 1850 and 1859. The language was at first called Babylonian and/or Assyrian, but has now come to be known as Akkadian.

From 1850 onwards, there was a growing suspicion that the Semite inhabitants of Babylon and Assyria were not the inventors of cuneiform system of writing, and that they had instead borrowed it from some other language and culture. In 1850, Edward Hincks published a paper suggesting that cuneiform was instead invented by some non-Semitic people who had preceded the Semites in Babylon. In 1853, Rawlinson came to similar conclusions, and texts written in this more ancient language were identified. At first, this language was called "Akkadian" or "Scythian" but it is now known to be Sumerian. This was the first indication to modern scholarship that this older culture and people, the Sumerians, existed at all.

=== Systematic excavation ===
Systematic excavation of Mesopotamian antiquities was begun in earnest in 1842, with Paul-Émile Botta, the French consul at Mosul. The excavations of P.E. Botta at Khorsabad and Austen H. Layard (from 1845) at Nimrud and Nineveh, as well as the successful decipherment of the cuneiform system of writing opened up a new world. Layard's discovery of the library of Ashurbanipal put the materials for reconstructing the ancient life and history of Assyria and Babylonia into the hands of scholars. He was the first to excavate in Babylonia, where C.J. Rich had already done useful topographical work. Layard's excavations in this latter country were continued by W.K. Loftus, who also opened trenches at Susa, as well as by Julius Oppert on behalf of the French government. But it was only in the last quarter of the 19th century that anything like systematic exploration was attempted.

After the death of George Smith at Aleppo in 1876, an expedition was sent by the British Museum (1877–1879), under the conduct of Hormuzd Rassam, to continue his work at Nineveh and its neighbourhood. Excavations in the mounds of Balaw~t, called Imgur-Bel by the Assyrians, 15 miles east of Mosul, resulted in the discovery of a small temple dedicated to the god of dreams by Ashurnasirpal II (883 BC), containing a stone coffer or ark in which were two inscribed tables of alabaster of rectangular shape, as well as of a palace which had been destroyed by the Babylonians but restored by Shalmaneser III (858 BC). From the latter came the bronze gates with hammered reliefs, which are now in the British Museum.

The remains of a palace of Ashurbanipal at Nimrud (Calah) were also excavated, and hundreds of enamelled tiles were disinterred. Two years later (1880–1881) Rassam was sent to Babylonia, where he discovered the site of the temple of the sun-god of Sippara at Abu-Habba, and so fixed the position of the two Sipparas or Sepharvaim. Abu-Habba lies south-west of Baghdad, midway between the Euphrates and Tigris, on the south side of a canal, which may once have represented the main stream of the Euphrates, Sippara of the goddess Anunit, now Dir, being on its opposite bank.

Meanwhile, from 1877 to 1881, the French consul Ernest de Sarzec had been excavating at Telloh, ancient Girsu, and bringing to light monuments of the pre-Semitic age; these included the diorite statues of Gudea now in the Louvre, the stone of which, according to the inscriptions upon them, had been brought from Magan in the Sinai Peninsula. The subsequent excavations of de Sarzec in Telloh and its neighbourhood carried the history of the city back to at least 4000 BC. A collection of more than 30,000 tablets has been found, which were arranged on shelves in the time of Gudea (c. 2100 BC).

In 1886–1887 a German expedition under Robert Koldewey explored the cemetery of El Hiba (immediately to the south of Telloh), and for the first time made us acquainted with the burial customs of ancient Babylonia. Another German expedition, on a large scale, was despatched by the Orientgesellschaft in 1899 with the object of exploring the ruins of Babylon; the palace of Nebuchadrezzar and the great processional road were laid bare, and W. Andrae subsequently conducted excavations at Qal'at Sherqat, the site of Assur.

Even the Turkish government has not held aloof from the work of exploration, and the Museum at Istanbul is filled with the tablets discovered by V. Scheil in 1897 on the site of Sippara. Jacques de Morgan's exceptionally important work at Susa lies outside the limits of Babylonia. Not so, the American excavations (1903–1904) under EJ Banks at Bismaya (Ijdab), and those of the University of Pennsylvania at Nippur between 1889 and 1900, where Mr JH Haynes has systematically and patiently uncovered the remains of the great temple of El-lil, removing layer after layer of debris and cutting sections in the ruins down to the virgin soil.

Midway in the mound is a platform of large bricks stamped with the names of Sargon of Akkad and his son, Naram-Sin (2300 BC). As the debris above them is 34 feet thick, the topmost stratum being not later than the Parthian era (HV Hilprecht, The Babylonian Expedition, p. 23), it is calculated that the debris underneath the pavement, 30 feet thick, must represent a period of about 3000 years, more especially as older constructions had to be leveled before the pavement was laid. In the deepest part of the excavations, inscribed clay tablets and fragments of stone vases are still found, though the cuneiform characters upon them are of a very archaic type, and sometimes even retain their primitive pictorial forms.

=== Digital Assyriology ===
also known as Digital Ancient Near Eastern Studies (DANES). Analogous to the development of the digital humanities and accompanying the digitization of the subject, computer-based methods are being developed jointly with computer science, the roots of which can be found in the late 1960s in the work of Gerhard Sperl. In 2023, an open data set was published and used to train an artificial intelligence enabling the recognition of cuneiform signs in photographs and 3D-models.

== Important publications ==
- Keilschrifttexte aus Assur religiösen Inhalts (1919), a two-volume compendium of cuneiform inscriptions by Erich Ebeling.

== See also ==
- Ancient Near East
- Ancient Near East studies
- Aramaic studies
- Egyptology
- Hebraic studies
- Hittitology
- Iranian studies
- List of Assyriologists
- Mesopotamia in Classical literature
- Near Eastern archaeology
