= Chronicon (Jacob of Edessa) =

The Chronicon of Jacob of Edessa (full title: The Chronicle which is a Continuation of that of Eusebius) is a universal history combining biblical history, classical chronology, and contemporary events, written in the Syriac language in the 7th century. Jacob, a Syriac Orthodox monk and bishop, worked on the Chronicon until 692 AD, and it was completed by one of his students around 710, after his death. Jacob's Chronicon served as the continuation of the earlier Chronicon of Eusebius (died 339), serving to cover the three and a half centuries that had transpired since his death. The document is lost, and its reconstruction is based on a fragmentary manuscript (British Library Additional MS 14,685) and quotations of the work by Michael the Syrian and Elijah of Nisibis.

Jacob's Chronicon, though lost, had a lasting influence on Syriac historiography, and informed chronicles from later periods, such as the Chronicle of Zuqnin. The work was also used by later medieval Syriac historians, such as Michael the Syrian and Elijah of Nisibis.

== Content ==
The Chronicon is, ultimately, a history of the world up until the time of Jacob. It opens with a brief preface, highlighting the earlier work in this genre by Eusebius, and correcting Eusebius on a few issues concerning dating and lists of kings. As the Chronicon of Eusebius covered events up to the year 326 AD, Jacob's provides a year-by-year continuation from 326 onwards arranged in a tabular format. Years for events are given according to multiple calendrical systems, including the Roman and Sasanian years. The only extant manuscript breaks off at events up to 631 AD, but information from Michael the Syrian shows that the original text continued until the year 710.

== Editions ==
- Brooks, E. W., Guidi, Ignazio, and Chabot, Jean-Baptiste (eds.). Chronica Minora: Scriptores Syri, vols. III–IV. Leipzig: Otto Harrassowitz; Louvain: Secretariat du Corpus Scriptorum Christianorum Orientalium, 1905–1907.
  - Volume III (Textus – Syriac text) – including Chronicon Iacobi Edesseni fragments and related material.
  - Volume IV (Versio – Latin translation).

== Translations ==
- Brooks, E. W. (1899a). "The Chronological Canon of James of Edessa". Zeitschrift der Deutschen Morgenländischen Gesellschaft. 53 (2): 261–327. JSTOR 43362689.
  - Brooks, E. W. (1899b). "Errata in "The Chronological Canon of James of Edessa" (ZDMG. 53, p. 261 ff.)". Zeitschrift der Deutschen Morgenländischen Gesellschaft. 53 (3): 550. JSTOR 43362718.
- Brooks, E. W. (1900). "The Chronological Canon of James of Edessa". Zeitschrift der Deutschen Morgenländischen Gesellschaft. 54 (1): 100–102. JSTOR 43362847.

== See also ==
- Chronicon
