= Chronicon complutense =

The Chronicon complutense sive alcobacense ("Complutensian Chronicle, that is, [from a manuscript] of Alcalá de Henares [ancient Complutum]") is a short medieval Latin history, in the form of annals, of events in Galicia and Portugal up to the death of Ferdinand I "the Great", whom the anonymous chronicler lauds as an "exceedingly strong emperor" (imperator fortissimus), in 1065. It is the earliest "chronicon" dealing with Galaico-Portuguese events. The first edition (editio princeps) was published by Enrique Flórez in 1767. A more recent edition, incorporating the recension known as the Chronicon conimbrigense, was published under the title Annales Portugalenses veteres (APV, "old Portuguese annals") by Pierre David.

== Editions ==
- Enrique Flórez, ed. España Sagrada, XXIII, 2nd ed. (Madrid: 1799), 316–18. (in Latin)
- Pierre David, ed. "Annales Portugalenses Veteres", Revista Portuguesa de Historia 3 (1945): 81–128.
