= Gustav Ratzenhofer =

Gustav Ratzenhofer (July 4, 1842 in Vienna – October 8, 1904 in the Atlantic Ocean) was an Austrian military officer, philosopher and sociologist. He also wrote under the pseudonym Gustav Renehr.

== Life ==
Ratzenhofer was a watchmaker and joined in 1859 by the master watchmaker examination in the Austrian army, in which he made a brilliant career: second lieutenant (1864), member of the General Staff (1872), director of the Army Archives (1878), finally as Feldmarschall - lieutenant president of the Military High Court (1898). In 1901 Ratzenhofer left the army and devoted himself entirely to his private study of philosophy and sociology, where he was strongly influenced by active contacts with Ludwig Gumplowicz.

He died at sea in 1904 on his way home from the St. Louis Congress of Arts and Science.

In 1959, in Vienna, Floridsdorf (21st district) was named the Ratzenhofergasse after him.

== Work ==
Ratzenhofer understood sociology based on Herbert Spencer, Charles Darwin and Auguste Comte as part of a comprehensive philosophy, which he described as "positive monism". He represented an evolutionary model of social development.

Drive all social activity is by Ratzenhofer the "elemental force" (innate interests). "Jealousy" and "blood love" since time immemorial dominate the social events. The primitive society is governed by the "law of absolute hostility". Conflicts and subjugation then change "Peculiar State" to "Culture State" and ends in civilization, in the peaceful reconciliation of interests enables a creative and free life.

Ratzenhofer tried to explain all the laws of human coexistence by scientific methods, and emphasized the unity of Weltgesetzlichkeit. His work is considered an important contribution to the sociological interests and evolutionary theory. Particularly in the US, he was received as one of the founding fathers of policy sociology.

== Writings (selection) ==
- A. Grausgruber: Ratzenhofer, Gustav, in Wilhelm Bernsdorf / Horst bud (eds.): International sociologist Encyclopedia, Vol 1, Enke, Stuttgart 1988, S. 347th
- Dirk Kaesler: Ratzenhofer, Gustav. In: New German Biography (NDB). Volume 21, Duncker & Humblot, Berlin 2003, ISBN 3-428-11202-4, S. 188 f.
- Florian Oberhuber: The "double original essence of State authority". Modern State, sociological authority and political pluralism Gustav Ratzenhofers (1842–1904), in: Sociologia Internationalis, Vol 40, 2002, H. 1, S. 85-115.
- Florian Oberhuber: The problem of politics in the Habsburg monarchy. History of ideas studies to Gustav Ratzenhofer, 1842–1904. Diss. Vienna 2002.
- Florian Oberhuber: From the general cultural history to political science sociologically founded: Gustav Ratzenhofer (1842–1904). In: Karl Acham (Hg.): "History of the Austrian Human Sciences", Vol 6.2, "Philosophy and Religion.. God Is and Ought "Passagen Verlag, Vienna 2006.
- Ch Tepperberg. Ratzenhofer Gustav. In: Austrian Biographical Encyclopaedia 1815–1950 (ÖBL). Volume 8, Austrian Academy of Sciences, Vienna, 1983, ISBN 3-7001-0187-2, S. 434 f.
