= Mesopotamia in Classical literature =

Before the decipherment of cuneiform text, knowledge of the history of the ancient Mesopotamia was mostly dependent upon classical authorities and the Hebrew Bible. These testimonies were scanty and confused for times predating the 7th century BCE. Had the native history of Berossus survived, this may not have been the case; all that is known of the Chaldaean historian's work, however, is derived from quotations in Josephus, Ptolemy, Eusebius, Jerome and George Syncellus.

== Classical Greece ==
The account of Babylon given by Herodotus is not that of an eye-witness and not very extensive. In his Histories he mentions that he will devote a whole section to the history of Assyria, but this promise was unfulfilled, or perhaps the book has been lost. Herodotus' opinions are disputed by Ctesias, who, however, has mistaken mythology for history, and Greek romance owed to him its Ninus and Semiramis, its Ninyas and Sardanapalus. Xenophon's account in the Anabasis gives information on the Achaemenid Empire of his time.

== Hellenistic era ==
=== Berossus ===
The authenticity of his list of 10 antediluvian kings who reigned for 120 sari or 432,000 years, has been partially confirmed by the inscriptions; but his 8 postdiluvian dynasties are difficult to reconcile with the monuments, and the numbers associated with them are probably corrupt. It is different with the 7th and 8th dynasties as given by Ptolemy in the Canon of Kings in his Almagest, which prove to have been recorded faithfully:

1. Nabonassar (747 BC) 14 years
2. Nadios (Nabu-nadin-zeri)
3. Khinziros (Nabu-mukin-zeri) and Poros (Pul)
4. Ilulaeos (Ululayu)
5. Mardokempados (Marduk-apal-iddina II) 12
6. Arkeanos (Sargon II)
7. Interregnum
8. Hagisa 1 month
9. Belibos (702 BC) 3 years (Bel-ibni)
10. Assaranadios (Ashur-nadin-shumi)
11. Regebelos- (Nergal-ushezib) ..year
12. Mesesimordakos (Mushezib-Marduk), 4 years
13. Interregnum
14. Asaridinos (Esarhaddon), 13 years
15. Saosdukhinos (Shamash-shum-ukin), 20 years
16. Sineladanos (Kandalanu), 22 years

== See also ==
- Assyriology
