= Our Enemy, the State =

Lecture series and 1935 book by Albert Jay Nock

- Author: Albert Jay Nock
- Language: English
- Genre: Libertarianism
- Publisher: William Morrow & Company
- Publication date: 1935
- Publication place: United States
- ISBN: 1502585634

Our Enemy, the State is the best-known book by libertarian author Albert Jay Nock, serving as a fundamental influence for the modern libertarian and American conservatism movements. Initially presented as a series of lectures at Bard College, it was published in 1935 and attempts to analyze the origins of American freedom and question the nature and legitimacy of authoritarian government. Nock differentiates between that, which he refers to as "the State" (as described by Franz Oppenheimer in his book The State) and "legitimate" government, including governing oneself or consensual delegation of decision-making to leaders one selects.

== Legacy ==
The book has been cited as an influence by a wide range of conservative and libertarian thinkers and political figures, including Murray Rothbard, Ayn Rand, Barry Goldwater, H.L. Mencken, and L. Neil Smith.

It is seen as a key foundation for the modern American conservatism movement that grew out of reaction to the expanding State of the New Deal. Considering the expansion of The State in the years since, Our Enemy, the State has been cited as increasingly apt over time, among Conservatives.

In arguing that John F. Kennedy was actually conservative, Ira Stoll cited his ownership of Our Enemy, the State, as well as The Man Versus the State, by 19th century leader of the individualist movement, Herbert Spencer.

== Summary ==
Nock argues in the book that something like the modern conservative movement should be formed of what he described as The Remnant, those remaining people who recognize The State as a destructive burden on society.

Nock is not attacking government, per se, but "The State", authority that violates society itself, claiming to rule in the people's name but taking power away from the community. He states that the expansion of the state comes at the expense of social power, shrinking the role of community. Denying that the two are the same, he points out the historic origin of authoritarian government through conquering warlords and robber barons.

Nock argues that the Articles of Confederation that preceded the US Constitution were actually superior to it, that the reasons given for its replacement were excuses by land speculators and creditors looking to enrich themselves.

While he did laud the Founders for establishing a legitimate government, as opposed to state, that was intended to protect natural rights.

The state, according to Nock, "turns every contingency into a resource for accumulating power in itself, always at the expense of social power". People become conditioned to accept their lost freedom and social power as normal, in each subsequent generation, and so the State continues to expand, and society to shrink. He cites Thomas Paine as pointing out that the state "even in its best state, is but a necessary evil; in its worst state, an intolerable one".

He goes on to quote Sigmund Freud as noting that government does not actually show any tendency to suppress crime, but only to protect its own monopoly over it. Along with Paine and Freud, Nock talks about the usurpation of power and resources by The State in the context of Benjamin Franklin, Henry George, and others. In fact, he argues that this seizure is comparable to the gathering of land by the Crown in 1066 England, be it in the Federalization of land in Western states or elsewhere as "needed" for control over the populace.

There are two methods, according to Nock, by which a man's needs and desires can be satisfied. One is the production and exchange of wealth, which he sees as natural, honest, and healthy. The other is by the initiation of force to rob others of it, whether by conquest, confiscation, slavery, or other coercive means. The former he sees as freedom, the latter as the inevitable function of the state.

Like Lysander Spooner in No Treason: The Constitution of No Authority, Nock disputes both the legitimacy of an inherited constitution and the other arguments used to justify claiming it legitimately binds its subjects. He attacks the motivations and legitimacy of the Founding Fathers directly, not simply their ability to impose a contract on subsequent generations. The protection of Natural Rights found in the Declaration of Independence, and advocated by Thomas Jefferson and Thomas Paine was abandoned by the largest body of the Founders as the American Revolution ended.

Nock sees The State as expanding radically under FDR, the New Deal merely being a pretext for Federal government to increase its control over society. He was dismayed that the president had gathered unprecedented power in his own hands and called this development an out-and-out coup d'état. Nock criticized those who believed that the new regimentation of the economy was temporary, arguing that it would prove a permanent shift. He believed that the inflationary monetary policy of the Republican administrations of the 1920s was responsible for the onset of the Great Depression and that the New Deal was responsible for perpetuating it.
