= Ludwig Gumplowicz =

Polish sociologist (1838–1909)

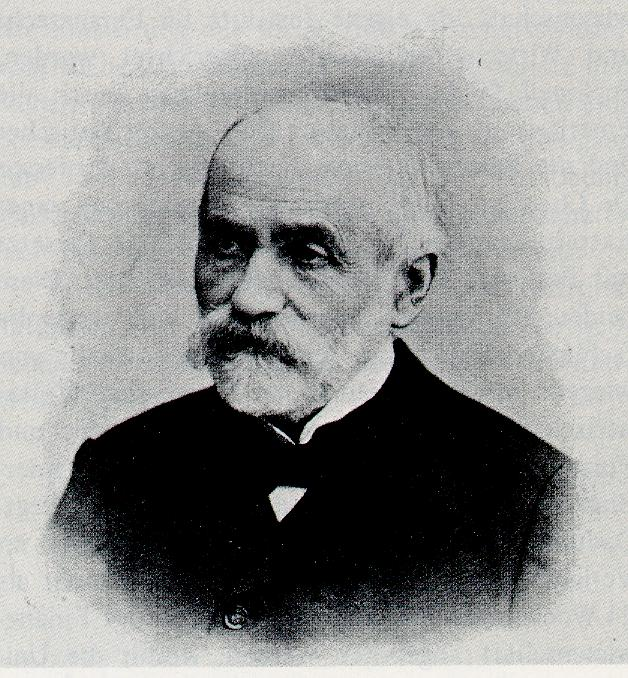
- Born: Ludwik Gumplowicz; 9 March 1838; Republic of Kraków
- Died: 19 August 1909 (aged 71); Graz, Austria
- Education: University of Graz University of Vienna, Austria
- Known for: Social Darwinism; Syngenism; Division of labor

Ludwig Gumplowicz (9 March 1838 – 19 August 1909) was a Polish sociologist, jurist, historian, and political scientist, who taught constitutional and administrative law at the University of Graz.

Gumplowicz was the son of a Jewish carpet and porcelain manufacturer, Abraham Gumplowicz. Gumplowicz is considered to be one of the founding fathers of sociology across German-speaking countries. While living under the Austro-Hungarian monarchy, he witnessed many violent antisemitic conflicts between ethnic groups, which influenced his sociological theories of social conflict and explaining social phenomena later on in life. His contributions to the fields of social science, political science, and jurisprudence allowed these fields to expand under the lens of Gumplowicz's applications of sociological generalizations. In all three areas, he was a straightforward and vivacious writer who excelled in controversy. He was well known for his skepticism of the permanence of social progress and his belief that the state emerges from inevitable confrontation rather than unity or divine inspiration.

== Personal life ==
=== Early life and heritage ===
As a child of a Polish family of Jewish origin, Gumplowicz grew up in a family that was part of a progressive Jewish group that advocated for a comprehensive social assimilation program for all Jews. Before the outbreak of the January Insurrection of 1863, the Gumplowicz family's home was one of the outposts of conspiracy. During the Insurrection, it had become a lodging place for vulnerable youth and a refuge for the wounded. Ludwik's father, Abraham, assisted in the insurgency's planning, and his two older brothers fought alongside him. Ludwig Gumplowicz and his wife both converted to Calvinism to escape prevailing antisemitism.

Judaism was always present for Gumplowicz and his family while growing up. Therefore, the well-being of the Jewish people was essential to him. Even though his father, Abraham Gumplowicz, tried to assimilate into the community of Krakow, Jews were often seen as second-class citizens. This brought Gumplowicz many obstacles that he had to face as a Jew. He wrote several articles in which he attempted to bring attention to the issues of antisemitism and the emancipation of the Jews.

=== Education ===
He then went on to study at the universities of Kraków and Vienna and became a professor of public law at the University of Graz in 1875. He and his wife, Franciska, had two sons. In 1875, Gumplowicz began studying law at the Jagiellonian University in Kraków. He then went to study in Vienna for a year, and then returned to Kraków to receive a doctoral law degree. He culminated in the foundation of the first Sociological Society in Graz. In 1860, he began his journalistic career. From 1869 to 1874 he edited his own magazine the Kraj (the Country). Then, in 1875, at the age of thirty-seven, he entered the University of Graz as a lecturer in the science of administration and Austrian administrative law. In 1882, he became an associate professor, and in 1893 a full professor. Gumplowicz then retired from academia in 1908.

As a Polish intellectual, he felt a sense of imminent doom in his homeland, the strangeness of a foreign world, and then nostalgia for their homeland, and gradually became appreciated in his adopted country, though largely going unnoticed by his own compatriots. By rejecting orthodox jurisprudence in favor of establishing sociology that had yet to be widely accepted in Austria and Germany, he remained an outsider and at odds with university circles after years of studying and teaching his beliefs. He would frequently stress his Polish and Jewish roots, further isolating himself from academic circles.

== Career ==
=== Contributions ===
Ludwig Gumplowicz's first sociological work was Race and State (1875), the title later changed to The Sociological Idea of the State (1881) to finally become General State Law ("Allgemeines Staatsrecht") (1907). His other works include Outlines of Sociology, Austrian State Law, The Race Struggle, Sociological Essays, Sociology and Politics, and others, and have been translated into other foreign languages. Gumplowicz left a huge literary legacy, with 190 works to his name, not to mention the scores of papers and reviews he wrote in Polish.

== Thought ==
=== Sociology of conflict ===
Gumplowicz became interested in the problem of suppressed ethnic groups very early, being from a Jewish family and coming from Kraków, a city of the former Polish–Lithuanian Commonwealth, which was first partitioned and later turned into the quasiautonomous Free City of Kraków annexed by Austria-Hungary. He was a lifelong advocate of minorities in the Habsburg Empire, the Slavic people in particular.

After the republic of Cracow dissolved, the National Polish Independence movement was created, which the young Gumplowicz became a part of. This movement's aim was to have the right to national self-determination granted for of Poles in order to re-establish the independent Poland. Gumplowicz, a young successful lawyer at that time, became committed to the movement. In 1863, he took part in the January Uprising against Russian occupation, and was an active member of the conspiracy. Shortly after the uprising, he published a democratic magazine, Kraj (The Country), from 1869 until 1874.

Gumplowicz soon became interested in the later form of sociology of conflict, starting out from the idea of the group (then known as race). He understood race as a social and cultural, rather than a biological phenomenon. He stressed in every way the immeasurably small role of biological heredity and the decisive role of the social environment in the determination of human behavior. While attaching a positive significance to the mixing of races, he noted that pure races had already ceased to exist.

==== State ====
He saw the state as an institution which served various controlling elites at different times. In analysis, he leaned towards macrosociology, predicting that if the minorities of a state became socially integrated, they would break out in war. In his 1909 publication, Der Rassenkampf (Struggle of the Races), he foresaw a world war. According to Gumplowicz, a state that overlapped in scope with a country and was associated with the nation in people's imagination started to take on the role of a social agent.

Division of labor

In Gumplowicz's view, every state imposes a system of labor division by force; as a consequence, social classes emerge, and conflict rises among the classes. Rather than creating laws based upon fairness, laws are decided by victories in class battles. In the same way that culture is a result of affluence, and leisure is made possible by conquering, higher civilization owes its existence to battles with those of lower classes. Gumplowicz rejected the idea that taking welfare measures or even social planning could preserve civilizations from eventual destruction, taking into account history to be a cyclical process.

==== Social Darwinist ====
During his life, he was considered a Social Darwinist, mainly because of his approach to society as an aggregate of groups struggling ruthlessly for domination among themselves . Nevertheless, he did not deduce his conceptions directly from evolutionary theory and criticized those sociologists who employed biological analogies as an explanatory principle (Comte, Spencer, Lilienfeld). At the same time, he shared the naturalistic conception of history and considered humanity a particle of the universe and nature, a particle governed by the same eternal laws as the whole.

==== Syngenism ====
Gumplowicz was most known for the idea of syngenism. It is a combination of moral, physical, economic, and cultural elements that have been blended in varying amounts across time and among various social groupings. Consanguinity was the primary link in the groupings, but as the world evolves, economic and mental pressures became increasingly significant. Gumplowicz defines syngenism as

That phenomenon which consists in the fact that invariably in associated modes of life, definite groups of men, feeling themselves closely bound together by common interests, endeavor to function as a single element in the struggle for domination.

Human beings, according to Gumplowicz, have an inherent propensity to form communities and create a sense of unity. He called this syngenism (syngenetic). Syngenism is a term used to describe a society with a distinct culture that develops a sense of belonging as a whole, as well as a sense of brotherhood in the sense that they are of the same species.

== Influences ==
His political beliefs and his polemic character attracted many Polish and Italian students, making his theories important in Poland, Italy, and other crown states (today Croatia, Czech Republic). But the fact that he published his works in German meant that he was also an important figure in German-speaking countries. Gustav Ratzenhofer was the most prominent of those influenced by him. Gustav Ratzenhofer was the sociologist which Gumplowicz thought most highly of. Philosophers Carlo Cattaneo, Friedrich Nietzsche, and Gustav Ratenhofer were all men that Ludwig Gumplowicz had shared similar ideas. Although they were all different from one another, they shared the same goals and point of views. Their shared goal was of reevaluating social moral values. These social moral values were seen by society to be permanent and unchangeable. This was what brought these men to their shared aim of studying social norms and groups to help redefine the principles by which people live.

Gumplowicz had another disciple in Manuel González Prada. Prada lived in Peru and found Grumplowicz's theories on ethnic conflict useful for understanding not only the Spanish conquest of Quechua peoples during the sixteenth century but also how the descendants of the Spanish (and other European immigrants) continued to subordinate the indigenous peoples. Most striking in this regard is González Prada’s essay "Our Indians" included in his Horas de lucha after 1924. Brazilian essayist Euclides da Cunha also acknowledges Gumplowicz's influence in the preliminary note to his influential study Os Sertões (1902), an in-depth analysis of the 1896-1898 War of Canudos between Brazil's Republican government and the residents of Canudos in the backlands of Bahia.

=== Referenced work ===
In his publication, The Outlines on Sociology (1899), Gumplowicz reviews the works of Comte, Spencer, Bastian, and Lippert. He also reviews the relations of economics, politics, the comparative study of law, the philosophy of history, and the history of civilization to the science of society.

Sociologists influenced by him were Gustav Ratzenhofer, Albion W. Small, Franz Oppenheimer. The social scientists Émile Durkheim, León Duguit, Harold J. Laski, and others elaborated Gumplowicz's view of political parties as interest groups. Also influenced Erazm Majewski and Mieczyslaw Szerer. His theories were also highly influential among the first conflict theorists and inspired early theoretical work on the governance on multiethnic states.

== Criticism ==
A criticism of Gumplowicz's work is that he presents a rather narrow interpretation of the nature of social phenomena. He placed a large emphasis on social groups as well as the sociological investigation of their conflict as a unit. In doing so, Gumplowicz minimized the importance of the individual and magnified the coercion and determination that is excepted by the group to the individual. This was further than other sociologists, such as Durkheim, Sighele, LeBon, or Trotter went.

Critical authors like Jerzy Szacki have stated that Gumplowicz's influence was undoubtedly aided by the fact that his scholarly work took place outside of the time's major intellectual centers, as well as the fact that his more intriguing theories about his sociological method were more thoroughly developed by other theorists, such as sociologism by Durkheim and conflict theory by Marx.

== Legacy ==
Gumplowicz defined sociology as the science of society and social laws. He devoted his life to the study of relations common to social classes and groups. He was a seeker of truth and went through many obstacles in his journey of studying social events.

He goes on to write the popular quote:

No chemist would ask whether oxygen did well in uniting with hydrogen, or whether it is right in mixing with quicksilver. No astronomer would ask, whether the moon, in appearing between sun and earth is worthy of praise or blame-but no historian could be found who would consider it unjustified to judge about the “right” or “wrong” action of King X or Minister Y; who would refrain from praise or blame in the conception of any action whatever.

== Death ==
On 19 August 1909, Ludwig Gumplowicz and his wife, Franciska, both committed suicide by poison. Gumplowicz was diagnosed with cancer at the end of 1907, and his health was failing, as was Franciska's health. In a letter, he wrote "we are both thinking more of the other side (an's Jenseits denizen), and life is a burden to us." As such, they both ended their life together, ending the pain of Gumplowicz's cancer. Gumplowicz's death was deeply shocking to the world. His influence as a great thinker, writer, philosopher, jurist, historian, and sociologist has changed the course of sociological history. The students of Gumplowicz often referred to him as an angel with a great soul and a magnificent thinker. In his honor, a sociological society was created in the city of Graz after his death. Gumplowicz was highly looked up to by many philosophers and sociologists and they emphasize their appreciation for his journey of seeking the truth and ideas.

== Most famous publications ==
- Race and State (1875)
- Der Rassenkampf (The Race Struggle) (1883)
- System Socyologii (1887), published Polish
- Grundriss Der Sociologie (1899), translated to English as The Outlines of Sociology by Frederick W. Moore and published in 1975 by Arno Press
