= Chronicon Holtzatiae =

1448 Latin universal chronicle

The Chronicon Holtzatiae auctore presbytero Bremensi is a Latin universal chronicle from the year 1448, but concentrating on the County of Holstein (the terra Holsacie) and written by an anonymous presbyter of Bremen originally from Holstein. It has received three modern editions, the first by the philosopher Gottfried Wilhelm Leibniz in 1698. Other than that it has been rather neglected by medievalists; its Latin is poor and its author imaginative.

For the years before 1170 the principal source for the anonymous presbyter is Helmold's Cronica Slavorum. After this date he has no discernible source. He describes himself as a scriba hujus patrie (scribe of this fatherland), probably indicating a low-level position in the comital chancery, then in its earliest stages. An analysis of the Chronicon suggests that he had access to comital documents and that he participated in the 1447 negotiations at Lübeck between Adolf VIII of Holstein-Rendsburg and Duke of Schleswig and the free people of the Dithmarschen, wedged between Holstein and the sea.

The Chronicon pays especially close attention to the west of the county (Dithmarschen, Krempermarsch, and Wilstermarsch), and particularly to Itzehoe. This suggests that the anonymous presbyter may have hailed from the western country, or maintained links with the Cistercian monastery of Saint Lawrence/Our Lady at Itzehoe. The majority of counts of Holstein were buried there and since 1421 their memory was preserved through various memorial masses and other services rendered by the monks. The author of the Chronicon may have been one of the twenty vicars assigned special roles in this regard.

The Chronicon, interpreted in the political context of its compilation, was a propaganda tool for the Schauenburg dynastic line of Holstein-Rendsburg. The house of Schauenburg had ruled Holstein since Adolf I acquired it in 1101. Though six different cadet branches ruled the county divided after 1261, these were all, save the Holstein-Pinneberg, reunited under the Rendsburg branch by 1390. At the time of the Chronicon's compilation Adolf VIII was childless and facing a succession crisis in both Holstein and Schleswig, a fief of the Kingdom of Denmark that was often in dispute between the Holsatian counts and Danish kings. When Christian of Oldenburg, who had married Adolf's sister in 1421, succeeded the Danish throne as Christian I in 1448, the succession problem and the problem of Danish interference in Holstein were suddenly resolved in favour of the Rendsburg interests. The maintenance of the high status of Itzehoe and the denigration of the claims of the counts of Holstein-Pinneburg to the county of Holstein-Rendsburg fuelled the anonymous presbyter of Bremen to compose his chronicle at this time. In the anonymous's own words: ad complementum cronice quam pie recordacionis frater Helmoldus [...] de Holzacorum principibus et vicinis eorum fideliter composuerat ("to complement the chronicle that brother Helmold of pious memory faithfully composed of the princes of Holstein and their neighbours").
