= Robber baron =

Robber baron may refer to:

- Robber baron (feudalism), an unscrupulous medieval landowner
- Robber baron (industrialist), term for unscrupulous 19th-century American businessmen
