= Chronicon (Jerome) =

4th-century work by St. Jerome

The manuscript contains the second part of the Chronicle of Eusebius in the Latin translation and continuation of Jerome.

The Chronicon (Chronicle) or Temporum liber (Book of Times) was a universal chronicle by Jerome written in Constantinople around the year 380. One of the earliest attempts of universal history; this is a Latin translation and expansion of the Greek chronological tables in the second part of the Chronicon of Eusebius, written about 50 years earlier. Despite numerous errors taken from Eusebius, and some of his own, Jerome produced a valuable work of universal history, if only for the example which it gave to such later chroniclers as Prosper of Aquitaine, Cassiodorus, and Victor of Tunnuna to continue his annals. In conformity with the Eusebius, Jerome dated Creation to 5200 BC.

The Chronicle includes a chronology of the events of Greek mythology based on the work of Hellenistic scholars such as Apollodorus, Diodorus Siculus, and Eusebius. While many of the earlier sections contain legendary characters and events that are not necessarily historically factual (the kings of Assyria, for example, are solely based on Greek legends), there may be scattered remnants of historical events of late Mycenean Greece from entries of the 12th century BC (See the historicity of the Iliad; Jerome's date for the capture of Troy of 1183 BC corresponds remarkably well with the destruction layer of Troy VIIa, the main candidate for the historical inspiration of legendary Troy, dated to c. 1190 BC). Homer himself is dated to 940 BC, while modern scholarship usually dates him after 800 BC.

The chronicle contains several regnal lists, including the rulers of Assyria, Egypt, Persia, Greece and Rome. Each year in the table corresponds to a whole calendar year, meaning that years are counted inclusively. Eusebius attempted to synchronize every year with a regnal year; while the specific years do not always match reality, the overall chronology, specially closer to Eusebius' own time, is often accurate. Some of the discrepancies may be explained by the fact that several of the events were originally recorded in different calendars that do not always match perfectly with each other.

== Timeline ==
From Adam until the 14th year and 6th consulate of Valens (AD 378), 5579 years; this places Creation in 5200 BC

From Creation to Abraham, 3184 years
- From Adam to the Flood (2957 BC), 2242 years
- From the Flood to Abraham (2016 BC), 942 years
- From the reign of Ninus (2058 BC) to Abraham, 43 years
- From the reign of Europs (2037 BC), the 2nd ruler of Sicyon, to Abraham, 22 years
- In the times of Abraham, the Sixteenth Dynasty of Egypt ruled for 190 years
From Abraham to the capture of Troy (26 Assyrian kings), 835 years
- Ninus, son of Belus, reigned 52 years; Abraham, Zoroaster
- Semiramis, 42 years
- Zameis, 38 years; covenant of Abraham with God (1942 BC)
- Arius, 30 years; birth of Isaac (1916 BC)
- Aralius, 40 years
- Xerxes Balaneus, 30 years; Inachus of Argos reigned 50 years (1856 BC)
- Armamitres, 38 years; Seventeenth Dynasty of Egypt (1826 BC)
- Belocus, 35 years; birth of Joseph (1765 BC); Ogygian Flood (1757 BC)
- Balaeus, 52 years; Eighteenth Dynasty of Egypt founded by Amosis (1723 BC)
- Altadas, 32 years; Prometheus
- Mamynthus, 30 years
- Magchaleus, 30 years
- Sphaerus, 20 years; birth of Moses (1592 BC)
- Mamylus, 30 years
- Sparetus, 40 years; Deucalian flood (1526 BC)
- Ascatades, 40 years; Moses on Mount Sinai (1515 BC)
- Amynthes, 45 years; birth of Minos, Rhadamanthus, and Sarpedon (1445 BC)
- Belochus, 25 years
- Bellepares, 30 years; Perseus, Nineteenth Dynasty of Egypt (1375 BC)
- Lamprides, 32 years; Tros founds Troy (1365 BC)
- Sosares, 20 years; Pegasus
- Lampares, 30 years; Europa, temple at Eleusis
- Pannias, 45 years; Miletus; Argonauts; Oedipus; Gideon
- Sosarmus, 19 years; Hercules, Priam, Theseus, the war of the Seven against Thebes (1234 BC)
- Mithraeus, 27 years; Hercules creates the Olympic games (1212 BC)
- Tautanes, 32 years; Trojan War (1191–1182 BC), Twentieth Dynasty of Egypt (1182 BC)
From the capture of Troy until the first Olympiad, 406 years.
From Ninus to Sardanapalus: 36 Assyrian kings in 1240 years (2060–820 BC)
From the first Olympiad, to the 14th year of Valens, 1155 years (776 BC–AD 378)
From the founding of Rome to the 14th year of Valens, 1131 years (753 BC–AD 378), 240 years under kings, 464 years under consuls, 427 years under caesars and augusti.
- 1st Olympiad (776 BC), in the times of Jonathan of Israel and Bocchoris of Egypt
- 6th Olympiad; founding of Rome (755 BC), 7th Olympiad: Roman Kingdom (752 BC)
- 8th Olympiad; Assyrian captivity (747 BC)
- 47th Olympiad; Babylonian captivity (591 BC)
- 65th Olympiad; Darius the Great (520 BC)
- 67th Olympiad; Roman Republic (502 BC)
- 111th Olympiad; Alexander the Great (330 BC)
- 181st Olympiad; Julius Caesar (44 BC)
- 194th Olympiad; birth of Jesus (2 BC); he dies in the 202nd Olympiad (AD 31)
- 289th Olympiad; Battle of Adrianople, Emperor Valens is defeated by the Goths (AD 378)

== See also ==
- Ages of Man
- Mesopotamia in Classical literature
- Timeline of Ancient Greece
