= Chronicon (Eusebius) =

Chronological tables by Eusebius, c. 325

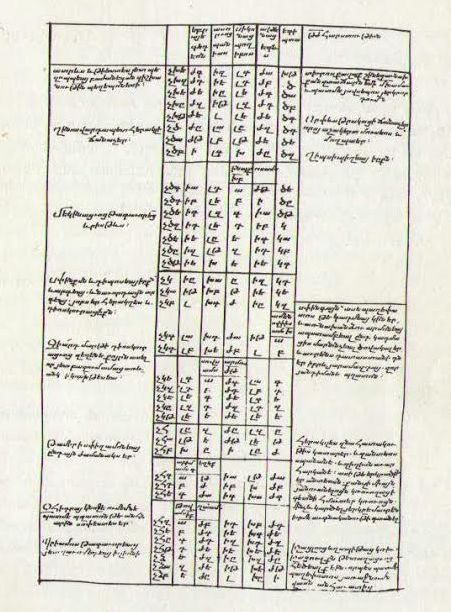
Armenian translation of Eusebius Chronicon, 13th century manuscript

The Chronicon or Chronicle (Greek: Παντοδαπὴ ἱστορία Pantodape historia, "Universal history") was a work in two books by Eusebius of Caesarea. It seems to have been compiled in the early 4th century. It contained a world chronicle from Abraham until the vicennalia of Constantine I in A.D. 325. Book 1 contained sets of extracts from earlier writers; book 2 contained a technically innovative list of dates and events in tabular format.

The original Greek text is lost, although substantial quotations exist in later chronographers. Both books are mostly preserved in an Armenian translation. Book 2 is entirely preserved in the Latin translation by Jerome. Portions also exist in quotation in later Syriac writers such as the fragments by James of Edessa and, following him, Michael the Syrian.

The Chronicle as preserved extends to the year 325, and was written before the "Church History". It exerted considerable influence on later chronicles. Jacob of Edessa's own Chronicon begins where the Chronicon of Eusebius ended, and extends its coverage across the nearly four centuries that separated the two figures.

== Contents ==
The work was composed divided into two parts. The first part (Greek, Chronographia, "Annals") gives a summary of universal history from the sources, arranged according to nations. The second part (Greek, Chronikoi kanones, "Chronological Canons") furnishes a synchronism of the historical material in parallel columns, the equivalent of a parallel timeline, where each line is a year. It is the longest preserved list of Olympic victors, containing however mainly the stadion (running race) winners from 776 B.C. to A.D. 217. These tables have been completely preserved in a Latin translation by Jerome and both parts are still extant in an Armenian translation.

The work may be reconstructed from later chronographers of the Byzantine era, especially George Syncellus.

== See also ==
- Aegyptiaca (Manetho)
- Chronicon (Jerome)
- Mesopotamia in Classical literature
- Onomasticon (Eusebius)
- Universal chronicle

== Sources ==
- Witakowski, Witold (2008). "The Chronicle Of Jacob Of Edessa". In Romeny, Bas Ter Haar (ed.). Jacob of Edessa and the Syriac Culture of His Day. Brill. pp. 25–47.
