= List of heads of state and government who were assassinated or executed =

The following is a chronological list of notable heads of governments and heads of state deaths that have resulted from assassination or execution.

This list considers only the incumbent head of state or government. Heads of state or government assassinated or executed after they left office (e.g. Aldo Moro, Rajiv Gandhi, Saddam Hussein and Shinzo Abe) are excluded.

== List ==
Target	Title	Date	Place	Country	Assassin or other entity	Ref
Rimush	King of Akkad	2270 BC		Akkadian Empire	His courtiers.	
Amenemhat I	Pharaoh of Egypt	1963 BC		Middle Kingdom of Egypt	Unknown, believed to be a conspiracy led by members of the royal family	
Ramesses III	Pharaoh of Egypt	1155 BC		New Kingdom of Egypt	Tiye, Pentawer, and Pebekkamen, among others Further information: Harem conspiracy	
Simbar-shipak	King of Babylon	1008 BC		Babylonia	Ea-mukin-zeri	
Ashur-nadin-apli	King of Babylon	1194 BC		Babylonia	Ashur-nirari III	
Ea-mukin-zeri	King of Babylon	1008 BC		Babylonia	Kashshu-nadin-ahi	
Kashshu-nadin-ahi	King of Babylon	1005 BC		Babylonia	Eulmash-shakin-shumi	
Titus Tatius	King of the Sabines	748 BC	Rome	Roman Kingdom	Romulus	
Ashur-nirari V	King of Assyria	745 BC		Neo-Assyrian Empire	Tiglath-Pileser III	
Nabu-nadin-zeri	King of Babylon	732 BC	Babylon	Babylonia	Killed in an insurrection by Nabu-suma-ukin II.	
Nabu-suma-ukin II	King of Babylon	732 BC	Babylon	Babylonia	Nabu-mukin-zeri	
Nabu-mukin-zeri	King of Babylon	729 BC	Babylon	Babylonia	Killed during the Assyrian conquest of Babylon by Tiglath-Pileser III.	
Shalmaneser V	King of Assyria	722 BC		Neo-Assyrian Empire	Sargon II	
Mushezib-Marduk	King of Babylon	689 BC	Babylon	Neo-Assyrian Empire	Murdered during Sennacherib's sack of Babylon.	
Sennacherib	King of Assyria	681 BC	Nineveh	Neo-Assyrian Empire	Arda-Mulissu	
Lucius Tarquinius Priscus	King of Rome	579 BC	Rome	Roman Kingdom	The sons of Ancus Marcius	
Labashi-Marduk	King of Babylon	556 BC		Neo-Babylonian Empire	Nabonidus and Belshazzar, in concert with the nobles of the court.	
Phalaris	Tyrant of Agrigento	554 BC	Agrigento	Acragas	Telemachus	
Servius Tullius	King of Rome	535 BC	Rome	Roman Kingdom	Lucius Tarquinius Superbus	
Hipparchus	Tyrant of Athens	514 BC	Athens	Athens	Harmodius and Aristogeiton	
Xerxes I	Achaemenid King of Kings	August 465 BC	Persia	Achaemenid Persia	Artabanus, commander of the royal bodyguard	
Xerxes II	Achaemenid King of Kings	424 BC	Persepolis	Achaemenid Persia	Sogdianus, Xerxes' half-brother	
Sogdianus	Achaemenid King of Kings	423 BC	Persepolis	Achaemenid Persia	Darius II, Sogdianus's half-brother	
Dion	Tyrant of Syracuse	354 BC	Syracuse, Sicily	Syracuse	Calippus	
Callippus	Tyrant of Syracuse	352 BC	Syracuse, Sicily	Syracuse	Leptines II	
Philip II	King of Macedon	October 30, 336 BC	Aigai	Macedonia	Pausanias of Orestis (personal bodyguard)	
Arses	Achaemenid King of Kings	336 BC		Achaemenid Persia	Bagoas	
Seleucus I Nicator	Seleucid Basileus	September 281 BC	Lysimachia, Thrace	Seleucid Empire	Ptolemy Ceraunus	
Antiochus II Theos	Seleucid Basileus	July 246 BC	Anatolia	Seleucid Empire	Laodice I	
Lord Chunshen	Prime Minister of Chu	238 BC	Shouchun	Chu	Li Yuan (李園)	
Seleucus III Ceraunus	Seleucid Basileus	June 223 BC	Anatolia	Seleucid Empire	Members of his army	
Nabis	King of Sparta	192 BC	Sparta	Sparta	Aetolian League	
Brihadratha Maurya	Mauryan Emperor	180 BC	Pataliputra	Maurya Empire	Pushyamitra Shunga	
Seleucus IV Philopator	Seleucid Basileus	September 3, 175 BC	Coele-Syria	Seleucid Empire	Heliodorus	
Alexander Balas	Seleucid Basileus	August 145 BC	Afrin River	Seleucid Empire	Zabdiel	
Antiochus VI Dionysus	Seleucid Basileus	142 BC	Coele-Syria	Seleucid Empire	Diodotus Tryphon	
Hiempsal I	King of Numidia	117 BC	Cirta	Numidia	Jugurtha	
Julius Caesar	Dictator of Rome	March 15, 44 BC	Theatre of Pompey, Rome	Roman Republic	Liberatores Further information: Assassination of Julius Caesar	
Caligula	Emperor of Rome	January 24, 41	Rome	Roman Empire	Praetorian Guard	
Claudius	Emperor of Rome	October 13, 54	Rome	Roman Empire	Agrippina the Younger	
Galba	Emperor of Rome	January 15, 69	Rome	Roman Empire	Praetorian Guard under orders from Otho	
Vitellius	Emperor of Rome	December 22, 69	Rome	Roman Empire	Vespasian's troops.	
Domitian	Emperor of Rome	September 18, 96	Rome	Roman Empire	Stephanus, steward to Julia Flavia	
Commodus	Emperor of Rome	December 31, 192	Rome	Roman Empire	Narcissus	
Pertinax	Emperor of Rome	March 28, 193	Rome	Roman Empire	Praetorian Guard	
Didius Julianus	Emperor of Rome	June 1, 193	Rome	Roman Empire	Praetorian Guard	
Geta	Emperor of Rome	December 26, 211	Rome	Roman Empire	Centurions under orders of Caracalla	
Caracalla	Emperor of Rome	April 8, 217	Near Carrhae	Roman Empire	Justin Martialis, at instigation of Macrinus	
Macrinus and Diadumenian	Co-Emperors of Rome	June 218	Cappadocia	Roman Empire	Forces of Elagabalus	
Elagabalus	Emperor of Rome	March 11, 222	Rome	Roman Empire	Praetorian Guard under orders of Julia Maesa and Julia Mamaea	
Severus Alexander	Emperor of Rome	March 19, 235	Mainz, Germania Superior	Roman Empire	Legio XXII Primigenia	
Maximinus Thrax	Emperor of Rome	May 238	Aquileia	Roman Empire	Soldiers of the Legio II Parthica	
Pupienus and Balbinus	Co-Emperors of Rome	July 29, 238	Rome	Roman Empire	Praetorian Guard	
Gordian III	Emperor of Rome	February 20, 244	Circesium	Roman Empire	His own army	
Philip I the Arab	Co-Emperors of Rome	September 249	Verona	Roman Empire	Betrayed by Decius and killed as a result of the Battle of Verona.	
Philip II	Co-Emperors of Rome	September 249	Rome	Roman Empire	Murdered by the Praetorian Guard.	
Volusianus	Co-Emperors of Rome	August 253	Terni	Roman Empire	Assassinated by their own centurions, in favour of Aemilian.	
Trebonianus Gallus	Co-Emperors of Rome	August 253	Terni	Roman Empire	Assassinated by their own centurions, in favour of Aemilian.	
Aemilianus	Emperor of Rome	September 253	Spoleto	Roman Empire	Assassinated by his own troops.	
Saloninus	Emperor of Rome	260	Colonia Claudia Ara Agrippinensium	Roman Empire	Revolting troops, led by Postumus	
Gallienus	Emperor of Rome	September 268	Mediolanum	Roman Empire	Aurelius Heraclianus	
Postumus	Emperor of Gaul	269	Mainz	Gallic Empire	His own troops	
Marcus Aurelius Marius	Emperor of Gaul	Mid 269	Trier	Gallic Empire	Victorinus	
Victorinus	Emperor of Gaul	Early 271	Colonia Claudia Ara Agrippinensium	Gallic Empire	Attitianus, one of his soldiers.	
Aurelian	Emperor of Rome	September 25, 275	Çorlu	Roman Empire	Mucapor and members of the Praetorian Guard	
Florianus	Emperor of Rome	September 276	Tarsus	Roman Empire	Centurions	
Probus	Emperor of Rome	September 282	Sirmium	Roman Empire	His own soldiers	
Numerian	Emperor of Rome	November 20, 284	Homs	Roman Empire	Lucius Flavius Aper	
Carinus	Emperor of Rome	July 285	River Margus, Moesia	Roman Empire	Titus Claudius Aurelius Aristobulus	
Carausius	Emperor of Britannia	293		Britannia	Allectus	
Bunseo	King of Baekje	304	Lelang Commandery	Baekje	Hwang-Chang-Lang	
Constans	Emperor of Rome	February 350	Elne, Gaul	Roman Empire	Magnentius	
Nepotianus	Emperor of Rome	June 30, 350	Rome	Roman Empire	Marcellinus	
Gratian	Emperor of Rome	August 25, 383	Lyon	Roman Empire	Andragathius	
Magnus Maximus	Emperor of Rome	August 28, 388	Aquileia	Roman Empire	Theodosius I	
Victor	Emperor of Rome	August 28, 388	Trier	Roman Empire	Arbogast	
Valentinian II	Emperor of Rome	May 15, 392	Vienne	Roman Empire	Arbogast	
Eugenius	Western Roman Emperor	September 6, 394	Frigidus River	Western Roman Empire	Theodosius I	
Constantine III	Co-Western Roman Emperors	c. September 18, 411	Ravenna	Western Roman Empire	Constantius III	
Constans II	Co-Western Roman Emperors	c. September 18, 411	Vienne	Western Roman Empire	Gerontius	
Joannes	Western Roman Emperor	June 425	Aquileia	Western Roman Empire	Ardabur	
Hassan Yuha'min	King of Himyar	448		Iraq	Sharhabil Yafar	
Valentinian III	Western Roman Emperor	March 16, 455	Rome	Western Roman Empire	Followers of Flavius Aetius	
Ankō	Emperor of Japan	456		Kofun Japan	Mayowa no Ōkimi	
Majorian	Western Roman Emperor	August 7, 461	Tortona	Western Roman Empire	Ricimer	
Libius Severus	Western Roman Emperor	August 15, 465	Rome	Western Roman Empire	Ricimer	
Anthemius	Western Roman Emperor	July 11, 472	Rome	Western Roman Empire	Ricimer	
Julius Nepos	Western Roman Emperor	June 22, 480	Salona	Western Roman Empire	Two retainers at the instigation of Glycerius	
Odoacer	King of Italy	March 15, 493	Ravenna	Kingdom of Italy	Theodoric	
Dhu Shanatir	King of Himyar	517	Zafar	Himyarite Kingdom	Dhu Nuwas	
Bahram Chobin	Sasanian Shahanshah	591	Fergana	Western Turkic Khaganate	Murdered under order of Khosrow II.	
Sushun	Emperor of Japan	592		Asuka Japan	Yamato no Aya no Ataikoma, under the orders of Soga no Umako	
Maurice	Emperor of the Romans	November 22, 602	Chalcedon	Byzantine Empire	Overthrown and Executed by Phocas	
Phocas	Emperor of the Romans	October 4, 610	Constantinople	Byzantine Empire	Overthrown and executed by Heraclius	
Emperor Yang of Sui	Emperor of China	April 11, 618	Danyang, Jiangsu	Sui China	Yuwen Huaji and other officials in a coup d'état	
Umar	Caliph of the Rashidun Caliphate	November 3, 644	Medina, Arabia	Rashidun Caliphate	Abu Lulu	
Uthman	Caliph of the Rashidun Caliphate	June 17, 656	Medina, Arabia	Rashidun Caliphate	Egyptian rebels	
Ali ibn Abi Talib	Caliph of the Rashidun Caliphate	January 29, 661	Kufa	Rashidun Caliphate	Abd-al-Rahman ibn Muljam	
Constans II	Emperor of the Romans	September 15, 668	Syracuse	Byzantine Empire	By an attendant while in the bath	
Tiberios III Apsimar	Emperor of the Romans	February 706	Constantinople	Byzantine Empire	Executed by Justinian II	
Justinian II	Emperor of the Romans	December 711	Constantinople	Byzantine Empire	Overthrown and executed in a military revolt led by Phillipikos	
Leo V "The Armenian"	Emperor of the Romans	December 24, 820	Constantinople	Byzantine Empire	Assassinated as part of a conspiracy in support of the imprisoned Michael the Amorian	
Michael III	Emperor of the Romans	September 23, 867	Constantinople	Byzantine Empire	Basil the Macedonian	
John VIII	Pope	December 16, 882	Rome	Papal States	Clerics	
Emperor Zhaozong of Tang	Emperor of China	September 22, 904	Luoyang	Tang dynasty	Zhu Wen	
Wenceslaus I	Duke of Bohemia	September 28, 935	Brandýs nad Labem-Stará Boleslav	Duchy of Bohemia	Boleslaus I	
Edmund I	King of the English	May 26, 946	Pucklechurch	England	Leofa, a convicted outlaw	
Nikephoros II Phokas	Emperor of the Romans	December 11, 969	Constantinople	Byzantine Empire	John I Tzimiskes	
Edward the Martyr	King of the English	March 18, 978	Corfe Castle, Corfe Castle (village)	England	Ælfthryth	
Kenneth II	King of Alba	995	Fettercairn	Scotland	Finella	
Brian Boru	High King of Ireland	April 23, 1014	Clontarf, Dublin	Ireland	Brodir and Ospak of Man	
Boniface III	Margrave of Tuscany	May 6, 1052	Oglio	March of Tuscany	Scarpetta Carnevari	
Alp Arslan	Sultan of the Seljuk Empire	November 25, 1072	Khwarazm	Seljuk Empire	Yussuf al-Kharezmi	
Nizam al-Mulk	Vizier of the Seljuk Empire	October 14, 1092	Nahavand	Seljuk Empire	Order of Assassins	
Thoros	Lord of Edessa	March 9, 1098		Edessa	Mob incited by Baldwin of Boulogne	
Conrad	Bishop of Utrecht	April 14, 1099	Utrecht	Utrecht	A Frisian	
William II	King of England	August 2, 1100	The New Forest	England	Walter Tirel	
Al-Afdal Shahanshah	Vizier of the Fatimid Caliphate	December 11, 1121		Fatimid Caliphate	Team of three rafiqs from the Order of Assassins	
Charles I	Count of Flanders	March 2, 1127	Bruges	Flanders	A group of knights answering to the Erembald family	
Al-Amir bi-Ahkam Allah	Caliph of the Fatimid Caliphate	October 7, 1130	Cairo	Fatimid Caliphate	team of 7 rafiqs from the Order of Assassins	
Al-Mustarshid	Caliph of the Abbasid Caliphate	August 29, 1135	Maragheh or Hamadan	Abbasid Caliphate	team of rafiqs from the Order of Assassins	
Harald Gille	King of Norway	December 14, 1136	Bergen	Norway	Sigurd Slembe	
Eric II	King of Denmark	September 18, 1137	Urnohoved	Denmark	Murdered by Sorte Plov during a Ting	
Al-Rashid	Caliph of the Abbasid Caliphate	June 6, 1138	Mosul or Isfahan	Abbasid Caliphate	a team of men in his service (Order of Assassins)	
Imad al-Din Zengi	Emir of the Zengid dynasty	September 14, 1146	Qal'at Ja'bar	Seljuk Empire	Yarankash	
Raymond II	Count of Tripoli	1152	Tripoli's southern city gate	County of Tripoli	Order of Assassins	
Sverker I	King of Sweden	December 25, 1156	Alvastra	Sweden	A trusted servant	
Canute V	Triarchial King of Denmark	August 9, 1157	Roskilde	Denmark	Killed under the Roskilde Bloodbath	
Eric IX	King of Sweden	May 18, 1160	Uppsala	Sweden	Magnus II	
Charles VII	King of Sweden	April 12, 1167	Visingsö	Sweden	Supporters of Knut Eriksson	
Alaungsithu	King of Pagan	1167	Shwegugyi Temple	Pagan Kingdom	His son Narathu	
Andronikos I Komnenos	Emperor of the Romans	September 11, 1185	Constantinople	Byzantine Empire	Lynched by a popular uprising instigated by Isaac Angelos	
Conchobar Maenmaige Ua Conchobair	King of Connacht	1189	Clanconway	Kingdom of Connacht	Assassins instigated by Conchobar ua nDiarmata	
Conrad of Montferrat	de facto King of Jerusalem	April 28, 1192	Acre, en route to his house	Kingdom of Jerusalem	Order of Assassins	
Ivan Asen I	Tsar of Bulgaria	1196	Tarnovo	Bulgarian Empire	Ivanko	
Peter II	Tsar of Bulgaria	1197	Preslav	Bulgarian Empire	Unknown, possibly in a riot or as the result of a conspiracy.	
Alexios IV Angelos	Emperor of the Romans	February 8, 1204	Constantinople	Byzantine Empire	Deposed and executed by Alexios Doukas	
Alexios V Doukas	Emperor of the Romans	December 1204	Constantinople	Byzantine Empire	Executed by the participants of the Fourth Crusade	
Baldwin I	Emperor of the Romans	1205	Tarnovo	Latin Empire	Kaloyan, Tsar of Bulgaria	
Boniface of Montferrat	King of Thessalonica and Marquis of Montferrat	September 4, 1207	Thrace	Montferrat & Thessalonica	Murdered by Bulgarian Peasants, believed to be acting on the orders of Kaloyan	
Kaloyan	Tsar of Bulgaria	October 1207	Thessaloniki	Bulgarian Empire	Unknown, believed to be Manastras, the Captain of his mercenaries	
Han Tuozhou	Grand Chancellor of the Song dynasty	1207	Hangzhou	Song dynasty	Shi Miyuan	
Philip of Swabia	King of Germany	June 21, 1208	Bamberg, Franconia	Kingdom of Germany	Otto VIII, Count Palatine of Bavaria	
Csépán Győr	Palatine of Hungary	1209		Hungary	Tiba Tomaj	
Minamoto no Sanetomo	Shōgun	February 13, 1219	Tsurugaoka Hachimangū	Kamakura shogunate	Kugyō	
Eric IV	King of Denmark	August 10, 1250	Gottorf Castle	Denmark	Abel of Denmark	
Michael II Asen	Tsar of Bulgaria	1256	Tarnovo	Bulgarian Empire	Kaliman II Asen	
Kaliman II Asen	Tsar of Bulgaria	1256	Tarnovo	Bulgarian Empire	His co-conspirators from the assassination of Michael II	
Qutuz	Sultan of Egypt	October 24, 1260	El Salheya	Mamluk Sultanate	Baibars	
Eric V	King of Denmark	November 22, 1286	Finderup, Viborg	Denmark	Unknown, believed to be a conspiracy by Danish nobles	
Ladislaus IV	King of Hungary	July 10, 1290	Körösszeg	Hungary	Three Cumans, named Árbóc, Törtel, and Kemence	
Przemysł II	King of Poland	February 8, 1296	Rogoźno	Kingdom of Poland	Brandenburg assassins	
Floris V	Count of Holland	June 27, 1296	Muiderberg	Holland	Gerard van Velsen	
Chaka	Tsar of Bulgaria	1300	Tarnovo	Bulgarian Empire	Theodore Svetoslav	
Wenceslaus III	King of Bohemia	August 4, 1306	Olomouc	Bohemia	Unidentified assassin	
Albert I	King of Germany	May 1, 1308	Windisch	Further Austria	John Parricida	
Gegeen Khan	Emperor of the Yuan dynasty	September 4, 1323	Nanpo	Yuan dynasty	Tegshi	
Yagi Basti	Ruler of Shiraz	1344	Tabriz	Chobanid realm	Malek Ashraf	
Haidar Qassāb	Head of the Sarbadars	1356		Sarbadar state	By a Turkish slave	
Peter the Cruel	King of Castile	March 23, 1369	Montiel	Toledo	Henry II	
Murad I	Sultan of The Ottoman Empire	June 28, 1389	Kosovo Field	Serbian Empire ( Branković)	Lazar Hrebeljanović	
Louis I	Duke of Orléans	November 23, 1407	Le Marais	Orléans	15 masked assassins under the orders of John the Fearless	
Gian Maria Visconti	Duke of Milan	May 16, 1412	Milan	Milan	Milanese nobles	
John the Fearless	Duke of Burgundy	September 10, 1419	Montereau-Fault-Yonne	Burgundy	Tanneguy du Chastel	
Abu Said	Ruler of Qara Qoyunlu	1430	Qara Qoyunlu	Qara Qoyunlu	Iskandar	
Iskandar	Ruler of Qara Qoyunlu	1436	Alinja Tower	Qara Qoyunlu	Jahan Shah	
Ashikaga Yoshinori	Shōgun	July 12, 1441	Muromachi Japan	Ashikaga shogunate	Akamatsu Mitsusuke	
Hasan Ali	Ruler of Qara Qoyunlu	1468	Hamadan	Qara Qoyunlu	Ughurlu Muhammad	
Mirza Yusuf	Ruler of Qara Qoyunlu	October 22, 1469	Shiraz	Qara Qoyunlu	Ughurlu Muhammad	
Henry VI	King of England	May 21, 1471	Tower of London	England	Edward IV	
Giuliano de' Medici	Lord of Florence	April 26, 1478	Florence Cathedral	Florence	Francesco de' Pazzi	
James III	King of Scotland	June 11, 1488	Sauchieburn	Scotland	Rebels, led by James IV Further information: Battle of Sauchieburn	
Takalaua	King of Tuʻi Tonga	Late 15th century		Tu'i Tonga Empire		
Ahmad Shah of Malacca	Sultan of Malacca	1513	Riau Islands	Malacca Sultanate	Mahmud Shah of Malacca	
Alessandro de' Medici	Duke of Florence	January 6, 1537	Florence	Florence	Lorenzino de' Medici	
Francisco Pizarro	Governor of New Castile	June 26, 1541	Lima	Spanish New Castile	Diego de Almagro II	
Manco Inca Yupanqui	Sapa Inca	1544	Vitcos		Supporters of Diego de Almagro II	
Worawongsathirat	King of Siam	November 11, 1548	Lopburi	Ayutthaya Kingdom	Maha Thammaracha	
Tabinshwehti	King of Burma	April 30, 1550	Pantanaw	Toungoo dynasty	Smim Sawhtut	
Ashikaga Yoshiteru	Shōgun	June 17, 1565	Nijō Castle	Ashikaga shogunate	Miyoshi Yoshitsugu	
James Stewart, 1st Earl of Moray	Regent of Scotland	January 23, 1570	Linlithgow	Kingdom of Scotland	James Hamilton of Bothwellhaugh	
Sokollu Mehmed Pasha	Grand Vizier of the Ottoman Empire	October 11, 1579	Istanbul	Ottoman Empire	Order of Assassins	
William the Silent	Stadtholder of Holland, Zeeland, Utrecht and Friesland	July 10, 1584	Delft	Dutch Republic	Balthasar Gérard	
Henry III	King of France	August 1, 1589	Saint-Cloud	France	Jacques Clément	
Michael the Brave	Prince of Wallachia	August 9, 1601	Turda	Wallachia	Giorgio Basta	
Abu'l-Fazl ibn Mubarak	Grand Vizier of the Mughal Empire	August 12, 1602	Deccan	Mughal Empire	Vir Singh Deo	
Henry IV	King of France	May 14, 1610	Paris	France	François Ravaillac	
Concino Concini	Chief minister of France	April 24, 1617	Paris	France	Guards under orders of Louis XIII	
Osman II	Sultan of the Ottoman Empire	May 20, 1622	Yedikule Fortress, Istanbul	Ottoman Empire	Janissaries	
Anaukpetlun	King of Burma	July 9, 1628	Bago, Myanmar	Toungoo dynasty	Minyedeippa, his son	
Saru Taqi	Grand Vizier of Safavid Empire	October 11, 1645	Isfahan	Persia	Jani Khan	
Zhu Yujian	Emperor of the Great Ming	October 6, 1646	Fujian	Southern Ming	Qing soldiers	
Charles I	King of England, Scotland and Ireland	January 30, 1649	Whitehall, London	England; Scotland; Ireland	High Court of Justice Further information: Execution of Charles I and List of regicides of Charles I	
Mahmud II of Johor	Sultan of Johor	September 3, 1699	Kota Tinggi, Johor	Johor Sultanate	Megat Sri Rama	
Daniel Parke	Governor of the Leeward Islands	December 7, 1710	Antigua	British Leeward Islands	By an angry mob	
Abdul Aziz Hotak	Emir of Afghanistan	1717	Kandahar	Hotak dynasty	Mahmud Hotak	
Fernando Manuel de Bustillo Bustamante y Rueda	Governor-General of the Philippines	October 11, 1719	Palacio del Gobernador, Manila	Spanish Philippines	Francisco de la Cuesta	
Mahmud Hotak	Emir of Afghanistan	April 22, 1725	Isfahan	Hotak dynasty	Ashraf Hotak	
Nader Shah	Shahanshah of Iran	June 20, 1747	Quchan	Persia	Salah Bey	
Ebrahim Afshar	Shahanshah of Iran	September 24, 1748	Afsharid Iran	Afsharid Iran	His troops	
Peter III	Emperor of Russia	July 17, 1762	Ropsha	Russian Empire	Alexei Grigoryevich Orlov	
Zaki Khan Zand	Shahanshah of Iran	June 6, 1779	Izadkhast	Zand dynasty	Rebellious tribal leaders	
Jafar Khan	Shahanshah of Iran	January 23, 1789	Arg of Karim Khan	Zand dynasty	Sayed Morad Khan	
Sayed Morad Khan	Shahanshah of Iran	May 10, 1789	Shiraz	Zand dynasty	Lotf Ali Khan	
Gustav III	King of Sweden	March 16, 1792 (d. March 29, 1792)	Stockholm	Sweden	Jacob Johan Anckarström	
Agha Mohammad Khan Qajar	Shahanshah of Iran	June 17, 1797	Shusha	Qajar Empire	A Georgian servant named Sadeq and a valet called Khodadad-e Esfahani, both of whom were due to be executed	
Paul I	Emperor of Russia	March 23, 1801	St. Petersburg	Russia	Peter Ludwig von der Pahlen, Nikita Petrovich Panin, José de Ribas, Vladimir Mikhailovich Yashvil and Nikolay Zubov	
Kirtiman Singh Basnyat	Mulkaji of Nepal	September 28, 1801	Kathmandu	Kingdom of Nepal	Supporters of Raj Rajeshwari Devi	
Jean-Jacques Dessalines	Emperor of Haiti	October 17, 1806	Pont Larnage (now Pont Rouge), near Port-au-Prince	Haiti	Disaffected members of his own administration, including Alexandre Pétion and Henri Christophe	
Spencer Perceval	Prime Minister of the United Kingdom	May 11, 1812	Westminster	United Kingdom	John Bellingham Further information: Assassination of Spencer Perceval	
Shaka	King of the Zulus	September 22, 1828	KwaDukuza	Zulu Kingdom	Dingane and Mhlangana, Shaka's younger brothers	
Pedro Blanco Soto	President of Bolivia	January 1, 1829	Sucre	Bolivia	Factions of the Armed Forces of Bolivia	
Ioannis Kapodistrias	Governor of the Hellenic State	October 9, 1831	Nafplion	Greece	Konstantis and Georgios Mavromichalis	
Felipe Santiago Salaverry	President of Peru	February 18, 1836	Arequipa	Peru	Andrés de Santa Cruz	
Mathabarsingh Thapa	Prime Minister of Nepal	May 17, 1845	Kathmandu	Kingdom of Nepal	Jung Bahadur Kunwar and his brothers	
Fateh Jung Shah	Prime Minister of Nepal	September 14, 1846	Hanuman Dhoka	Kingdom of Nepal	Jung Bahadur Kunwar and his brothers	
João Maria Ferreira do Amaral	Governor of Macau	August 22, 1849	Macau	Portuguese Macau	Shen Zhiliang and six other Chinese men	
Charles III	Duke of Parma	March 26, 1854	Parma	Parma	Unknown	
Danilo I	Prince of Montenegro	August 13, 1860	Kotor	Montenegro	Todor Kadić	
José Santos Guardiola	President of Honduras	January 11, 1862	Comayagua	Honduras	His personal body guard	
Barbu Catargiu	Prime Minister of Romania	June 20, 1862	Bucharest	Romania	Unknown	
Radama II	King of Madagascar	May 12, 1863	Rova of Antananarivo	Merina Kingdom	Soldiers under orders of Rainivoninahitriniony	
Abraham Lincoln	President of the United States	April 14, 1865 (d. April 15, 1865)	Washington, D.C.	United States	John Wilkes Booth Further information: Assassination of Abraham Lincoln	
Venancio Flores	President of Uruguay	February 19, 1868	Montevideo	Uruguay	Unknown assailants, presumably of Blanco political faction	
Mihailo Obrenović	Prince of Serbia	June 10, 1868	Belgrade	Serbia	Pavle Radovanović, Kosta Radovanović	
Juan Prim	Prime Minister of Spain	December 30, 1870	Madrid	Spain	Unknown	
Richard Bourke	Governor-General of India	February 8, 1872	Port Blair	British India	Sher Ali Afridi	
Tomás Gutiérrez	President	July 26, 1872	Lima	Peru	Violent crowd headed by brothers Baltazar and José La Torre Further information: Gutiérrez Brothers' rebellion	
Gabriel García Moreno	President of Ecuador	August 6, 1875	Quito	Ecuador	Faustino Rayo	
Juan Bautista Gill	President of Paraguay	April 12, 1877	Asunción	Paraguay	Nicanor Silvano Godoi	
Alexander II	Emperor of Russia	March 13, 1881	St. Petersburg	Russia	Narodnaya Volya Further information: Assassination of Alexander II of Russia	
James A. Garfield	President of the United States	July 2, 1881 (d. September 19, 1881)	Washington, D.C.	United States	Charles J. Guiteau Further information: Assassination of James A. Garfield	
Ranodip Singh Kunwar	Prime Minister of Nepal	November 22, 1885	Kathmandu	Kingdom of Nepal	Khadga Shumsher, Chandra Shumsher, and Dambar Shumsher	
Sadi Carnot	President of France	June 24, 1894	Lyon	France	Sante Geronimo Caserio Further information: Assassination of Sadi Carnot	
Naser al-Din Shah Qajar	Shah of Iran	May 1, 1896	Tehran	Iran	Mirza Reza Kermani	
Antonio Cánovas del Castillo	Prime Minister of Spain	August 8, 1897	Mondragón	Spain	Michele Angiolillo Further information: Assassination of Antonio Cánovas del Castillo	
Juan Idiarte Borda	President of Uruguay	August 25, 1897	Montevideo	Uruguay	Avelino Arredondo	
José María Reina Barrios	President of Guatemala	February 8, 1898	Ciudad de Guatemala	Guatemala	Edgar Zollinger	
Ulises Heureaux	President of the Dominican Republic	July 26, 1899	Moca	Dominican Republic	Ramón Cáceres	
Umberto I	King of Italy	July 29, 1900	Monza	Italy	Gaetano Bresci	
William McKinley	President of the United States	September 6, 1901 (d. September 14, 1901)	Buffalo, New York	United States	Leon Czolgosz Further information: Assassination of William McKinley	
Alexander I	King of Serbia	June 11, 1903	Belgrade	Serbia	Royal Serbian Army Further information: May Overthrow	
Dimitrije Cincar-Marković	Prime Minister of Serbia	June 11, 1903	Belgrade	Serbia	Royal Serbian Army Further information: May Overthrow	
Nikolay Bobrikov	Governor-General of Finland	June 16, 1904	Helsinki	Grand Duchy of Finland	Eugen Schauman Further information: Assassination of Nikolay Bobrikov	
Xavier Coppolani	Governor of Mauritania	May 12, 1905	Adrar	French Mauritania	Gudfiyya brotherhood	
Abdulaziz bin Mutaib Al Rashid	Emir of Jabal Shammar	December 27, 1906	Al-Ahaimar	Emirate of Jabal Shammar	Sultan bin Hamoud Al Rashid	
Dimitar Petkov	Prime Minister of Bulgaria	March 11, 1907	Sofia	Bulgaria	Aleksandar Petrov	
Mirza Ali Asghar Khan Amin al-Soltan	Prime Minister of Iran	August 31, 1907	Tehran	Iran	Abbas Aqa Tabrizi (fa)	
Carlos I	King of Portugal	February 1, 1908	Lisbon	Portugal	Alfredo Luís da Costa and Manuel Buíça Further information: Lisbon Regicide	
Guangxu Emperor	Emperor of China	November 14, 1908	Imperial City, Beijing	Qing China	Unknown	
Boutros Ghali	Prime Minister of Egypt	February 21, 1910	Cairo	Egypt	Ibrahim Nassif al-Wardani, a Watani Party member	
Pyotr Stolypin	Prime Minister of Russia	September 18, 1911	Kiev	Russian Empire	Dmitry Bogrov	
Ramón Cáceres	President of the Dominican Republic	November 19, 1911	Santo Domingo	Dominican Republic	Rebels led by General Luis Tejera	
José Canalejas y Méndez	Prime Minister of Spain	November 12, 1912	Madrid	Spain	Manuel Pardiñas	
Manuel Enrique Araujo	President of El Salvador	February 9, 1913	San Salvador	El Salvador	Fernando Carmona, Mulatilo Virgilio, Fermin Perez and Fabian Graciano	
Francisco I. Madero	President of Mexico	February 22, 1913	Mexico City	Mexico	Francisco Cárdenas Further information: Ten Tragic Days	
George I	King of Greece	March 18, 1913	Thessaloniki	Greece	Alexandros Schinas Further information: Assassination of George I of Greece	
Mahmud Shevket Pasha	Grand Vizier of the Ottoman Empire	June 11, 1913	Istanbul	Ottoman Empire	Relative of Nazım Pasha	
Vilbrun Guillaume Sam	President of Haiti	July 27, 1915	Port-au-Prince	Haiti	Rebels	
Karl von Stürgkh	Minister-President of Cisleithania	October 21, 1916	Vienna	Austria-Hungary	Friedrich Adler	
Sidónio Pais	President of Portugal	December 14, 1918	Lisbon	Portugal	José Júlio da Costa Further information: Assassination of Sidónio Pais	
Habibullah Khan	Emir of Afghanistan	February 20, 1919	Laghman	Afghanistan	Shuja-ud-Daula Ghourbandi	
Alexander Kolchak	Supreme Ruler of Russia	February 7, 1920	Irkutsk	Russia	Bolsheviks	
Saud bin Abdulaziz Al Rashid	Emir of Jabal Shammar	March 1920	Ḥa'il Province	Emirate of Jabal Shammar	Abdullah bin Talal Al Rashid	
Venustiano Carranza	President of Mexico	May 21, 1920	Tlaxcalantongo	Mexico	Rodolfo Herrero	
Eduardo Dato	Prime Minister of Spain	March 8, 1921	Madrid	Spain	Lluís Nicolau, Pere Mateu, Ramon Casanelles	
António Granjo	Prime Minister of Portugal	October 19, 1921	Lisbon	Portugal	Factions of the Portuguese Armed Forces and National Republican Guard Further information: Bloody Night (Lisbon, 1921)	
Hara Takashi	Prime Minister of Japan	November 4, 1921	Tokyo	Japan	Nakaoka Kon'ichi	
Michael Collins	Chairman of the Provisional Government	August 22, 1922	Béal na Bláth	Irish Republic	Anti-Treaty IRA	
Gabriel Narutowicz	President of Poland	December 16, 1922	Warsaw	Poland	Eligiusz Niewiadomski Further information: Assassination of Gabriel Narutowicz	
Lee Stack	Governor of Sudan	November 19, 1924	Cairo	Egypt	Egyptian students	
Symon Petliura	President of Ukraine	May 25, 1926	Paris	France	Sholom Schwartzbard	
Zhang Zuolin	President of the Republic of China	June 4, 1928	Shenyang	China	Kwantung Army	
Paul Doumer	President of France	May 7, 1932	Paris	France	Paul Gorguloff	
Inukai Tsuyoshi	Prime Minister of Japan	May 15, 1932	Tokyo	Japan	Imperial Japanese Navy officers Further information: May 15 Incident	
Luis Miguel Sánchez Cerro	President of Peru	April 30, 1933	Lima	Peru	Abelardo de Mendoza Further information: Assassination of Luis Miguel Sánchez Cerro	
Mohammed Nadir Shah	King of Afghanistan	November 8, 1933	Kabul	Afghanistan	Abdul Khaliq Hazara	
Ion G. Duca	Prime Minister of Romania	December 30, 1933	Sinaia	Romania	Nicadori death squad of the Iron Guard	
Engelbert Dollfuss	Chancellor of Austria	July 25, 1934	Vienna	Austria	Austrian Nazis led by Otto Planetta Further information: July Putsch	
Alexander I	King of Yugoslavia	October 9, 1934	Marseille	France	Vlado Chernozemski	
Armand Călinescu	Prime Minister of Romania	September 21, 1939	Bucharest	Romania	Răzbunători death squad of the Iron Guard, with support from Nazi Germany Further information: Assassination of Armand Călinescu	
José Abad Santos	Acting President of the Philippines	May 1, 1942	Malabang	Philippines	Imperial Japanese Army	
Ahmad Maher Pasha	Prime Minister of Egypt	February 24, 1945	Cairo	Egypt	Mahmoud el-Essawy	
Ananda Mahidol	King of Siam	June 9, 1946	Grand Palace, Bangkok	Siam	Unknown	
Gualberto Villarroel	President of Bolivia	July 21, 1946	La Paz	Bolivia	Protestors Further information: 1946 La Paz riots	
Aung San	Premier of Burma	July 19, 1947	Rangoon	British Burma	U Saw	
Yahya Muhammad Hamid ed-Din	Imam of Yemen	February 17, 1948	Sanaa	Mutawakkilite Kingdom of Yemen	Ali Nasser Al-Qardai Further information: Al-Waziri coup	
Mahmoud El Nokrashy Pasha	Prime Minister of Egypt	December 28, 1948	Cairo	Egypt	Abdel Meguid Ahmed Hassan, a member of the Muslim Brotherhood	
Husni al-Za'im	President of Syria	August 14, 1949	Damascus	Syria	Factions of the Syrian Armed Forces Further information: August 1949 Syrian coup d'état	
Muhsin al-Barazi	Prime Minister of Syria	August 14, 1949	Damascus	Syria	Factions of the Syrian Armed Forces Further information: August 1949 Syrian coup d'état	
Duncan Stewart	Governor of Sarawak	December 10, 1949	Sibu	British Sarawak	Rosli Dhobi	
Sami al-Hinnawi	President of Syria	October 31, 1950	Beirut	Lebanon	Hersho al-Barazi, a cousin of Muhsin al-Barazi	
Carlos Delgado Chalbaud	President of Venezuela	November 13, 1950	Caracas	Venezuela	Rafael Simón Urbina and Domingo Urbina	
Haj Ali Razmara	Prime Minister of Iran	March 7, 1951	Tehran	Iran	Fada'iyan-e Islam	
Abdullah I	King of Jordan	July 20, 1951	East Jerusalem	Jerusalem	Mustapha Shukari Usho Further information: Assassination of Abdullah I of Jordan	
Henry Gurney	High Commissioner for Malaya	October 6, 1951	Fraser's Hill	Malaya	Malayan Communist Party Further information: Assassination of Sir Henry Gurney	
Liaquat Ali Khan	Prime Minister of Pakistan	October 16, 1951	Rawalpindi	Pakistan	Saad Akbar Babrak	
José Antonio Remón Cantera	President of Panama	January 2, 1955	Panama City	Panama	Unknown	
Anastasio Somoza García	President of Nicaragua	September 21, 1956	León	Nicaragua	Rigoberto López Pérez	
Carlos Castillo Armas	President of Guatemala	July 26, 1957	Guatemala City	Guatemala	Romeo Vásquez Sánchez	
Faisal II	King of Iraq	June 14, 1958	Baghdad	Arab Federation	Nationalist Officers' Organization Further information: 14 July Revolution	
S. W. R. D. Bandaranaike	Prime Minister of Ceylon	September 26, 1959	Colombo	Ceylon	Talduwe Somarama Further information: Assassination of S. W. R. D. Bandaranaike	
Hazza' Majali	Prime Minister of Jordan	August 29, 1960	Amman	Jordan	Shaker al-Dabbas and Kamal Shamut, under orders of Abdul Hamid al-Sarraj	
Abebe Aregai	Prime Minister of Ethiopia	December 17, 1960	Addis Ababa	Ethiopia	Factions of the Imperial Guard led by Mengistu Neway and Germame Neway Further information: 1960 Ethiopian coup attempt	
Rafael Trujillo	President of the Dominican Republic	May 30, 1961	Ciudad Trujillo	Dominican Republic	Antonio de la Maza, Antonio Imbert Barrera, Amado García Guerrero, Salvador Estrella Sadhalá, Huáscar Tejeda Pimentel, Pedro Livio Cedeño, Roberto Pastoriza, Luis Amiama Tió, Luis Manuel "Tunti" Cáceres, and the brothers Modesto and Juan Tomás Díaz.	
Louis Rwagasore	Prime Minister of Burundi	October 13, 1961	Bujumbura	(Belgium) Ruanda-Urundi	Jean Kageorgis	
Sylvanus Olympio	President of Togo	January 13, 1963	Lomé	Togo	Factions of the Togolese Armed Forces Further information: 1963 Togolese coup d'état	
Abd al-Karim Qasim	Prime Minister of Iraq	February 9, 1963	Baghdad	Iraq	Iraqi Ba'ath Party Further information: Ramadan Revolution	
Ngô Đình Diệm	President of the Republic of Vietnam	November 2, 1963	Saigon	South Vietnam	Nguyễn Văn Nhung Further information: Arrest and assassination of Ngô Đình Diệm	
John F. Kennedy	President of the United States	November 22, 1963	Dallas	United States	Lee Harvey Oswald Further information: Assassination of John F. Kennedy	
Jigme Palden Dorji	Prime Minister of Bhutan	April 6, 1964	Phuntsoling	Bhutan	Royal Bhutan Army	
Hassan Ali Mansur	Prime Minister of Iran	January 27, 1965	Tehran	Iran	Mohammad Bokharaei	
Abubakar Tafawa Balewa	Prime Minister of Nigeria	January 15, 1966	Lagos	Nigeria	Factions of the Nigerian Armed Forces led by Chukwuma Nzeogwu Further information: 1966 Nigerian coup d'état	
Johnson Aguiyi-Ironsi	Head of State of Nigeria	July 29, 1966	Lalupon	Nigeria	Factions of the Nigerian Armed Forces led by Murtala Muhammed Further information: 1966 Nigerian counter-coup	
Hendrik Verwoerd	Prime Minister of South Africa	September 6, 1966	Cape Town	South Africa	Dimitri Tsafendas	
Abdirashid Shermarke	President of Somalia	October 15, 1969	Las Anod	Somalia	His personal bodyguards	
Wasfi Tal	Prime Minister of Jordan	November 28, 1971	Cairo	Egypt	Black September Organization Further information: Assassination of Wasfi Tal	
Abeid Karume	President of Zanzibar	April 7, 1972	Zanzibar City	Zanzibar	Four unnamed gunmen	
Richard Sharples	Governor of Bermuda	March 10, 1973	Hamilton, Bermuda	Bermuda	Erskine Durrant "Buck" Burrows and Larry Tacklyn	
Luis Carrero Blanco	Prime Minister of Spain	December 20, 1973	Madrid	Spain	ETA Further information: Assassination of Luis Carrero Blanco	
Richard Ratsimandrava	President of Madagascar	February 11, 1975	Antananarivo	Madagascar	Republican Security Forces	
Faisal I	King of Saudi Arabia	March 25, 1975	Riyadh	Saudi Arabia	Faisal bin Musaid	
François Tombalbaye	President of Chad	April 13, 1975	N'Djamena	Chad	Factions of the Chadian Armed Forces Further information: 1975 Chadian coup d'état	
Long Boret	Prime Minister of Cambodia	April 17, 1975	Phnom Penh	Khmer Republic	Khmer Rouge	
Sheikh Mujibur Rahman	President of Bangladesh	August 15, 1975	Dhaka	Bangladesh	A faction of Bangladesh Army junior officers Further information: Assassination of Sheikh Mujibur Rahman	
Muhammad Mansur Ali	Prime Minister of Bangladesh	November 3, 1975	Dhaka	Bangladesh	A faction of Bangladesh Army junior officers Further information: Jail Killing	
Murtala Muhammed	Head of State of Nigeria	February 13, 1976	Lagos	Nigeria	Bukar Suka Dimka	
Marien Ngouabi	President of the Republic of Congo	March 18, 1977	Brazzaville	Congo-Brazzaville	Suicide commando	
Ibrahim al-Hamdi	President of North Yemen	October 11, 1977	Sana'a	North Yemen	Saudi Arabia (suspected)	
Mohammed Daoud Khan	President of Afghanistan	April 28, 1978	Kabul	Afghanistan	Khalqist factions of the Afghan Republican Army Further information: Saur Revolution	
Ali Soilih	President of the Comoros	May 29, 1978	Moroni	Comoros	Bob Denard	
Ahmad al-Ghashmi	President of North Yemen	June 24, 1978	Sana'a	North Yemen	Unknown	
Salim Rubai Ali	Chairman of the Presidential Council	June 26, 1978	Aden	South Yemen	Leadership of the Yemeni Socialist Party	
Francisco Mendes	Prime Minister of Guinea-Bissau	July 7, 1978	Bissau	Guinea-Bissau	PAIGC dissidents (suspected)	
Park Chung Hee	President of South Korea	October 26, 1979	Seoul	South Korea	Kim Jae-gyu Further information: Assassination of Park Chung Hee	
Hafizullah Amin	Chairman of the Revolutionary Council	December 27, 1979	Kabul	Afghanistan	Soviet special forces Further information: Operation Storm-333	
William Tolbert	President of Liberia	April 12, 1980	Monrovia	Liberia	Harrison Pennoh Further information: 1980 Liberian coup d'état	
Sultan Ibraimov	Prime Minister of Kyrgyzstan	December 4, 1980	Cholpon Ata	Kirghiz SSR	Unknown	
Ziaur Rahman	President of Bangladesh	May 30, 1981	Chittagong	Bangladesh	A faction of Bangladesh Army officers Further information: Assassination of Ziaur Rahman	
Mohammad-Javad Bahonar	Prime Minister of Iran	August 30, 1981	Tehran	Iran	People's Mujahedin of Iran Further information: 1981 Iranian Prime Minister's office bombing	
Mohammad-Ali Rajai	President of Iran	August 30, 1981	Tehran	Iran	People's Mujahedin of Iran Further information: 1981 Iranian Prime Minister's office bombing	
Anwar Sadat	President of Egypt	October 6, 1981	Cairo	Egypt	Khalid Islambouli Further information: Assassination of Anwar Sadat	
Bachir Gemayel	President-elect of Lebanon	September 14, 1982	Achrafieh, Beirut	Lebanon	Habib Shartouni Further information: Assassination of Bachir Gemayel	
Indira Gandhi	Prime Minister of India	October 31, 1984	New Delhi	India	Satwant Singh and Beant Singh (personal bodyguards) Further information: Assassination of Indira Gandhi	
Haruo Remeliik	President of Palau	June 30, 1985	Koror	Palau	Unknown	
Olof Palme	Prime Minister of Sweden	February 28, 1986	Stockholm	Sweden	Unknown Further information: Assassination of Olof Palme	
Rashid Karami	Prime Minister of Lebanon	June 1, 1987	Beirut	Lebanon	Unknown	
Thomas Sankara	President of Burkina Faso	October 15, 1987	Ouagadougou	Burkina Faso	Soldiers under the command of Gilbert Diendéré Further information: 1987 Burkina Faso coup d'état	
René Moawad	President of Lebanon	November 22, 1989	Beirut	Lebanon	Unknown	
Ahmed Abdallah	President of the Comoros	November 26, 1989	Moroni	Comoros	Unknown	
Samuel Doe	President of Liberia	September 9, 1990	Monrovia	Liberia	Prince Johnson	
Mohamed Boudiaf	President of Algeria	June 29, 1992	Annaba	Algeria	Lambarek Boumaarafi Further information: Assassination of Mohamed Boudiaf	
Ranasinghe Premadasa	President of Sri Lanka	May 1, 1993	Colombo	Sri Lanka	LTTE Further information: Assassination of Ranasinghe Premadasa	
Melchior Ndadaye	President of Burundi	October 21, 1993	Bujumbura	Burundi	Tutsi-dominated Burundi National Defence Force factions Further information: 1993 Burundian coup attempt	
Juvénal Habyarimana	President of Rwanda	April 6, 1994	Kigali	Rwanda	Unknown Further information: Assassination of Juvénal Habyarimana and Cyprien Ntaryamira	
Cyprien Ntaryamira	President of Burundi	April 6, 1994	Kigali	Burundi	Unknown Further information: Assassination of Juvénal Habyarimana and Cyprien Ntaryamira	
Agathe Uwilingiyimana	Prime Minister of Rwanda	April 7, 1994	Kigali	Rwanda	Presidential Guard of the Rwandan Defence Force	
Yitzhak Rabin	Prime Minister of Israel	November 4, 1995	Tel Aviv	Israel	Yigal Amir Further information: Assassination of Yitzhak Rabin	
Dzhokhar Dudayev	President of Ichkeria	April 21, 1996	Gekhi-Czu	Chechnya	Russian Armed Forces	
Ibrahim Baré Maïnassara	President of Niger	April 9, 1999	Niamey	Niger	Mutinous soldiers Further information: 1999 Nigerien coup d'état	
Vazgen Sargsyan	Prime Minister of Armenia	October 27, 1999	Yerevan	Armenia	Nairi Hunanyan Further information: Armenian parliament shooting	
Laurent-Désiré Kabila	President of the Democratic Republic of the Congo	January 16, 2001	Kinshasa	Democratic Republic of the Congo	Rashidi Muzele Further information: Assassination of Laurent-Désiré Kabila	
Birendra	King of Nepal	June 1, 2001	Narayanhiti Palace, Kathmandu	Nepal	Dipendra Further information: Nepalese royal massacre	
Zoran Đinđić	Prime Minister of Serbia	March 12, 2003	Belgrade	Serbia and Montenegro	Zvezdan Jovanović Further information: Assassination of Zoran Đinđić	
João Bernardo Vieira	President of Guinea-Bissau	March 2, 2009	Bissau	Guinea-Bissau	Armed Forces of Guinea-Bissau	
Muammar Gaddafi	Brotherly Leader and Guide of the Revolution	October 20, 2011	Sirte	Libya	National Transitional Council Further information: Death of Muammar Gaddafi	
Saleh Ali al-Sammad	Chairman of the Supreme Political Council (disputed) (Note: Al-Sammad was the chairman of the Supreme Political Council, the Houthi-led government in rebellion against the Republic of Yemen.)	April 19, 2018	Al-Hudaydah Governorate	Yemen	Royal Saudi Air Force	
Alexander Zakharchenko	Head of the Donetsk People's Republic	August 31, 2018	Donetsk	Donetsk People's Republic	Unknown	
Jovenel Moïse	President of Haiti	July 7, 2021	Port-au-Prince	Haiti	Unknown Further information: Assassination of Jovenel Moïse	
Issam al-Da'alis	Prime Minister of the Gaza Strip (disputed)	March 18, 2025	Gaza City	Palestine	Israeli Air Force Further information: March 2025 Israeli attacks on the Gaza Strip	
Ahmed al-Rahawi	Prime Minister of Yemen (disputed) (Note: Al-Rahawi was the prime minister of the Supreme Political Council, the Houthi-led government in rebellion against the Republic of Yemen.)	August 28, 2025	Sanaa	Yemen	Israeli Air Force Further information: 28 August 2025 Israeli attack on Yemen	
Ali Khamenei	Supreme Leader of Iran	February 28, 2026	Tehran	Iran	Israeli Air Force; United States Air Force Further information: Assassination of Ali Khamenei	

== Statistics ==
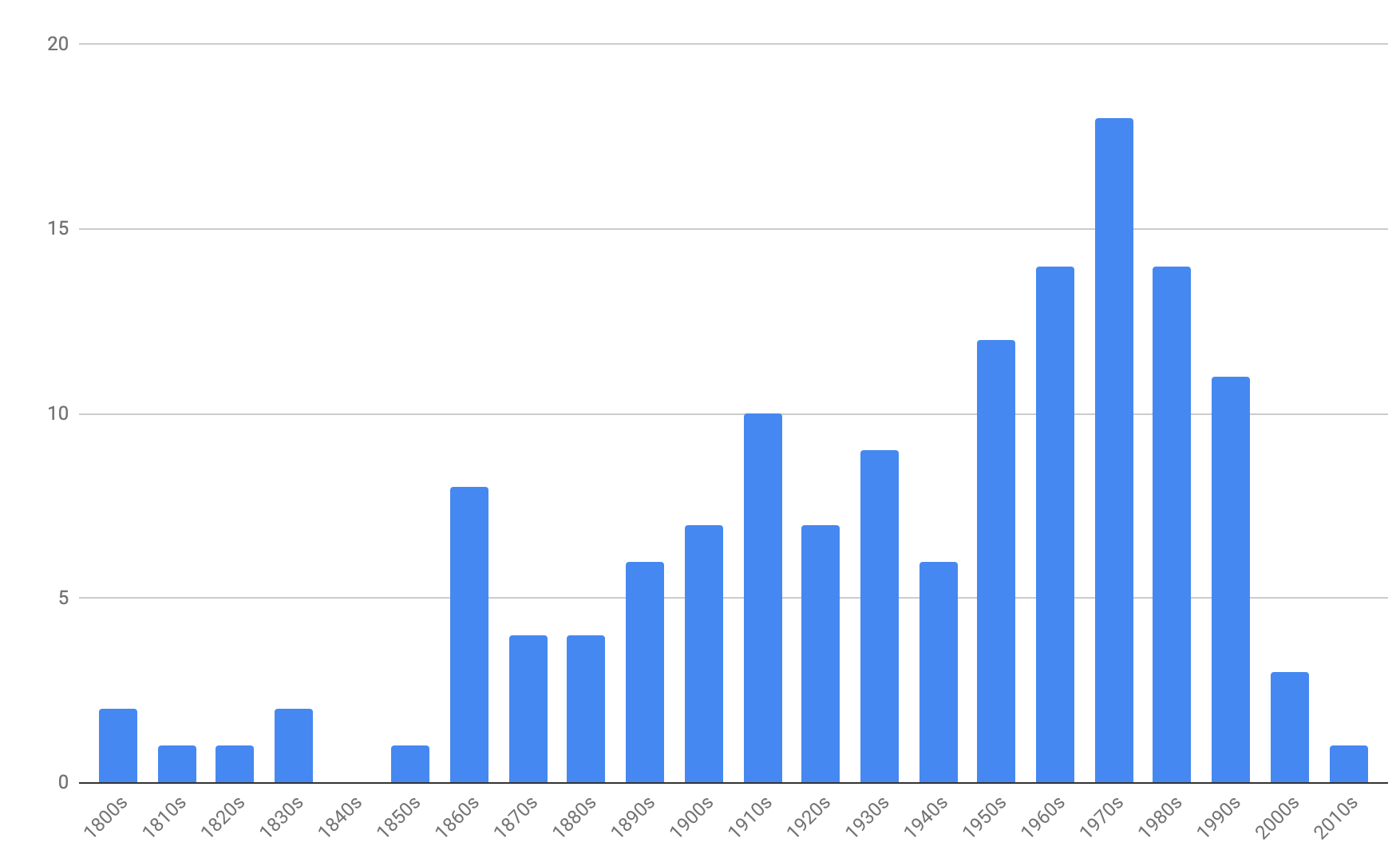

== Gallery ==
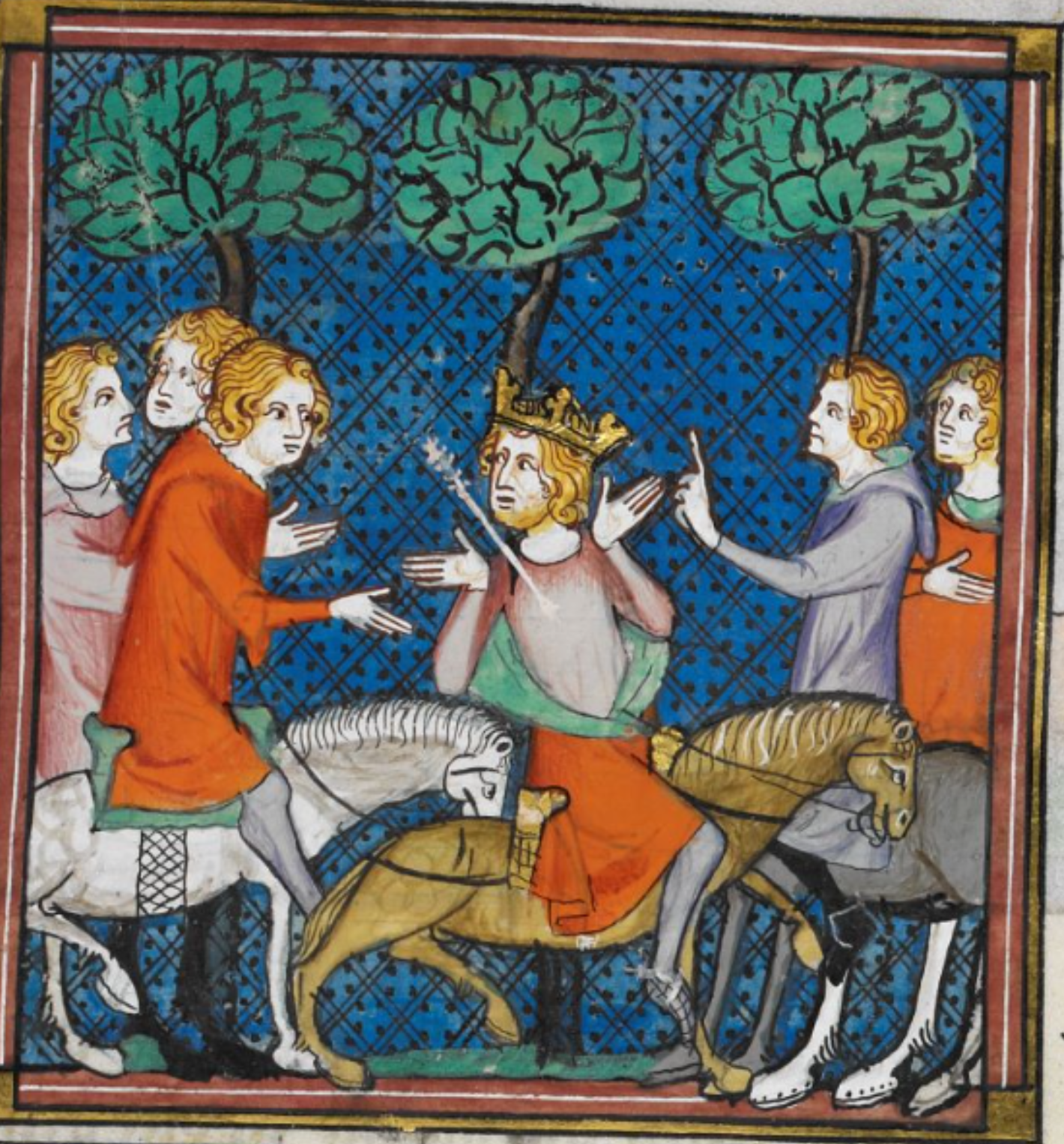
Assassination of William II on 2 August 1100, New Forest, England

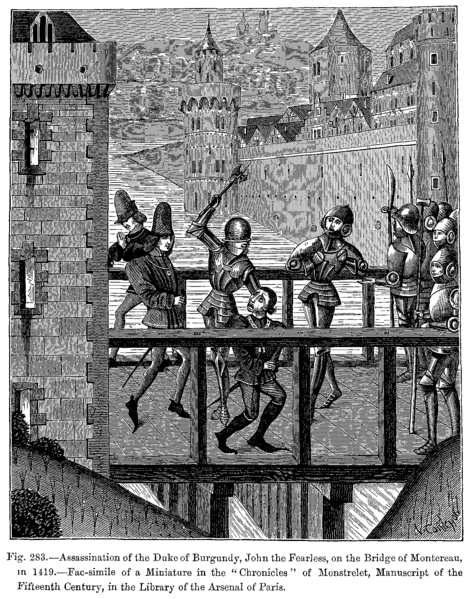
Assassination of John the Fearless on 10 September 1419, Montereau, France

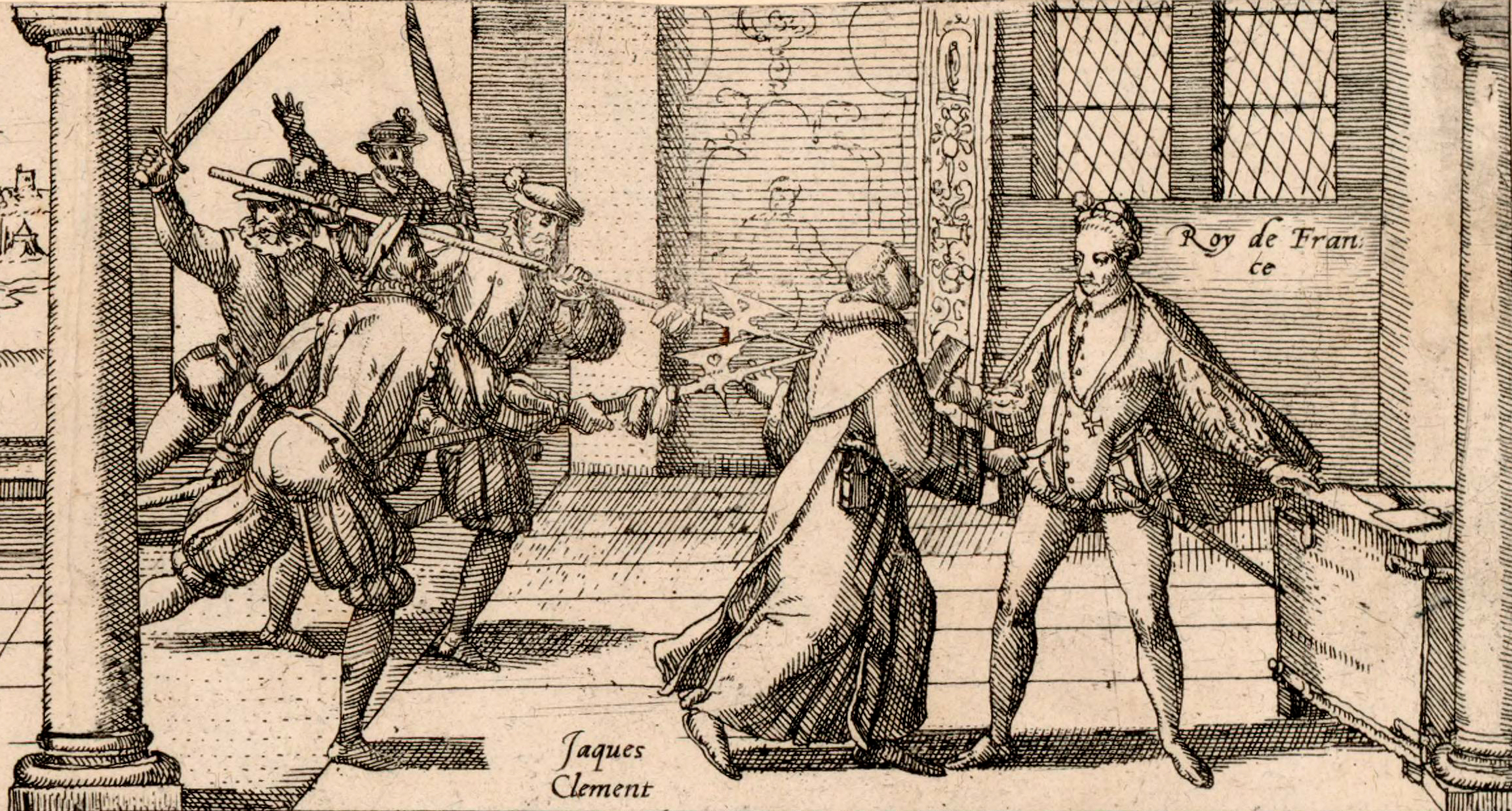
Assassination of Henry III on 2 August 1589, Château de Saint-Cloud, Saint-Cloud, France

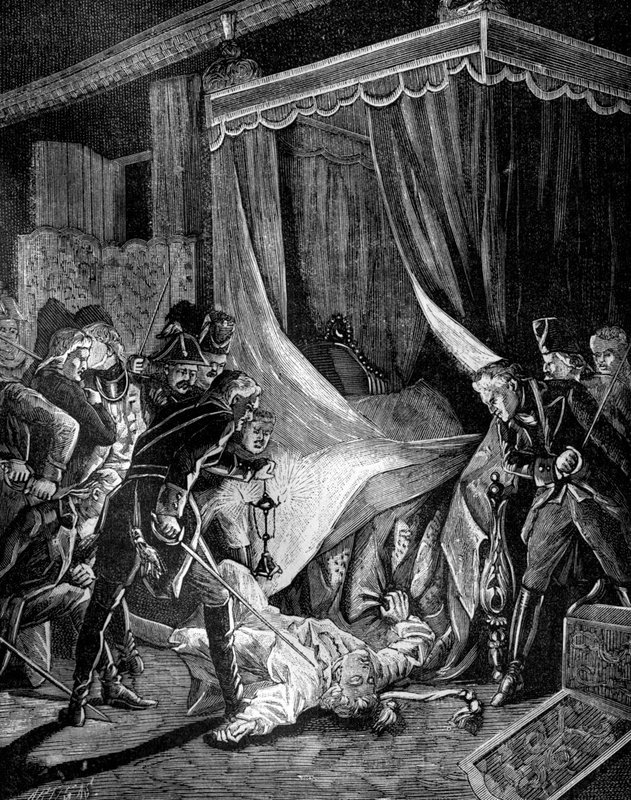
Assassination of Paul I on 23 March 1801, St Michael's Castle, Saint Petersburg, Russian Empire

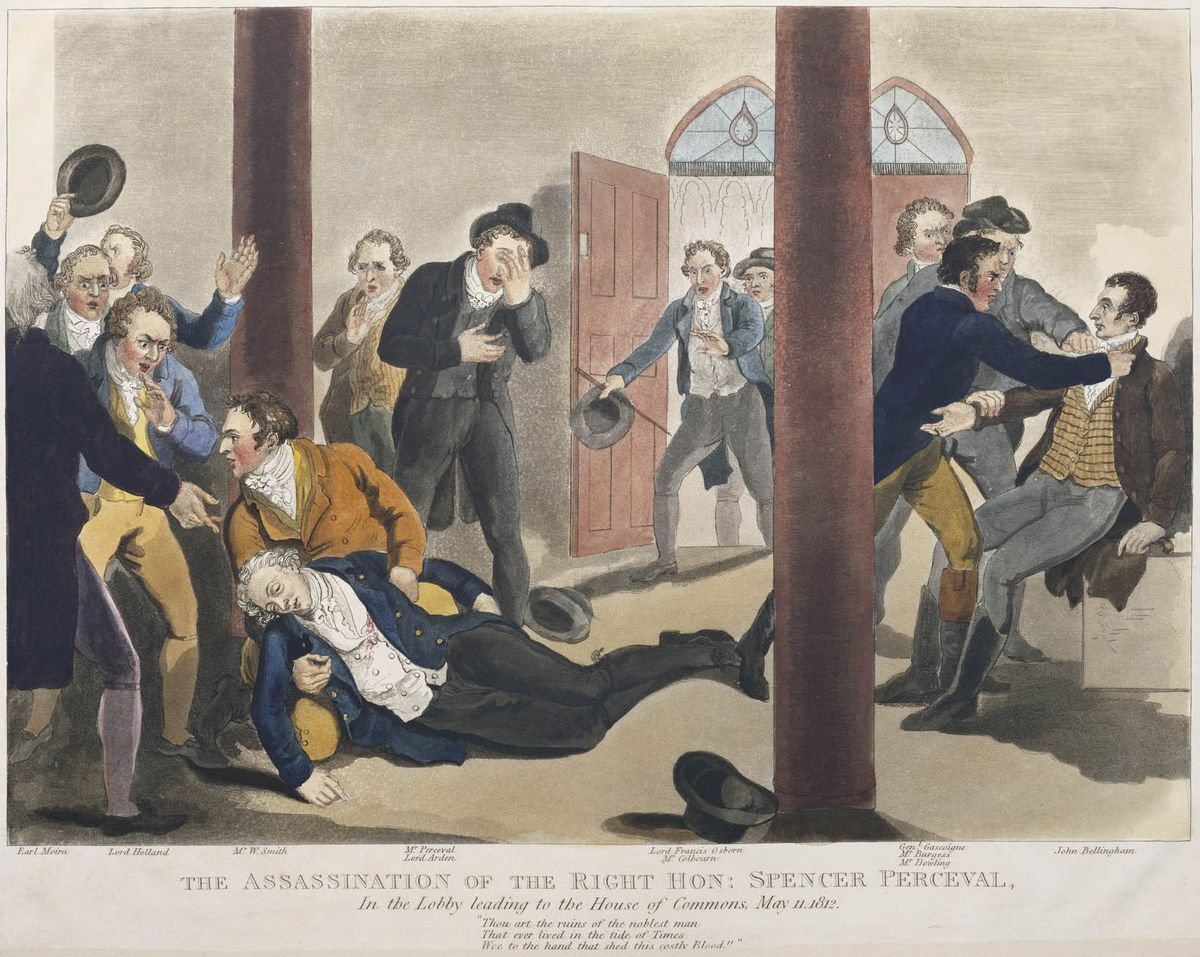
Assassination of Spencer Perceval on May 11, 1812, House of Commons, Westminster, United Kingdom

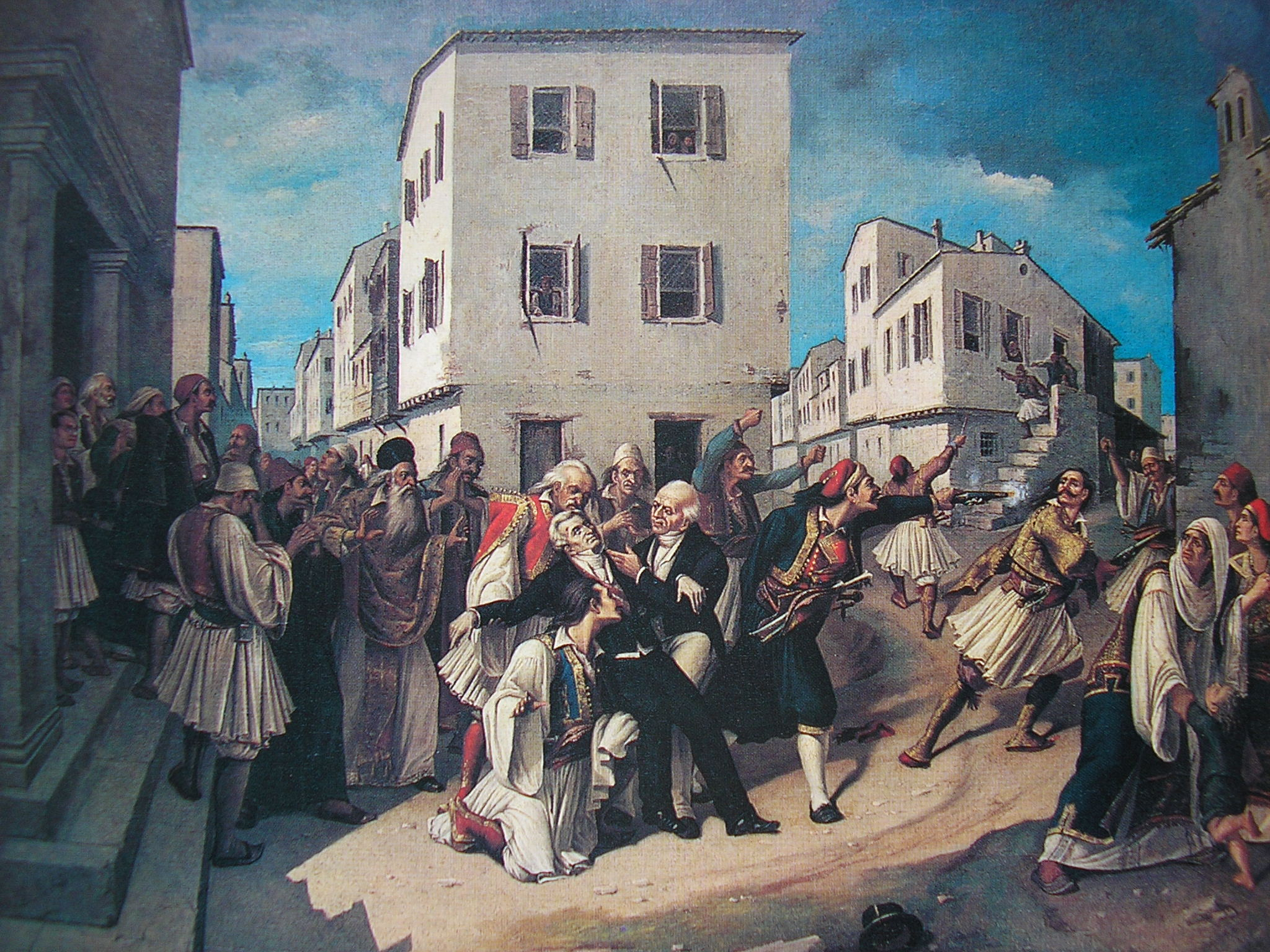
Assassination of Ioannis Kapodistrias on October 9, 1831, Nafplio, Greece

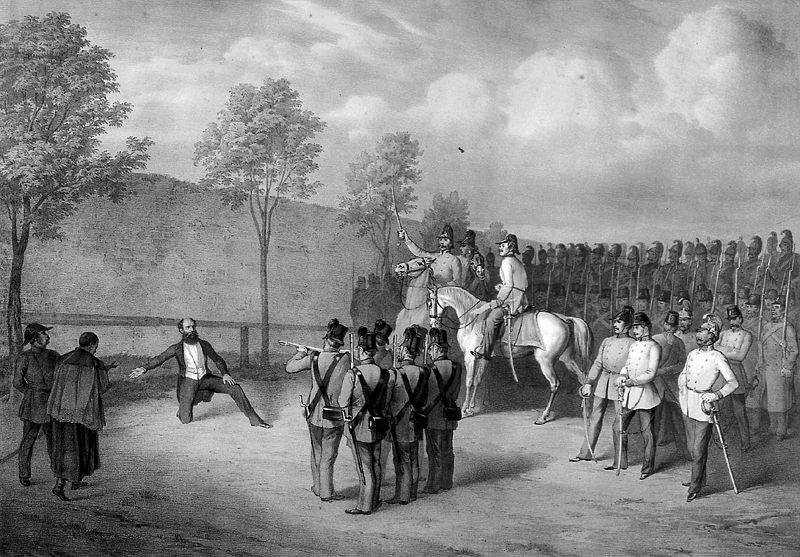
Execution of Lajos Batthyány on October 6, 1849, Pest, Austrian Empire

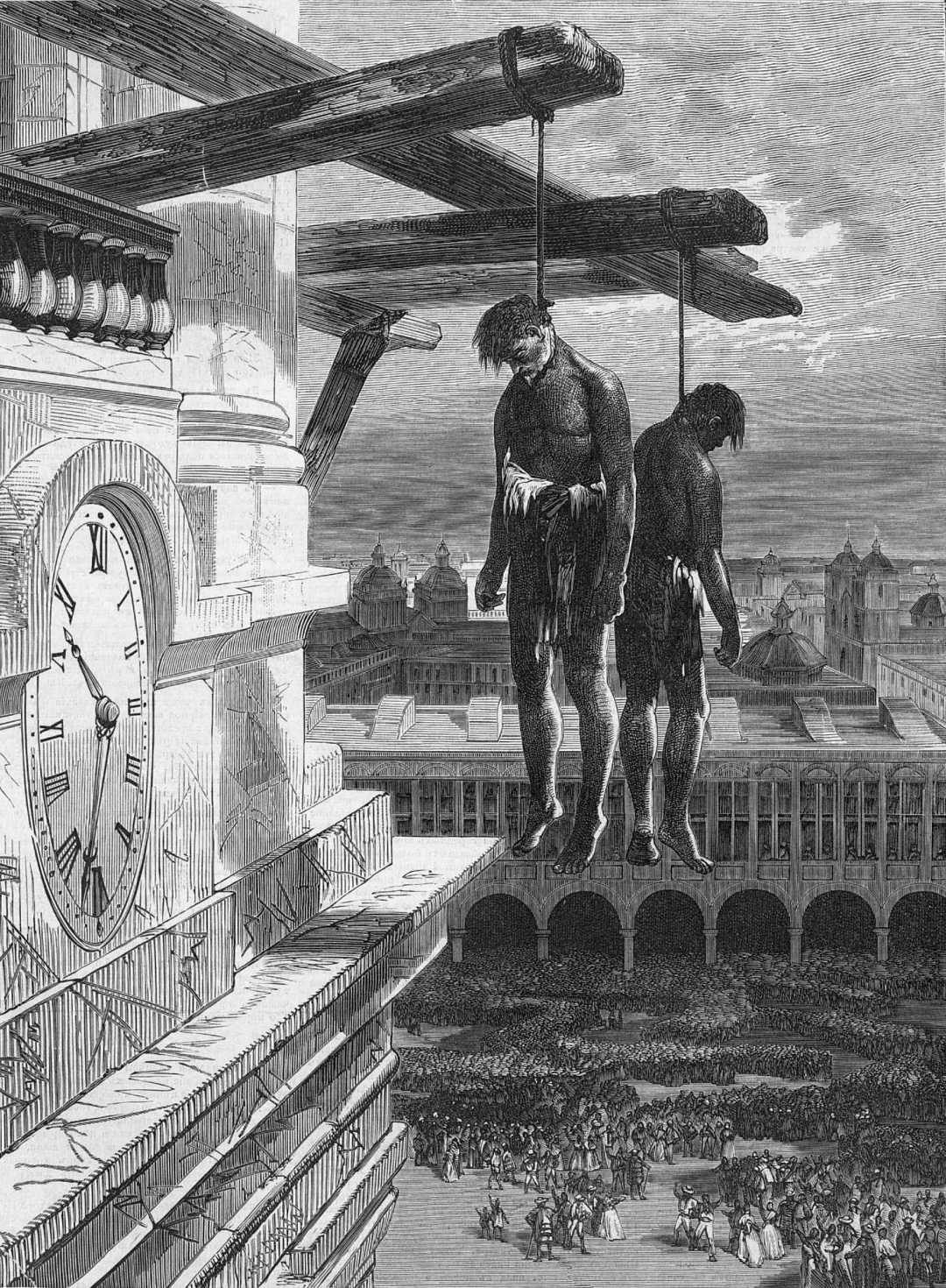
Hanging of Tomás Gutiérrez on July 26, 1872, Lima, Peru

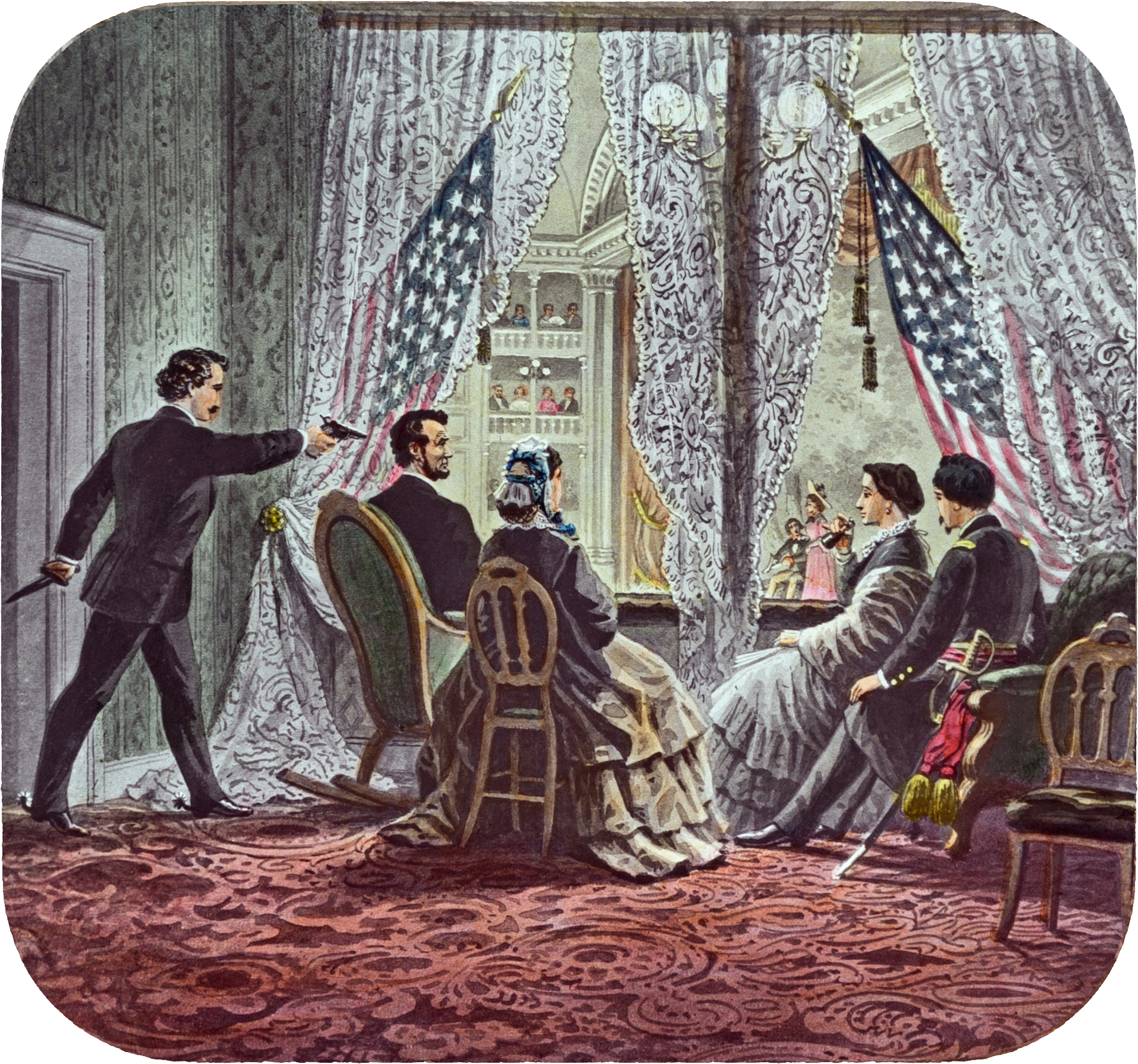
Assassination of Abraham Lincoln on April 14, 1865, Ford's Theatre, Washington, D.C., United States

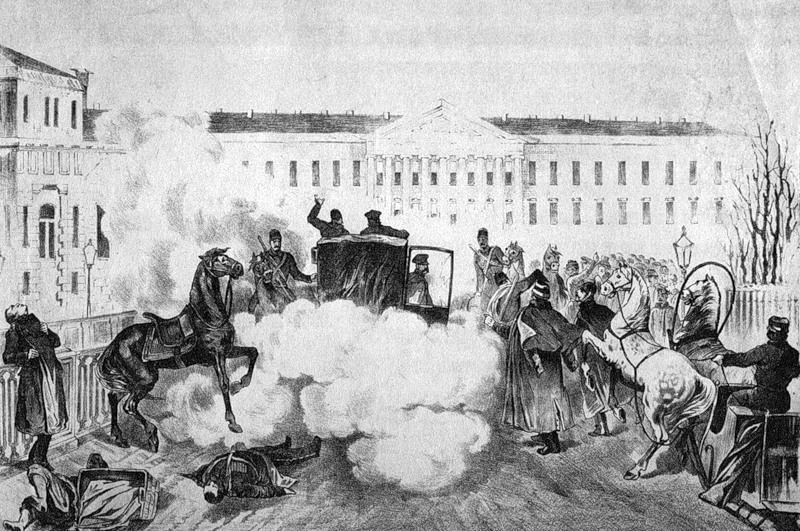
Assassination of Alexander II on March 13, 1881, Saint Petersburg, Russian Empire

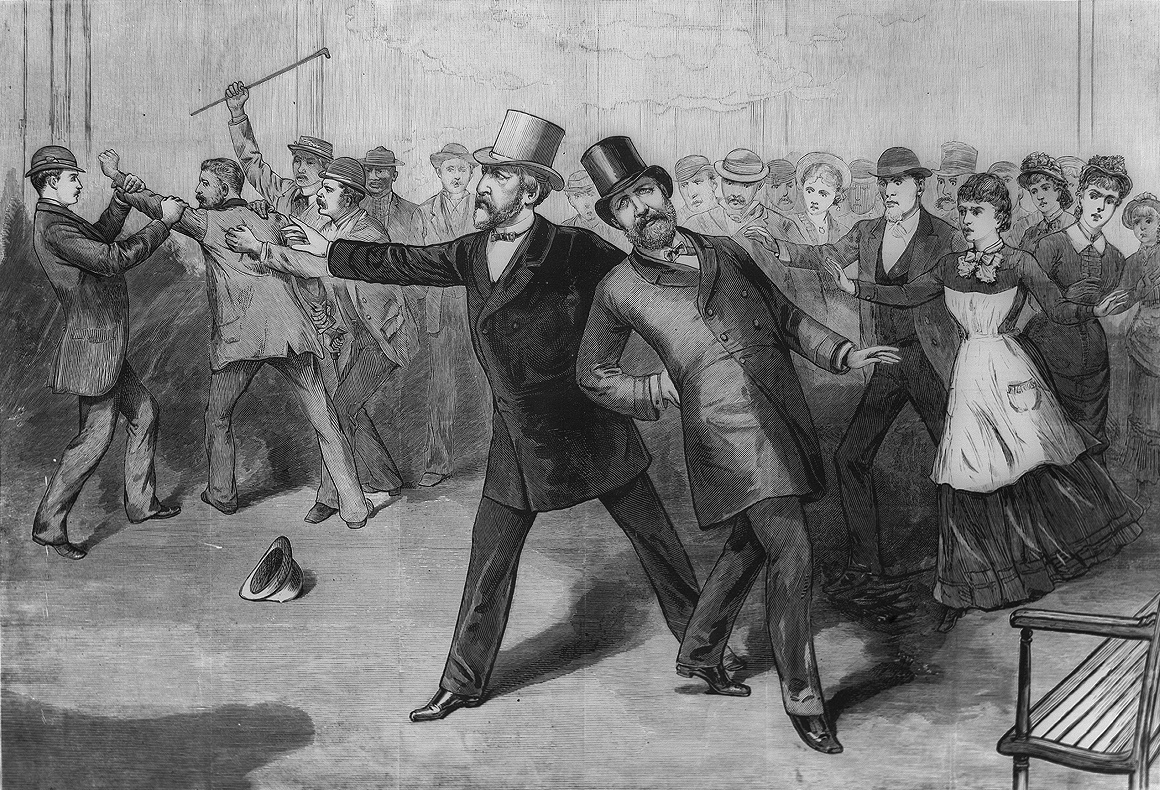
Assassination of James A. Garfield on July 2, 1881, Baltimore and Potomac Railroad Station, Washington, D.C., United States

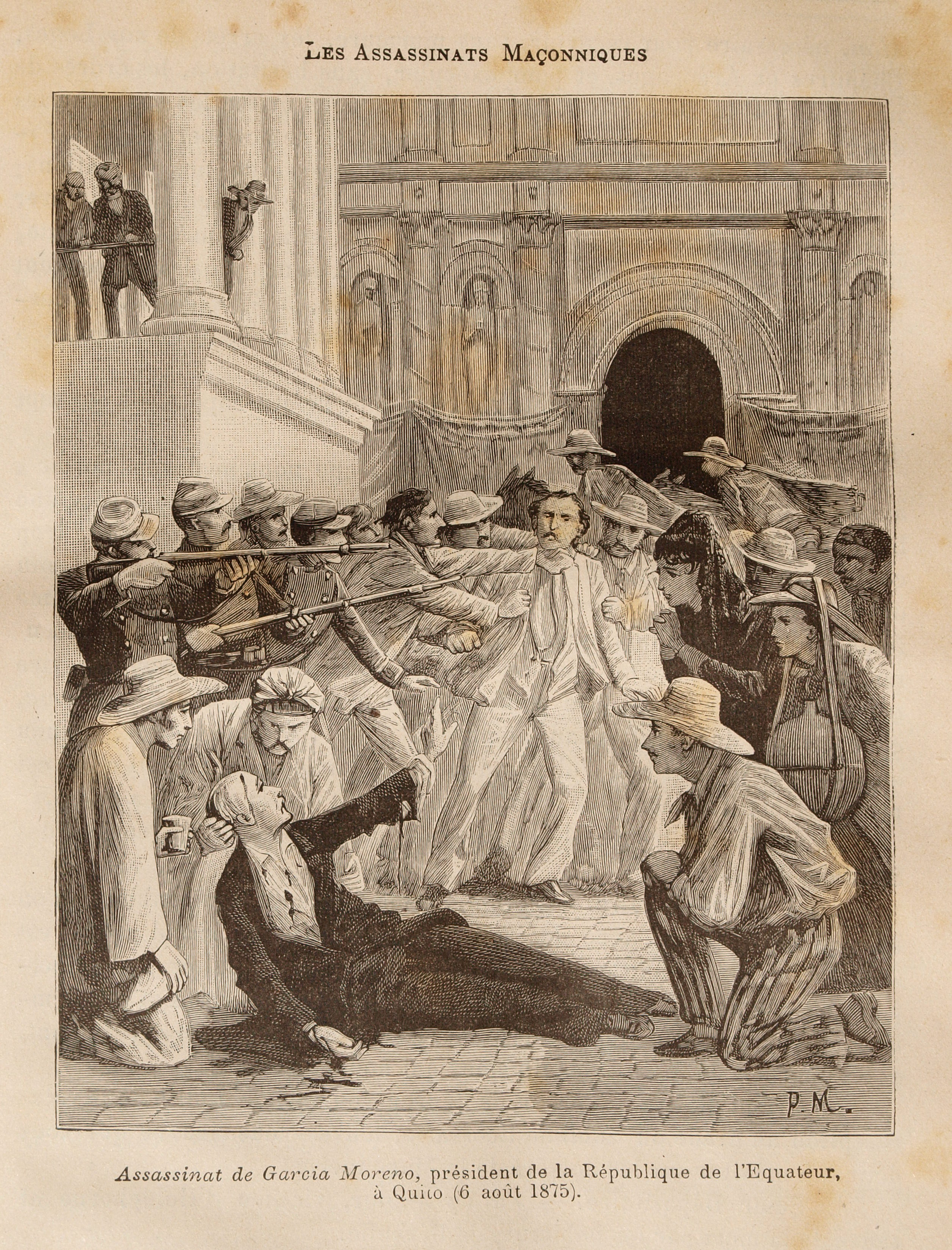
Assassination of Gabriel García Moreno on August 6, 1875, Carondelet Palace, Quito, Ecuador

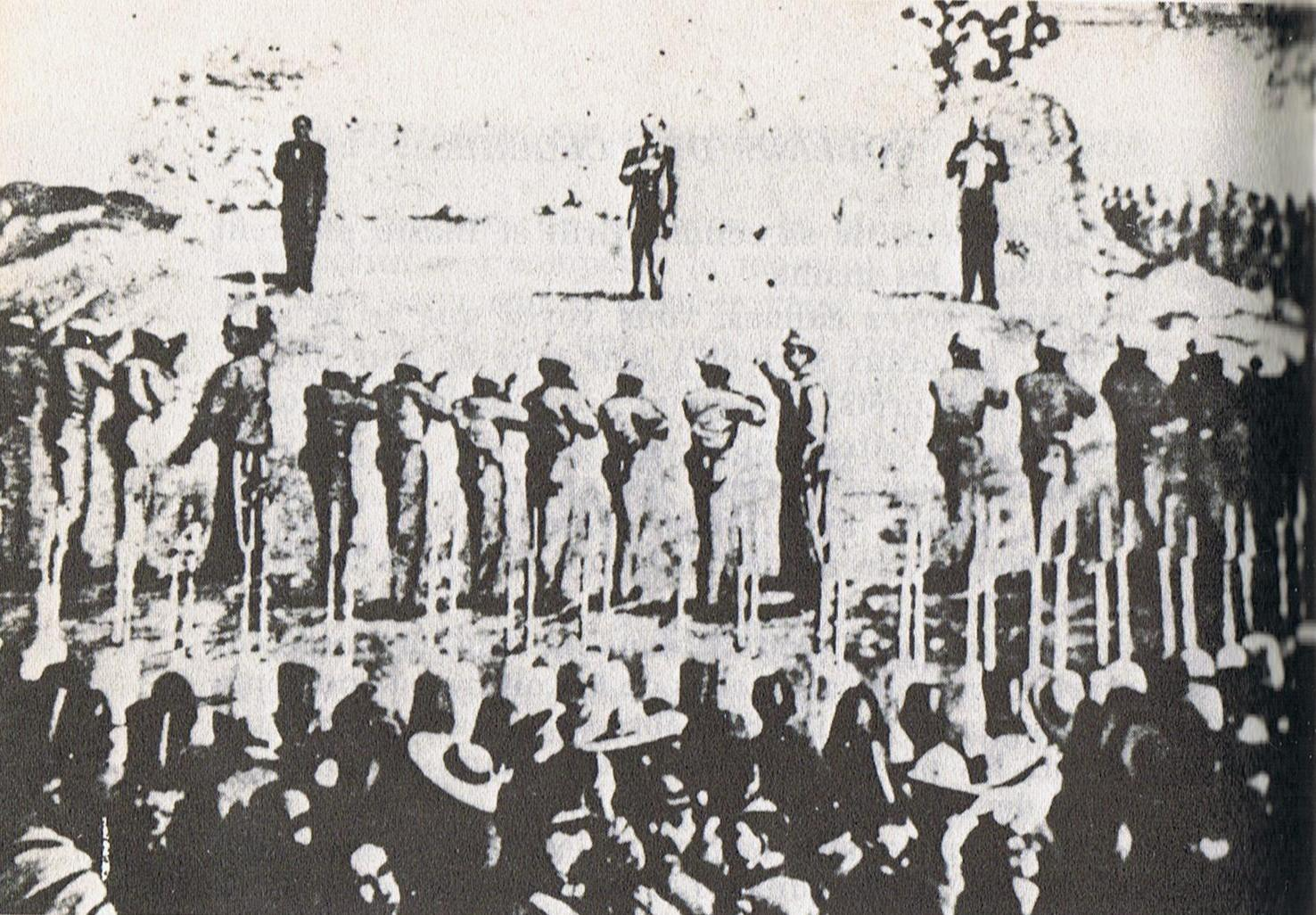
Execution of Maximilian I on June 19, 1867, Santiago de Querétaro, Mexico

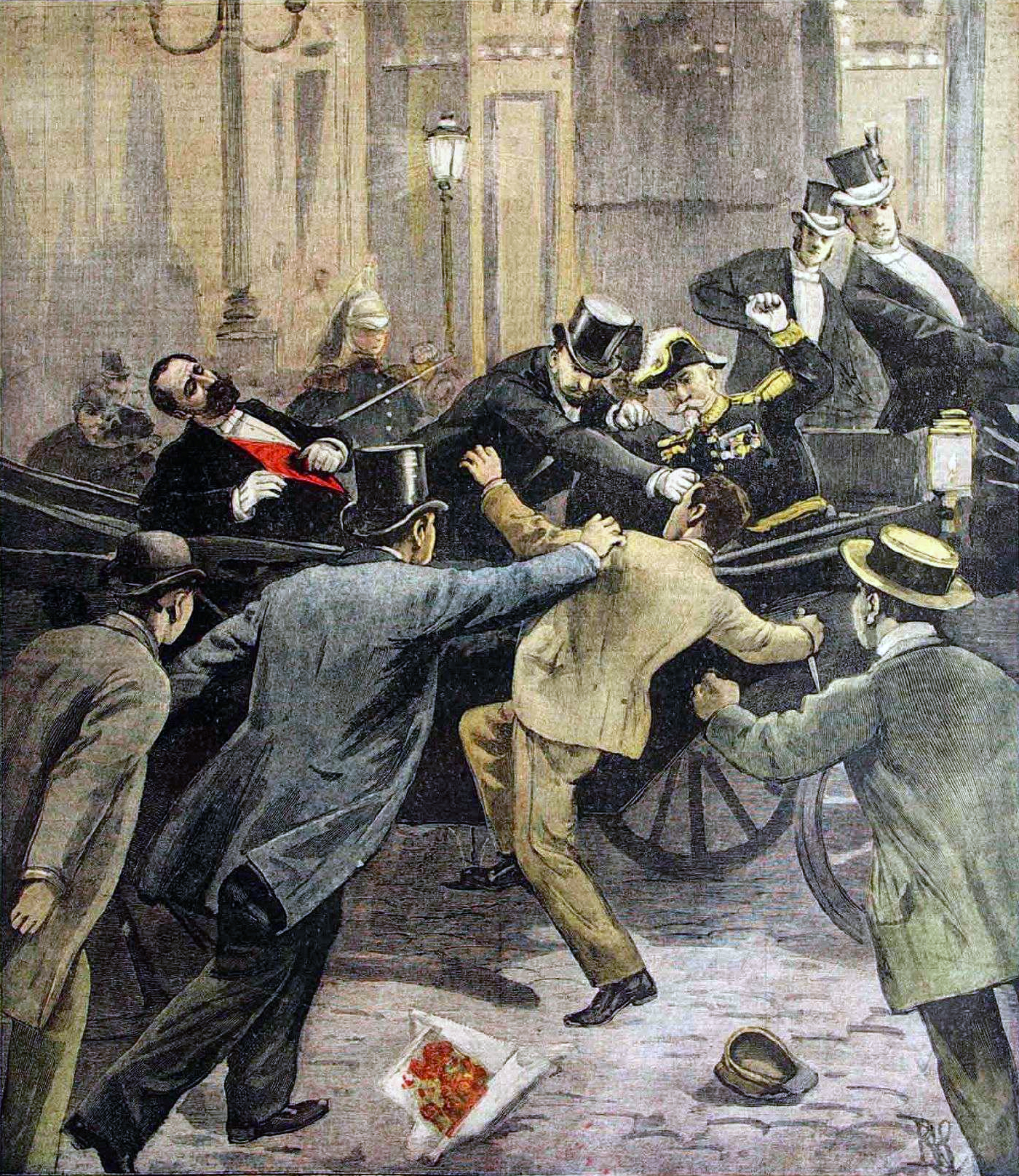
Assassination of Marie François Sadi Carnot on June 25, 1894, Lyon, France

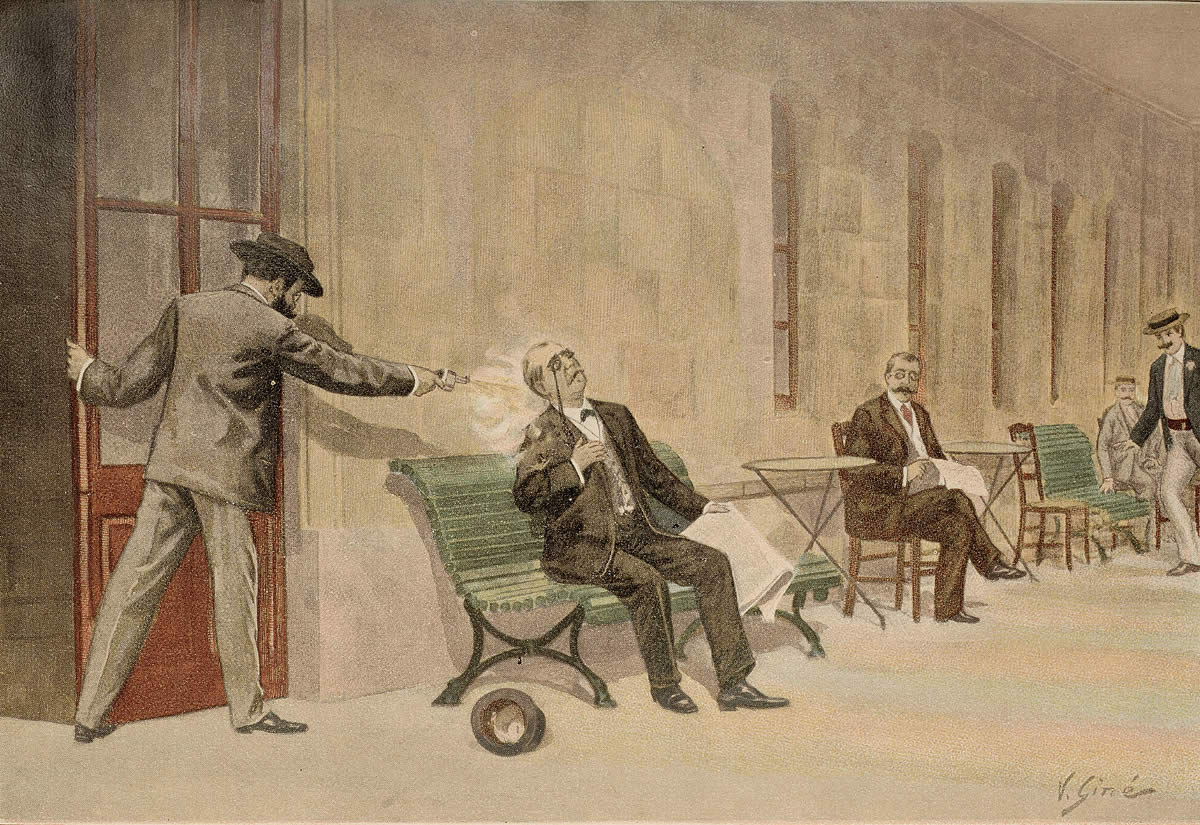
Assassination of Antonio Cánovas del Castillo on August 8, 1897, Mondragón, Spain

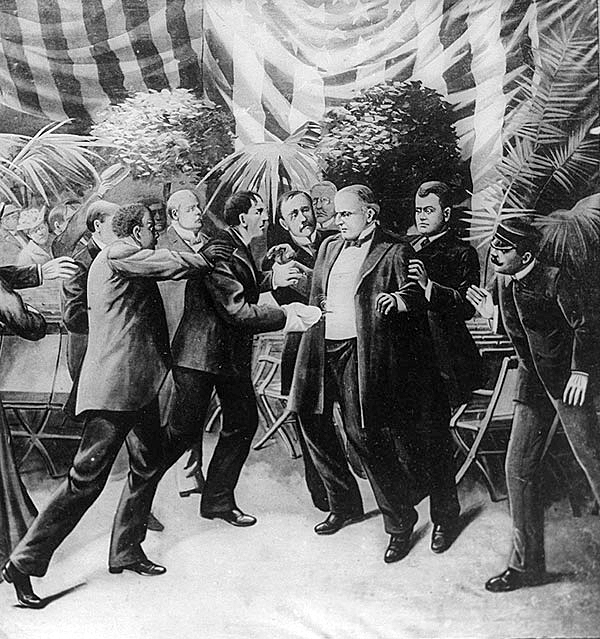
Assassination of Willam McKinley on September 14, 1901, Pan-American Exposition, Buffalo, New York, United States

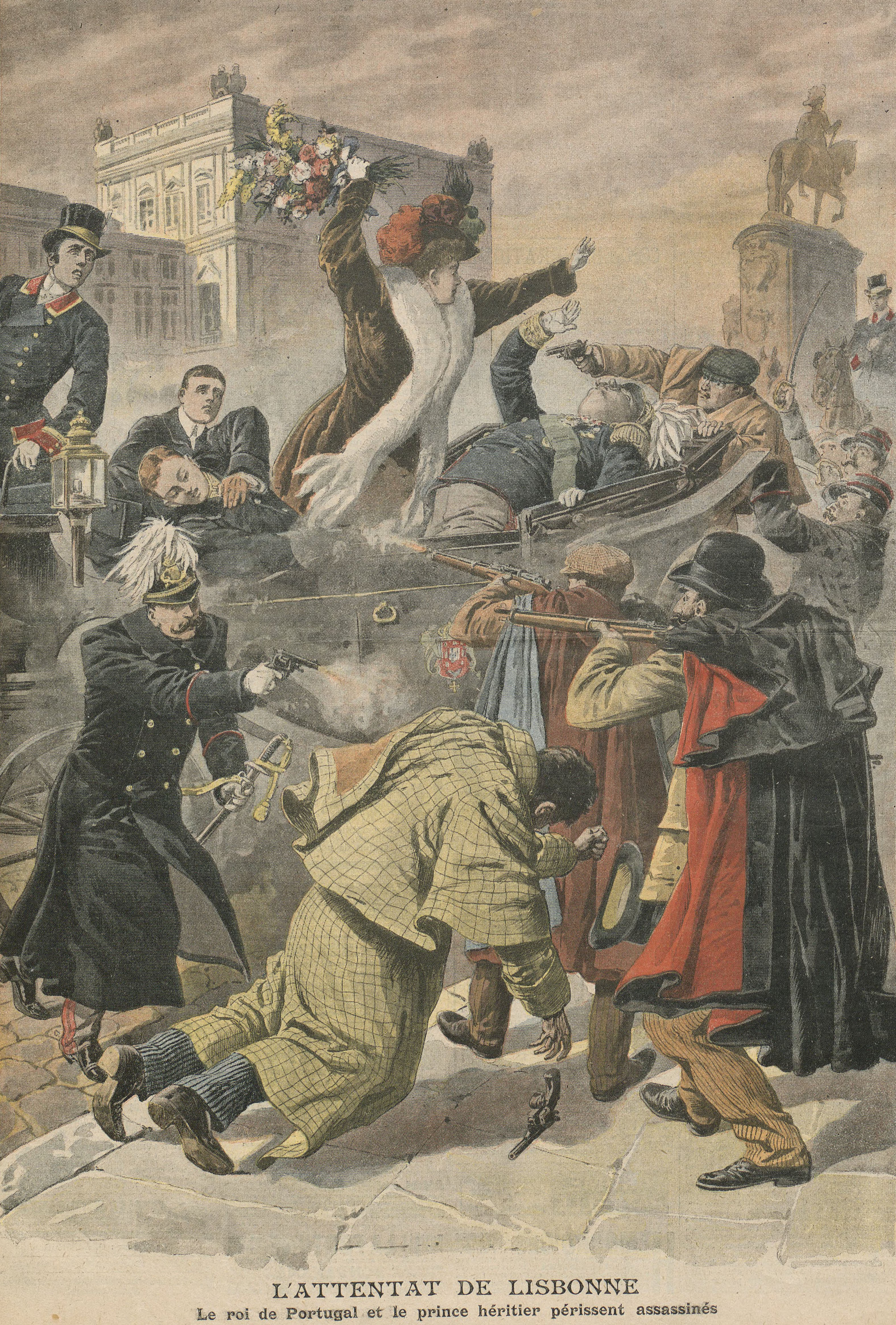
Assassination of Carlos I on February 1, 1908, Terreiro do Paço, Lisbon, Portugal

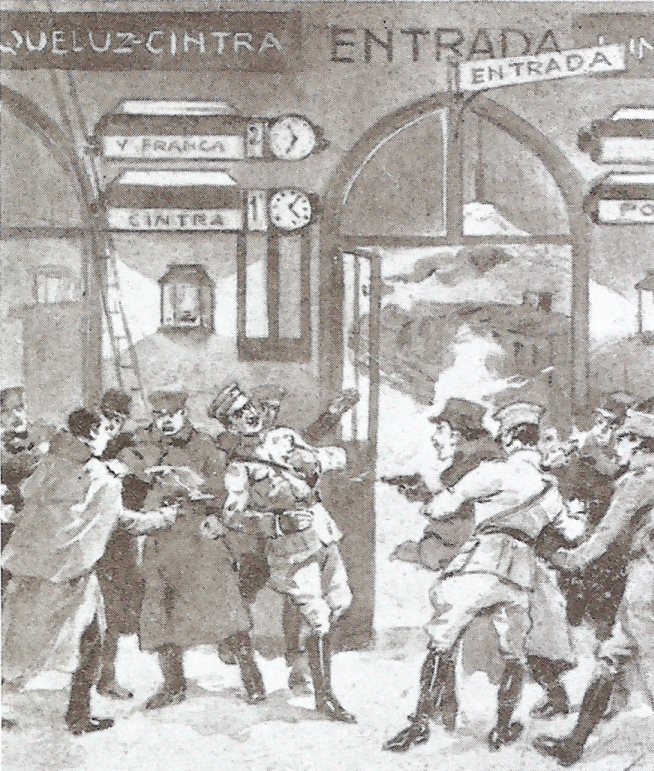
Assassination of Sidónio Pais on December 14, 1918, Rossio railway station, Lisbon, Portugal

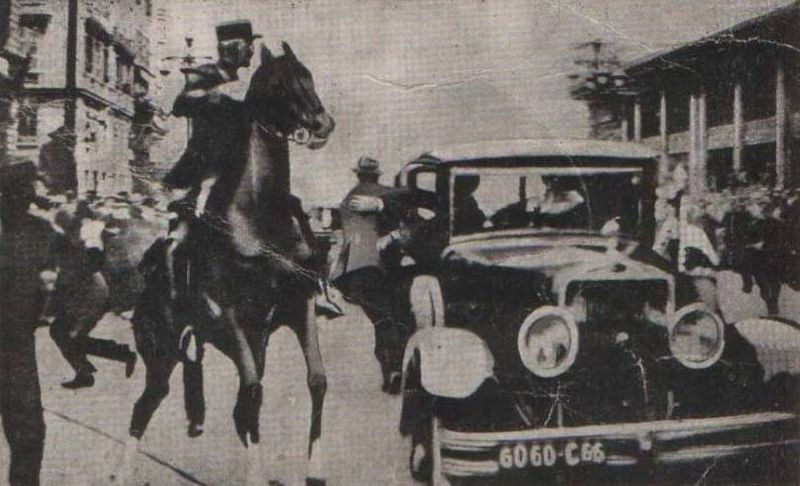
Assassination of Alexander I and Louis Barthou on October 9, 1934, Marseille, France

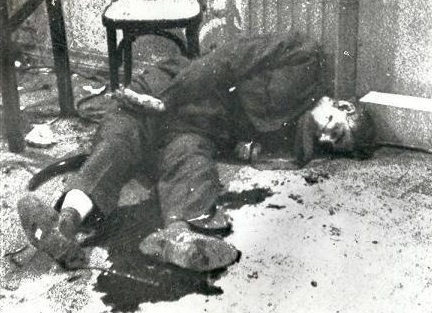
Executed body of Abd al-Karim Qasim on February 9, 1963, Baghdad, Iraq

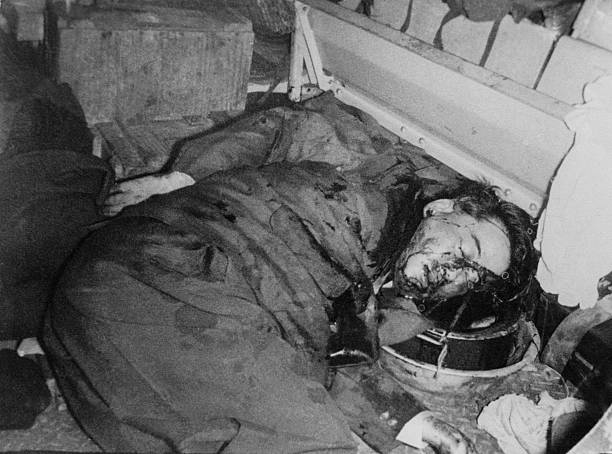
Executed body of Ngô Đình Diệm on November 2, 1963, Saigon, South Vietnam

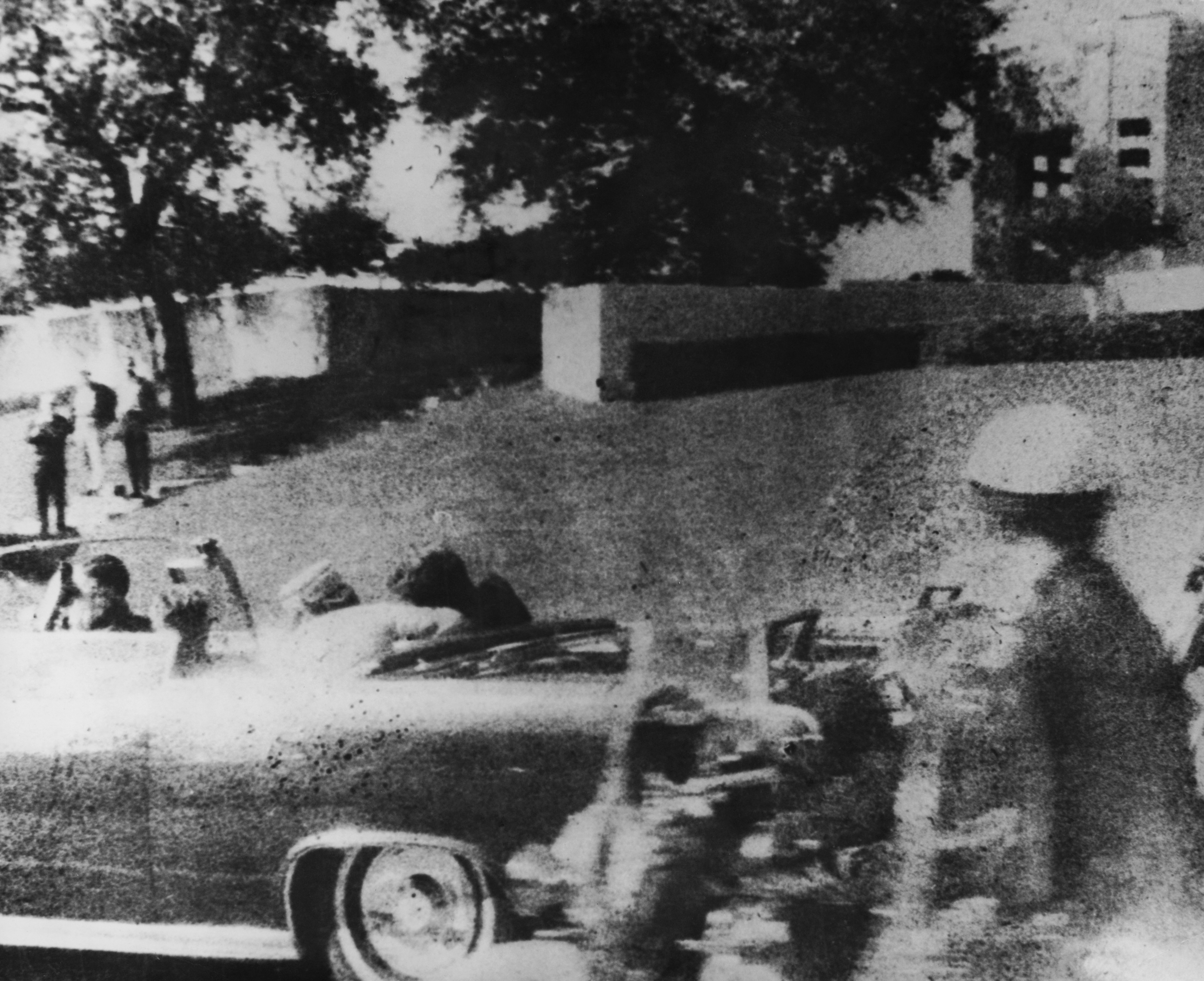
Assassination of John F. Kennedy on November 22, 1963, Dallas, Texas, United States

== See also ==
- List of assassinations
- List of heads of state and government who were sentenced to death
- List of heads of state and government who died by suicide
- List of people who survived assassination attempts
