= Canon of Kings =

List of kings used by ancient astronomers

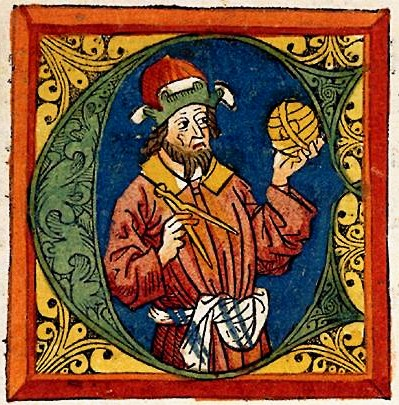

The Canon of Kings was a dated list of kings used by ancient astronomers as a convenient means to date astronomical phenomena, such as eclipses. For a period, the Canon was preserved by the astronomer Claudius Ptolemy, and is thus known sometimes as Ptolemy's Canon. It is one of the most important bases for modern knowledge of ancient chronology.

The Canon derives originally from Babylonian sources. Thus, it lists Kings of Babylon from 747 BC until the conquest of Babylon by Achaemenid Persians in 539 BC, and then Persian kings from 538 to 332 BC. At this point, the Canon was continued by Greek astronomers in Alexandria, and lists the Macedonian kings from 331 to 305 BC, the Ptolemies from 304 BC to 30 BC, and the Roman and Byzantine Emperors, although they are not kings; in some manuscripts the list is continued down to the Fall of Constantinople in 1453.

The Canon only increments by whole years, specifically the ancient Egyptian year of 365 days. This has two consequences. The first is that the dates for when monarchs began and ended their reigns are simplified to the beginning and the ending of the ancient Egyptian year, which moves one day every four years against the Julian calendar. The second is that this list of monarchs is simplified. Monarchs who reigned for less than one year are not listed, and only one monarch is listed in any year with multiple monarchs. Usually, the overlapping year is assigned to the monarch who died in that year, but not always. The two periods in the Babylonian section where no king is listed the first represents two pretenders whose legitimacy the compiler did not recognize, and the second extends from the year Babylon was sacked by Sennacherib, King of Assyria to the restoration of Esarhaddon.

The Canon is generally considered by historians to be accurate, and forms part of the backbone of the commonly accepted chronology from 747 BC forward that all other datings are synchronized to. It is not, however, the ultimate source for this chronology; most of the names and lengths of reigns can be independently verified from archaeological material (coinage, annals, inscriptions in stone etc.) and extant works of history from the historical ages concerned.

== Babylonian Kings, 747–539 BC ==
- Nabonassar (Nabonassáros): 747–734 BC
- Nabu-nadin-zeri (Nadíos): 733–732 BC
- Nabu-mukin-zeri (Khinzêr) and Pulu (Póros): 731–727 BC
- Ululas (Iloulaíos): 726–722 BC
- Marduk-apla-iddina II (Mardokempádos): 721–710 BC
- Sargon II (Arkeanós): 709–705 BC
- no kings: 704–703 BC
- Bel-ibni (Bilíbos): 702–700 BC
- Ashur-nadin-shumi (Aparanadíos): 699–694 BC
- Nergal-ushezib (Rhegebélos): 693 BC
- Mushezib-Marduk (Mesêsimordákos): 692–689 BC
- no kings: 688–681 BC
- Esarhaddon (Asaradínos): 680–668 BC
- Shamash-shum-ukin (Saosdoukhínos): 667–648 BC
- Kandalanu (Kinêladános): 647–626 BC
- Nabopolassar (Nabopolassáros): 625–605 BC
- Nebuchadrezzar II (Nabokolassáros): 604–562 BC
- Amel-Marduk (Illoaroudámos): 561–560 BC
- Neriglissar (Nêrigasolassáros): 559–556 BC
- Nabonidus (Nabonadíos): 555–539 BC

== Persian Kings, 538–332 BC ==
- Cyrus: 538–530 BC
- Cambyses: 529–522 BC
- Darius I: 521–486 BC
- Xerxes I: 485–465 BC
- Artaxerxes I (Longimanus): 464–424 BC
- Darius II: 423–405 BC
- Artaxerxes II (Mnemon): 404–359 BC
- Artaxerxes III (Ochus): 358–338 BC
- Arses (Arogus): 337–336 BC
- Darius III: 335–332 BC

== Macedonian Kings, 331–305 BC ==
- Alexander the Great: 331–324 BC
- Philip III: 323–317 BC
- Alexander IV: (Note: A modern misreading here of ΑΛΕΞΑΝΔΡΟΥ ΑΙΓΟΥ, of Alexander Aegus, for ΑΛΕΞΑΝΔΡΟΥ ΑΛΛΟΥ, of the other Alexander, has caused Alexander IV to be sometimes erroneously called Aegus. See e.g. Bevan, Edwyn Robert (1911). "Alexander III." . In Chisholm, Hugh (ed.). Encyclopædia Britannica. Vol. 01 (11th ed.). Cambridge University Press. pp. 545–552, see page 549.) 316–305 BC

== Ptolemies of Egypt, 304–30 BC ==
- Ptolemy I Soter (Ptolemy, son of Lagus): 304–285 BC
- Ptolemy II Philadelphus: 284–247 BC
- Ptolemy III Euergetes: 246–222 BC
- Ptolemy IV Philopator: 221–205 BC
- Ptolemy V Epiphanes: 204–181 BC
- Ptolemy VI Philometor: 180–146 BC
- Ptolemy VIII Euergetes II: 145–117 BC
- Ptolemy IX Soter II: 116–81 BC
- Ptolemy XII Neos Dionysus: 80–52 BC
- Cleopatra Thea Philopator: 51–30 BC

== Roman Emperors, 29 BC–160 AD ==
- Augustus: 29 BC–14 AD
- Tiberius: 15–36
- Gaius: 37–40
- Claudius: 41–54
- Nero: 55–68
- Vespasian: 69–78
- Titus: 79–81
- Domitian: 82–96
- Nerva: 97
- Trajan: 98–116
- Hadrian: 117–137
- Aelius Antoninus: 138–160

== Notes and sources ==
Notes

Sources

- Reprint of the Canon in Ginzel, Friedrich Karl (1906). Handbuch der Mathematischen und Technischen Chronologie (in Greek and German). Vol. 1. Leipzig: J.C. Hinrichs. p. 139. At the Internet Archive.

== See also ==
- List of lists of ancient kings
- Mesopotamia in Classical literature
- Chronology of the ancient Near East
