= Bit-Amukkani =

Ancient Chaldean tribe

Bit-Amukkani among the Chaldean states in Babylonia during the 1st millennium BCE.

Bit-Amukani (in the Aramaic Assur Ostracon ʾwkn; Assyrian ^{m}A-muk-ka-nu; Babylonian ^{di}Bit U-ka-a-ni, ^{di}U-ka-nu; lit. House of Amukani) was a tribe, proto-state founded by Chaldeans in southern Mesopotamia which stretched from southeast of Nippur to the area of Uruk. It is considered to have been one of the most powerful Chaldean tribes, next to Bīt-Iakin and Bīt-Dakkūri.

As early as 732 BCE, it was ruled by prince Ukinzer (also known as Mukin-zeri or Nabu-mukin-zeri) who became a king of Babylon in 732 BCE instead of Nabu-shum-ukin II whom he superseded. Later, Tiglath-pileser III devastated Bit-Amukani for the second time and defeated Mukin-zeri. Shalmaneser III (856-824) inscriptions note that two Chaldean leaders (Mušallim-Marduk of Bīt-Amukāni and Adīnu of Bīt-Dakkūri) carried silver, gold, tin, bronze, elephant tusks, elephant skins, ebony and sissoowood (or meskannu wood) as a tribute to the King of Assyria.

Though unconfirmed, the economy of Bīt-Amūkāni probably relied on producing dates.

Tiglath-pileser III described his genocide of Bit-Amukani with the words: "the land Bit-Amukani I threshed as with a threshing instrument. I took all of its people (and) its property to Assyria." Although Tiglath-pileser III's writings testify to conflict with Bīt-Amūkāni, Bīt-Amūkāni never went extinct but actually remained important through later Babylonian history.

Sennacherib's inscriptions note that Bit-Amukani consisted of 39 walled cities and 350 villages. Its capital was Sapia (Assyrian Sapīya or Šapīya).

== List of Bīt-Amūkāni leaders ==
Name	Reign	Comments
Mušallim-Marduk	somewhere during Shalmaneser III	gave tribute to Shalmaneser III in 850
(Nabû-)mukīn-zēri, king	731–729	deposed by Tiglath-pileser III; besieged in Šapīya, but not captured father of Šuma-ukīn
Ea-zēra-(i)qīša	673 > time of Ashurbanipal	held hostage in Assyria during rebellion of 652–648; his mother was Humbušte (or Humbuštu); assured loyalty of Bit Amukani to Ashurbanipal
? Kudurru	ca. rebellion of 652–648?	position in tribe uncertain, according to Lipinski governor of Uruk; probably was not Bit-Amukanean, but rather installed by Ashurbanipal
