= Nabu-suma-ukin II =

Nabû-šuma-ukîn II
- King of Babylon
- Reign: 732 BC
- Predecessor: Nabû-nādin-zēri
- Successor: Nabû-mukin-zēri
- House: Dynasty of E

Nabû-šuma-ukîn II, inscribed ^{m}[^{d}]Nabû-šuma-úkîn (Note: Kinglist A, BM 33332, iv 5.) or ^{m}Šuma-[úkîn], (Note: Chronicle on the Reigns from Nabû-Nasir to Šamaš-šuma-ukin (ABC 1), i 16–18.) whose complete name (meaning "Nabû has established legitimate progeny") is only known from the Kinglist A, was a usurper and briefly king of Babylon for one month and two days during 732 BC before he was swept aside by his successor, Nabû-mukin-zēri.

== Biography ==
His reign was so fleeting he was omitted from the Ptolemaic Canon. His Assyrian contemporary was Tukultī-apil-Ešarra III who was too distracted campaigning in Syria to react to political events. He came to power as a disaffected former provincial governor leading a rebellion against Nabû-nādin-zēri, the son and successor of Nabû-Nasir.

He was deposed and replaced by the Chaldean chief, Nabû-mukin-zēri, of the Bīt-Amukani tribe, within weeks establishing a trend as later pretenders from the traditional Babylonian population were likewise to be displaced quickly by Chaldeans, Marduk-zakir-šumi II by Marduk-apla-iddina II in 703 BC and Nergal-ušezib by Mušezib-Marduk in 692 BC.
