= Nabu-nadin-zeri =

Nabû-nādin-zēri
- King of Babylon
- Reign: 733 – 732 BC
- Predecessor: Nabû-Nasir
- Successor: Nabû-šuma-ukīn II
- House: Dynasty of E (mixed dynasties)

Nabû-nādin-zēri, inscribed ^{m}[^{d}Na]bû-nādìn-zēri in the King List A, (Note: Kinglist A, BM 33332 iv.) the only place his full name is given, and Na-di-nu or Na-din in the Chronicle on the Reigns from Nabû-Nasir to Šamaš-šuma-ukin known as Chronicle 1, (Note: Chronicle 1, I 13–15.) was the king of Babylon (733–732 BC), son and successor of Nabû-Nasir (747–734 BC). The Ptolemaic Canon gives his name as Νάδιος or Νάβιος, similar to the Chronicle version of his name.

== Biography ==
His accession followed shortly after the first incursions of the newly emboldened Neo-Assyrian state. He was one of the kings who were contemporary with Tukultī-apil-Ešarra III, the Assyrian king who would later (729 BC) go on to conquer Babylon. In the second year of his reign, he was toppled and killed (dīk) in an insurrection led by a provincial official (bēl pīḫati) named Nabû-šuma-ukīn, who in turn was to retain the throne for little more than one month. There are no known texts from his reign. The overthrow of his dynasty and its replacement by a usurper may have provided Tukultī-apil-Ešarra with the excuse to invade.
